= Isabelle de Steiger =

English painter

- Born: Isabelle Lace; 28 February 1836; Liverpool, England
- Died: 1 January 1927 (aged 90); Rock Ferry, Wirral, England
- Known for: Painting, Theosophy and writing
- Spouse: Rudolf Adolf von Steiger von Riggesberg (m. 1861–1870)

Isabelle de Steiger, née Lace (28 February 1836 – 1 January 1927), was an English painter, theosophist, occultist and writer. She became a member of several esoteric societies in London, and was a close friend and co-worker of Anna Kingsford.

== Biography ==
Isabelle Lace was born in Liverpool, the daughter (and one of seven children) of Joshua Lace, a solicitor. She was educated first in Liverpool, then in Stratford-upon-Avon. In 1861, she married a Swiss cotton merchant, Rudolf Adolf von Steiger von Riggesberg. The couple divided their time between England and Switzerland, then settled down, for professional reasons, in Egypt, where her husband died of Tuberculosis in 1870.

Isabelle de Steiger returned to England in 1874 and studied art, first at the Heatherley School of Fine Art, then at the Slade School of Fine Art in London. Having obtained her degree, she began a career as a professional painter, going on to exhibit at various galleries, such as the Royal Academy in London, and the Walker Art Gallery in Liverpool. Her style was strongly influenced by Lawrence Alma-Tadema and his historical paintings, such as Cleopatra after the Battle of Actium etc. She was also known for her flower painting and book illustrations. She illustrated, for example, the occult magazine The Unknown World (1894-1895), edited by A. E. Waite. She painted some figures in the Theosphical movement but unfortunately much of her work was destroyed in a fire. She also experienced the prevailing prejudice against women which made it difficult to rent studio space and attend life classes, as well as social obstacles to women having an independent career.

In the early 1870s, Steiger was drawn towards spiritualism and in 1878 joined the Theosophical Society. She came into contact with Madame Blavatsky, Mabel Collins and Anna Kingsford, the latter being especially esteemed by Steiger and becoming a close friend. Later, after a split within the Theosophical society, she became a member of the Hermetic Society, founded by Kingsford; she was also a member of the Society for Psychical Research.

Steiger became a friend of the alchemist Mary Anne Atwood, and her own writings were also strongly influenced by Alchemy; on Atwood's death, in 1910, she successfully republished Atwood's principal work, A Suggestive Inquiry into the Hermetic Mystery. She joined the Hermetic Order of the Golden Dawn in 1888, and, after a factional split of the society in 1903, left with A. E. Waite, joining his "Holy Order of the Golden Dawn", despite their disagreements on the subject of Alchemy. She also founded, in 1912, an Alchemical Society. Towards the end of her life she followed the teachings of Anthroposophy.

Steiger wrote several books on mystical subjects, including a translation of Karl von Eckartshausen's "The Cloud upon the Sanctuary", and an autobiography. She also wrote articles which appeared in various journals. She died in Rock Ferry, Cheshire in January 1927.

== Bibliography ==
Books by Steiger:

- On a Gold Basis: A Treatise on Mysticism , (London: Philip Wellby. 1907).
- Superhumanity, 1916.
- Memorabilia: reminiscences of a woman artist and writer (London : Rider & Co., 1927).

Translated or edited by Steiger:

- Karl von Eckartshausen, The Cloud upon the Sanctuary , 1896. (Réédition par Hays Ltd, 2003.
- Mary Anne Atwood, A Suggestive Inquiry into the Hermetic Mystery: With a Dissertation on the More Celebrated of the Alchemical Philosophers Being an Attempt Towards the Recovery of the Ancient Experiment of Nature 1910. (New edition by Kessinger Publishing, 1999).

== See also ==
English women painters from the early 19th century who exhibited at the Royal Academy of Art

- Sophie Gengembre Anderson
- Mary Baker
- Ann Charlotte Bartholomew
- Maria Bell
- Barbara Bodichon
- Joanna Mary Boyce
- Margaret Sarah Carpenter
- Fanny Corbaux
- Rosa Corder
- Mary Ellen Edwards
- Harriet Gouldsmith
- Mary Harrison (artist)
- Jane Benham Hay
- Anna Mary Howitt
- Mary Moser
- Martha Darley Mutrie
- Ann Mary Newton
- Emily Mary Osborn
- Kate Perugini
- Louise Rayner
- Ellen Sharples
- Rolinda Sharples
- Rebecca Solomon
- Elizabeth Emma Soyer
- Henrietta Ward
