= Mary Harrison (artist) =

English painter (1788–1875)

Mary Harrison (1788 – 25 November 1875) was an English flower and fruit painter, and illustrator. She became popularly called the "Rose and Primrose painter". She has also been known as Mary P. Harrison and Mary Rossiter Harrison.

== Life and work ==
She was born Mary P. Rossiter, in Liverpool, the daughter of William Rossiter, a prosperous hat manufacturer of Stockport and Liverpool. She was a talented amateur artist from an early age though, from all accounts, she received little encouragement from her parents, even having to improvise paint-brushes from locks of her own hair, and make up pigments from household products; She practiced her art by copying from art prints. She also had to look after her invalid mother and sister, which left little time for painting.

In 1814 she married William Harrison and visited France on honeymoon. While in Paris she was given permission to copy pictures in the Louvre - the first English woman to have been granted this privilege. Her eldest son was born at Amiens, a few months before the Battle of Waterloo and she had to return home in haste in 1815.

Settling again in Liverpool her husband, who had up to then been comfortably off, became a partner in a brewery, in which he lost much of his fortune in 1830. His health also failed around the same time, and Mary had to deploy her artistic talents in order to support her family. She became a popular art teacher in Liverpool, Chester, and the surrounding district. In 1829 she came to London, and on the foundation in 1831 of the New Society of Painters in Watercolours she became one of the original members. As well as exhibiting at the Watercolour society gallery in London for over 40 years, she also showed her work at the Royal Academy, British Institution and the Society of British Artists.

Her art, though of limited scope, was of a very delicate and refined nature. Her fruit and flower pieces bore unmistakable marks of taste, feeling, and close observation of nature. Her first works, in the 1810s, were of detached specimens of fruit, cut sprigs of garden or wild flowers, and sometimes birds' nests. As she progressed, she painted living, growing plants, especially wild flowers, depicting violets, cowslips, wood anemones, primroses, snowdrops, crocuses and the most beautiful roses, in her annual supply of work to art exhibitions. She exhibited over 50 pictures in total.

Harrison's work became much sought after and she was known as the 'Rose and Primrose painter'. During her lifetime two of her works were purchased by Queen Victoria. Probably her best known work is "The History of a Primrose" (1862) executed in three panels representing 'Infancy, maturity, Decay'. She also provided some illustrations for Curtis's Botanical Magazine.

Mary worked up to the final day of her life, dying in Hampstead, London on 25 Nov. 1875, aged 88.

Of her children, George Henry Harrison (1816–1846) was a professional landscape painter; the eldest son, William Frederick Harrison (1815–1880) was a good amateur painter who exhibited at the Royal Academy and other galleries. Two of her daughters, Maria (fl. 1845-93) and Harriet also became painters.

== See also ==
English women painters from the early 19th century who exhibited at the Royal Academy of Art

- Sophie Gengembre Anderson
- Mary Baker
- Ann Charlotte Bartholomew
- Maria Bell
- Barbara Bodichon
- Joanna Mary Boyce
- Margaret Sarah Carpenter
- Fanny Corbaux
- Rosa Corder
- Mary Ellen Edwards
- Harriet Gouldsmith
- Jane Benham Hay
- Anna Mary Howitt
- Mary Moser
- Martha Darley Mutrie
- Ann Mary Newton
- Emily Mary Osborn
- Kate Perugini
- Louise Rayner
- Ellen Sharples
- Rolinda Sharples
- Rebecca Solomon
- Elizabeth Emma Soyer
- Isabelle de Steiger
- Henrietta Ward
