= Harriet Gouldsmith =

English landscape painter and etcher

Harriet Gouldsmith Arnold
- Born: Harriet Gouldsmith; 1787
- Died: 6 January 1863 (aged 75–76)
- Known for: Painting
- Spouse: Captain Arnold (m. 1839)

Harriet Gouldsmith (1787 – 6 January 1863) was an English landscape painter and etcher.

== Biography ==
Gouldsmith was a pupil of William Mulready, with whom she has been romantically linked, and through him met John Linnell, who was an influence on her work. She painted in both oils and watercolour, first exhibiting her work in 1807 at the Academy and continuing to show there until 1859 (contributing Landscape with Woodcutters' Cottages in Kent). She also exhibited at the Water Colour Society (up to 1820), of which she was elected a member in 1813, the British Institution and, occasionally, the Suffolk Street Gallery.

Apart from landscapes, she also painted a few portraits and one subject picture on the theme of "Don Quixote". In 1819, she published four landscape etchings of Claremont, and in 1824, four landscape lithographs. She was said to be an expert etcher and "drew on stone for lithographer Hullmandel".

In 1839, she married Captain Arnold, R.N., and from then on exhibited under her married name. In that year she published, anonymously, a book illustrated with her work, A Voice from a Picture.

Harriet Arnold died on 6 January 1863, aged 76.

== See also ==
English women painters from the early 19th century who exhibited at the Royal Academy of Art

- Sophie Gengembre Anderson
- Mary Baker
- Ann Charlotte Bartholomew
- Maria Bell
- Barbara Bodichon
- Joanna Mary Boyce
- Margaret Sarah Carpenter
- Fanny Corbaux
- Rosa Corder
- Mary Ellen Edwards
- Mary Harrison (artist)
- Jane Benham Hay
- Anna Mary Howitt
- Mary Moser
- Martha Darley Mutrie
- Ann Mary Newton
- Emily Mary Osborn
- Kate Perugini
- Louise Rayner
- Ellen Sharples
- Rolinda Sharples
- Rebecca Solomon
- Elizabeth Emma Soyer
- Isabelle de Steiger
- Henrietta Ward
