= Maria Bell =

English painter

Lady Maria Bell (née Hamilton; 26 December 1755 – 9 March 1825) was an English amateur painter and sculptor who worked in oils.

== Life ==
Maria Hamilton was born in Chelsea, London, the daughter of William Hamilton, an architect from a Scottish family, and his wife, Sarah. She was a pupil of her brother, the painter William Hamilton RA, and also studied under Sir Joshua Reynolds, whose works she copied with considerable skill. She likewise reproduced paintings by Peter Paul Rubens at Carlton House, including The Holy Family, which received high praise.

Around 1808, she married Sir Thomas Bell (1751–1824), a leather merchant and later Sheriff of London, who was knighted in 1816. His portrait was engraved by William Dickinson after a painting by Lady Bell. Between 1809 and 1824, she exhibited several figure subjects and portraits at the Royal Academy and other venues, including in 1816 portraits of Sir Matthew Wood, 1st Baronet, Lord Mayor of London, and of her husband. She also practised sculpture, exhibiting two busts at the Royal Academy in 1819.

Lady Bell died in Soho in 1825. Her portrait was later engraved by Edward Scriven from a miniature by W. S. Lethbridge.

== See also ==
English women painters from the early 19th century who exhibited at the Royal Academy of Art

- Sophie Gengembre Anderson
- Mary Baker
- Ann Charlotte Bartholomew
- Barbara Bodichon
- Joanna Mary Boyce
- Margaret Sarah Carpenter
- Fanny Corbaux
- Rosa Corder
- Mary Ellen Edwards
- Harriet Gouldsmith
- Mary Harrison (artist)
- Jane Benham Hay
- Anna Mary Howitt
- Mary Moser
- Martha Darley Mutrie
- Ann Mary Newton
- Emily Mary Osborn
- Kate Perugini
- Louise Rayner
- Ellen Sharples
- Rolinda Sharples
- Rebecca Solomon
- Elizabeth Emma Soyer
- Isabelle de Steiger
- Henrietta Ward
