= Joanna Mary Boyce =

British artist

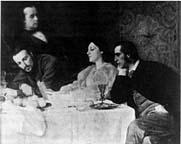
Henry Tanworth Wells' painting Conversation Piece, depicting George Price Boyce, John Clayton, Joanna Mary Boyce, and her eventual husband, the artist.

Joanna Mary Boyce (7 December 1831 – 15 July 1861) was a British painter associated with the Pre-Raphaelite Brotherhood. She is also known by her married name as Mrs. H.T. Wells, or as Joanna Mary Wells. She produced multiple works with historical themes (such as Elgiva, which received critical acclaim when it was exhibited in 1855), as well as portraits and sketches, and authored art criticism responding to her contemporaries. She was the sister of Pre-Raphaelite watercolourist George Price Boyce.

== Life ==
=== Early life and education ===
Joanna Mary Boyce, born in Maida Hill, London was the daughter of George Boyce, a former wine-merchant who had found prosperity as a pawnbroker, and his wife Anne.

Support from her father and her older brother George Price Boyce helped Joanna Mary Boyce achieve an early and rigorous education in the visual arts. She began a formal study of drawing by the age of eleven with Charles John Mayle Whichelo, and filled multiple sketchbooks as a young teenager. At the age of eighteen she entered Cary's art academy, and afterwards worked under James Mathews Leigh, at his school in Newman Street, London. In 1855, she took an extended trip to Paris, where she studied in Thomas Couture's atelier.

=== Career ===
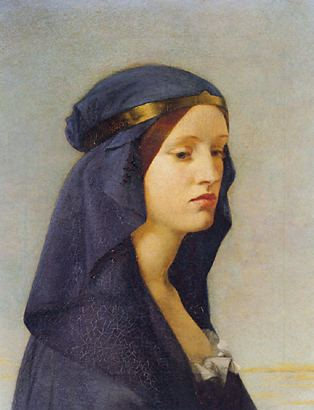
Elgiva (1855), oil on canvas, private collection.

Boyce first exhibited her artwork publicly in 1855 at the Royal Academy. Though Boyce exhibited two pieces, it was her painting Elgiva that won Boyce the admiration of such critics as John Ruskin and Ford Madox Brown. In it, Boyce depicted model Lizzie Ridley as a tragic heroine from Anglo-Saxon historical legend, possibly following the precedent of Pre-Raphaelite painter John Everett Millais who had depicted Elgiva eight years prior. Following the exhibition, Ruskin praised Boyce's painting:

The dignity of all the treatment—the beautiful imagination of faint but pure colour, place this picture, to my mind, among, those of the very highest power and promise. Complete achievement there is not in it as yet ... but if this artist, looking always to Nature and her own thoughts for the thing to be expressed, will strive to express them, with some memory of the great Venetians in her treatment of each separate hue, it seems to me that she might entertain the hope of taking place in the very first rank of painters.

Following her first exhibition, Boyce continued to pursue artistic excellence through extensive sketching and international art-viewing expeditions. She spent 1857 in Italy, and in December of that year married the portrait painter Henry Tanworth Wells (later a Royal Academician) in Rome.; he had first proposed to her several years before. Boyce used her time in Italy to work on paintings such as The Boys' Crusade and La Veneziana, a portrait of a Venetian lady. In addition to her own artistic practice at this time, Boyce also continued a lifelong practice of seeking out and analyzing the artwork of her contemporaries. Boyce published some of this analysis as art criticism in the Saturday Review, wherein she lauded the "sincerity" and principles of the Pre-Raphaelite art movement, and noted the positive influence of John Ruskin on the English art world.

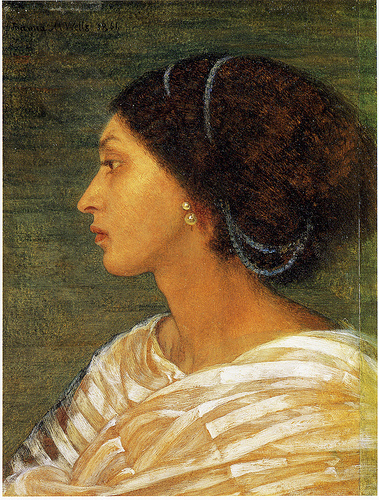
Head of a Mulatto Woman (1861). Portrait of Fanny Eaton

=== Final years ===
Boyce's later works include Fanny Eaton (formerly known as Head of a Mulatto Woman), a portrait of Jamaican immigrant and popular artists' model Fanny Eaton, now in the collection of the Yale Center for British Art.

Boyce died on 15 July 1861, after the birth of her third child. Her last completed painting, A Bird of God, was left on her easel.

== Legacy ==
At the time of her death, contemporaries remarked on Boyce's talent as an artist: Dante Gabriel Rossetti described her as "a wonderfully gifted woman", and another obituarist called her a genius.

Later critics have observed that Boyce’s reputation was somewhat constrained by her early death, but her art has been highlighted in exhibitions up until the present day. One early posthumous exhibition was held in the Tate in 1935. Select artworks by Boyce, along with portraits by and of other women significant to the Pre-Raphaelite movement, were exhibited in London’s National Portrait Gallery in 2019 in an exhibit entitled "Pre-Raphaelite Sisters". Not all of Boyce's artworks survive, as some were destroyed in bombings during World War II.

Despite Boyce’s frequently mentioned association with the Pre-Raphaelite movement, commentators have noted that Boyce was not simply an acolyte of the Pre-Raphaelite Brotherhood. The art historian Pamela Gerrish Nunn notes that Boyce drew comparisons to the Venetian old masters from contemporary critics. Writer Simon Poë additionally observes that Boyce's time at Couture's atelier impacted her work with influences from the Classical Academic and Romantic traditions.

== Gallery ==
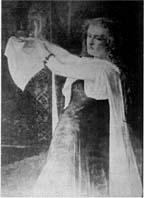
Joanna Mary Boyce, Rowena Offering the Wassail Cup to Voltigern (photographic reproduction), 1856

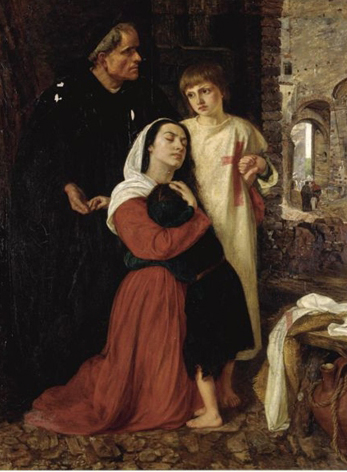
Joanna Mary Boyce, The Departure: An Episode of the Child's Crusade 13th Century, 1857-1861

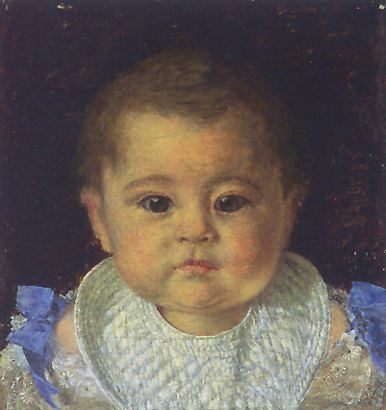
Joanna Mary Boyce, Portrait of Sidney Wells, 1859

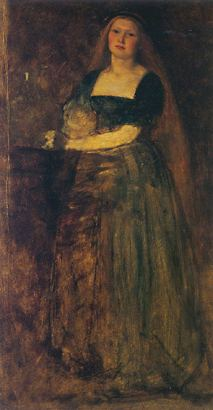
Joanna Mary Boyce, Gretchen (unfinished), 1861

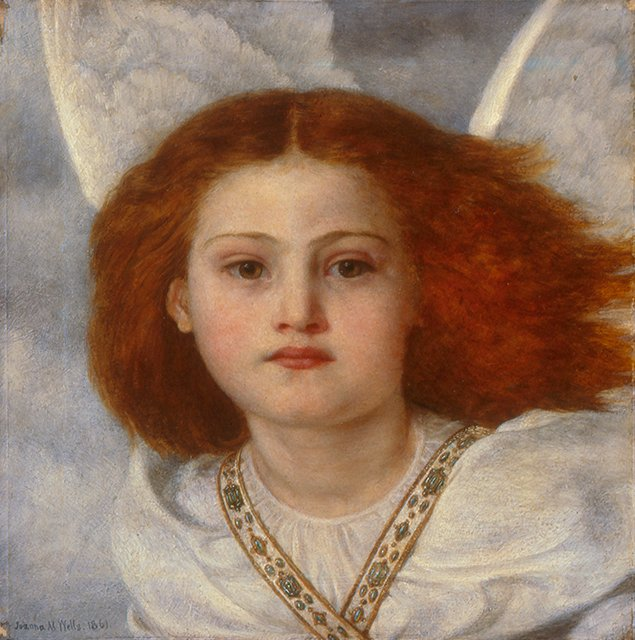
Joanna Mary Boyce, A Bird of God, 1861

== See also ==
English women painters from the early 19th century who exhibited at the Royal Academy of Art

- Sophie Gengembre Anderson
- Mary Baker
- Ann Charlotte Bartholomew
- Maria Bell
- Barbara Bodichon
- Margaret Sarah Carpenter
- Fanny Corbaux
- Rosa Corder
- Mary Ellen Edwards
- Harriet Gouldsmith
- Mary Harrison (artist)
- Jane Benham Hay
- Anna Mary Howitt
- Mary Moser
- Martha Darley Mutrie
- Ann Mary Newton
- Emily Mary Osborn
- Kate Perugini
- Louise Rayner
- Ellen Sharples
- Rolinda Sharples
- Rebecca Solomon
- Elizabeth Emma Soyer
- Isabelle de Steiger
- Henrietta Ward

== Sources ==
- Bradbury, Sue. Joanna, George and Henry: A Pre-Raphaelite Tale of Art, Love and Friendship. London: The Boydell Press, 2012.
- Cherry, Deborah. Painting Women: Victorian Women Artists. Routledge, 1993.
- Marsh, Jan and Nunn, Pamela G. Pre-Raphaelite Women Artists. Manchester Art Gallery, 1998.
- Nunn, Pamela G."Making a Centre on the Margins" in Re-Framing the Pre-Raphaelites, Ellen Harding ed., Scolar Press, 1996: 43-60.
- Nunn, Pamela G. "Artist and Model: JMB's Mulatto," Journal of Pre-Raphaelite Studies 2.2 (Fall 1993): 12-15.

Attribution:
