= Rosa Corder =

English painter

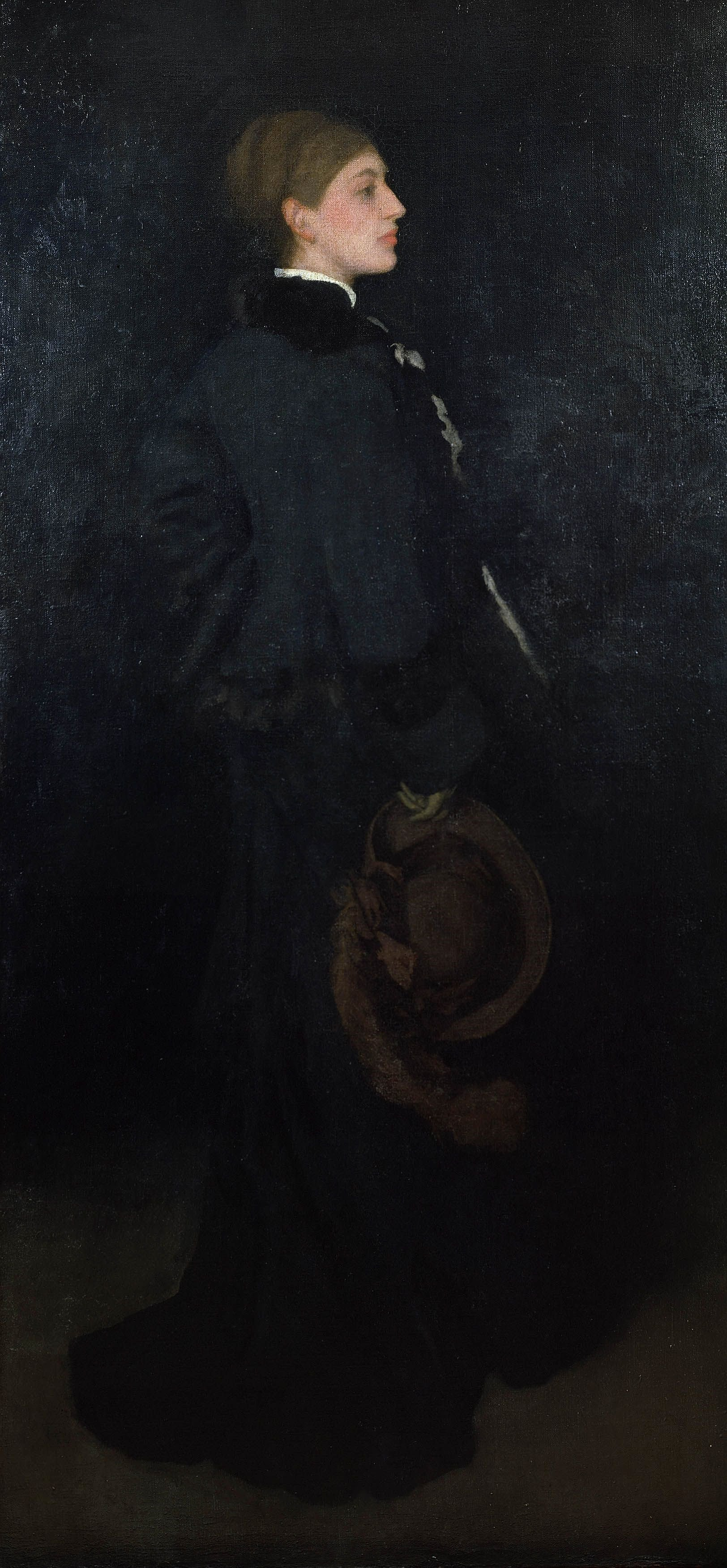
James Abbott McNeill Whistler, Arrangement in Brown and Black: Portrait of Rosa Corder, 1876-1878, Frick Collection

Rosa Frances Corder (18 May 1853 – 28 November 1893) was a Victorian artist and artist's model. She was the lover of Charles Augustus Howell, who is alleged to have persuaded her to create forgeries of drawings by Dante Gabriel Rossetti.

== Career ==
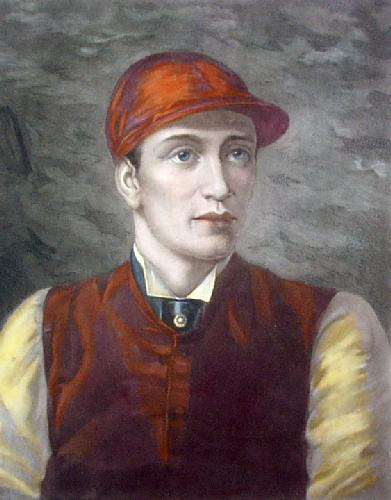
Rosa Corder, Fred Archer (1857 –1886), Restrike etching - made before artist's death in 1893

Corder was the daughter of Micah Corder (1808–88), a London merchant, and Charlotte Hill. She trained as a portrait painter under Felix Moscheles and Frederick Sandys and exhibited at the Royal Academy of Arts and the Grosvenor Gallery. Her portrait of Edward Bouverie Pusey was considered "the best likeness" of the scholar by the editors of his collected works and was engraved as the frontispiece to his biography.

She had a studio in Southampton Row and another in Newmarket, where she painted racehorses, building a reputation among the sporting fraternity. She painted both animals and portraits of jockeys, including Frederick Archer.

== Relationship with Howell ==
Corder was described by Ellen Terry as "one of those plain-beautiful women who are far more attractive than some of the pretty ones. She had wonderful hair – like a fair pale veil, a white waxen face and a very good figure; and she wore very odd clothes." According to James McNeill Whistler's biographer Stanley Weintraub she "exuded sexual appeal and knew it".

Corder became the lover of Charles Augustus Howell in 1873. Howell is alleged to have persuaded her to create drawings in the style of Dante Gabriel Rossetti, which Howell could pass off as originals. Corder is also said to have forged Fuselis. Drawings derived from Rossetti's stained-glass window designs depicting the story of Saint George and the Dragon are attributed to her.

In 1883 Corder gave birth to a girl by Howell; their daughter was christened Beatrice Ellen Howell.

== As model ==
Corder was painted by Whistler in his Arrangement in Black and Brown, in the Frick Collection. The portrait was commissioned by Howell. Whistler may have had a dalliance with her at the time. She was also portrayed by Mortimer Menpes. Her relationship with Howell was caricatured by Max Beerbohm in Rossetti and his Circle (1922).

== See also ==
English women painters from the early 19th century who exhibited at the Royal Academy of Art

- Sophie Gengembre Anderson
- Mary Baker
- Ann Charlotte Bartholomew
- Maria Bell
- Barbara Bodichon
- Joanna Mary Boyce
- Margaret Sarah Carpenter
- Fanny Corbaux
- Mary Ellen Edwards
- Harriet Gouldsmith
- Mary Harrison (artist)
- Jane Benham Hay
- Anna Mary Howitt
- Mary Moser
- Martha Darley Mutrie
- Ann Mary Newton
- Emily Mary Osborn
- Kate Perugini
- Louise Rayner
- Ellen Sharples
- Rolinda Sharples
- Rebecca Solomon
- Elizabeth Emma Soyer
- Isabelle de Steiger
- Henrietta Ward
