= Martha Darley Mutrie =

British painter (1824–1885)

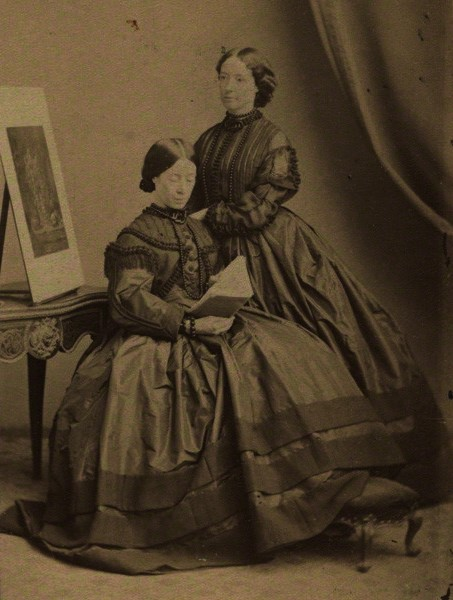
Martha Darley Mutrie and Annie Feray Mutrie, 1860, Maull & Company, National Portrait Gallery, London

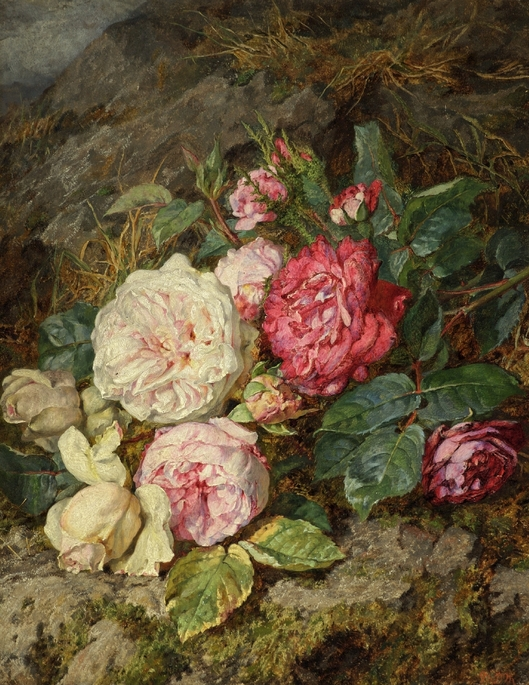
Martha Darley Mutrie, Roses, oil on canvas. Russell-Cotes Art Gallery & Museum; Presented by Sir Merton Russell-Cotes, 1921.

Martha Darley Mutrie (26 August 1824 – 30 December 1885) was a British painter. Her paintings consisted mostly of fruit and flowers. She grew up in Manchester, England, and studied at the Manchester School of Design. Mutrie's works were shown at the Royal Academy of Arts, Royal Manchester Institution and other national and international exhibitions. Her works are among the collections of the Victoria and Albert Museum and the Russell-Cotes Art Gallery & Museum.

== Personal life ==
Martha Mutrie was born in Ardwick on 26 August 1824, and was the oldest daughter of Robert Mutrie, a cotton trader from Rothesay, Bute, Scotland. She had one younger sister, Annie Feray Mutrie, born on 6 March 1826 in Manchester. Her family soon settled in Manchester. Martha Mutrie moved to London in 1854, and died in Kensington, England on 30 December 1885. Her sister, Annie died on 28 September 1893 in Brighton.

== Education and career ==
Mutrie studied under George Wallis at the Manchester School of Design between the years of 1844 to 1846. She continued her education at Wallis' private academy. Mutrie exhibited at the Royal Academy of Arts, the Royal Manchester Institution, and other English and international exhibitions. Fruit and Spring Flowers were shown at the Royal Academy in 1853 and 1854, respectively. John Ruskin appreciated her works, Primulas and Geraniums, at the academy's 1856 exhibition and commented upon them in his "Notes on some of the Principal Pictures in the Royal Academy." Mutrie has a painting in the Victoria and Albert Museum and the Russell-Cotes Art Gallery & Museum.

== See also ==
English women painters from the early 19th century who exhibited at the Royal Academy of Art

- Sophie Gengembre Anderson
- Mary Baker
- Ann Charlotte Bartholomew
- Maria Bell
- Barbara Bodichon
- Joanna Mary Boyce
- Margaret Sarah Carpenter
- Fanny Corbaux
- Rosa Corder
- Mary Ellen Edwards
- Harriet Gouldsmith
- Mary Harrison (artist)
- Jane Benham Hay
- Anna Mary Howitt
- Mary Moser
- Ann Mary Newton
- Emily Mary Osborn
- Kate Perugini
- Louise Rayner
- Ellen Sharples
- Rolinda Sharples
- Rebecca Solomon
- Elizabeth Emma Soyer
- Isabelle de Steiger
- Henrietta Ward
