= Ann Mary Newton =

English painter (1832–1866)

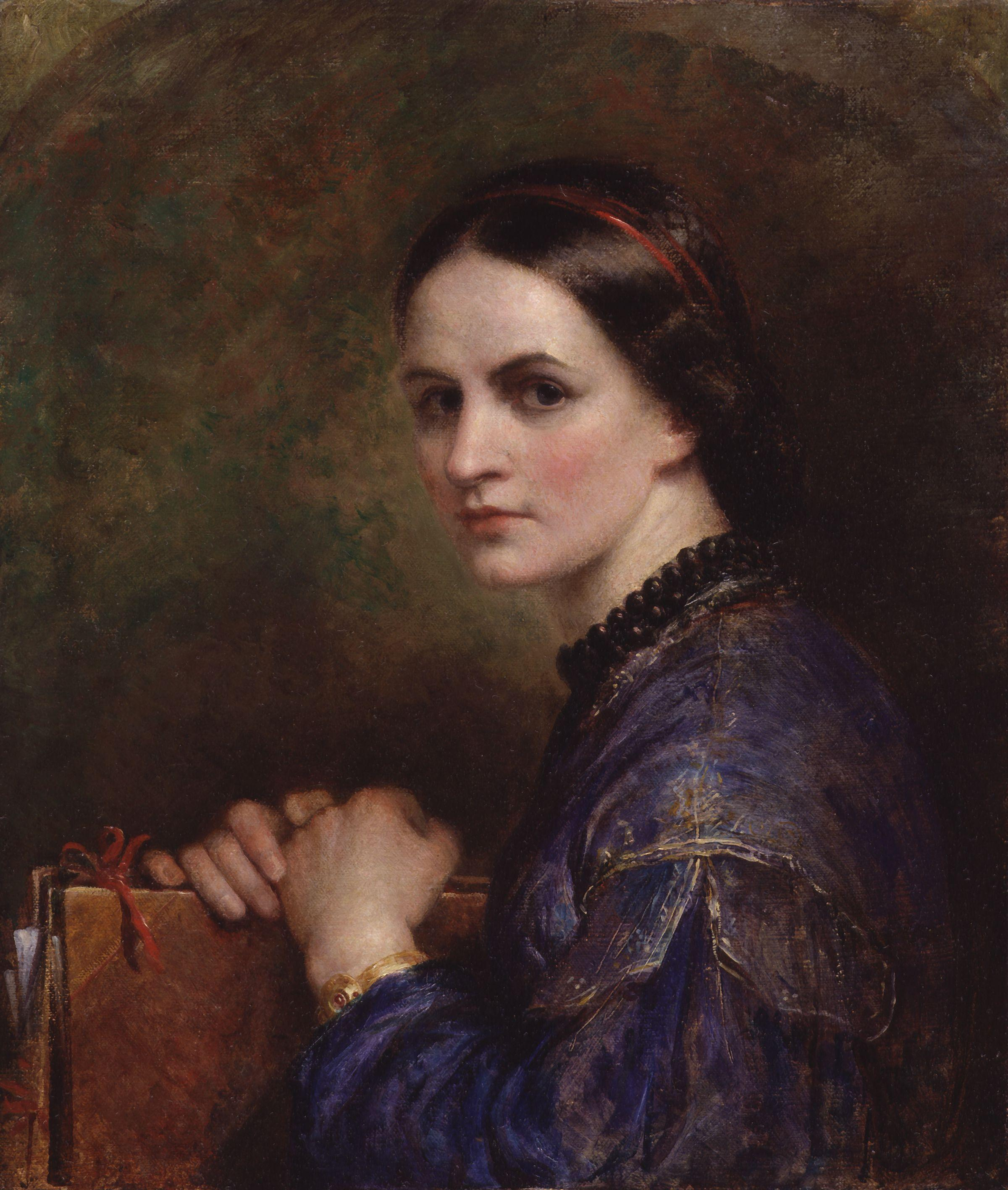
- Self portrait
- Born: Ann Mary Severn; 29 June 1832; Rome, Papal States (now Italy)
- Died: 2 January 1866 (aged 33); London, United Kingdom
- Known for: Painting
- Spouse: Charles Thomas Newton (m. 1861)

Ann Mary Newton (née Severn; 29 June 1832 – 2 January 1866) was an English painter. She specialized in portraits of children and worked in crayon, chalk, pastel and watercolour. Newton studied in England under George Richmond and in Paris under Ary Scheffer. Her works were exhibited at the Royal Academy of Art between 1852 and 1865.

== Biography ==
Ann Mary Newton was born in Rome, where her father Joseph Severn was the British Consul. Joseph Severn was an artist and a friend of the poet Keats. Newton was taught to draw by her father, and then on the Severn family's return to England in 1841, studied with George Richmond, who employed her to produce copies of portraits he had painted. In 1857 she received lessons from Ary Scheffer in Paris. In Paris she painted a portrait of Mary Bruce, Countess of Elgin which was well reviewed and led to further society commissions in Britain. She specialised in portraits of children and worked in crayon, chalk, pastel and watercolour. In the mid-1850s she supported her family with a number of commissions, travelling to the homes of wealthy patrons. Her first picture to be exhibited at the Royal Academy of Arts was The Twins in 1852, a portrait of her younger brother and sister. During this time she also painted portraits of Queen Victoria's nephew and children.

In 1861 she married the archaeologist Charles Thomas Newton, who became Keeper of Greek and Roman Antiquities at the British Museum. She made drawings of Greek sculpture for his public lectures and also designed illustrations for his History of the Discoveries at Helicarnassus, Cnidus, and Branchidae (2 vols, 1862–63) and Travels and Discoveries in the Levant (2 vols, 1865). A number of her sketchbooks, which make up an important picture-diary of her travels in the eastern Mediterranean and contain witty caricatures of the family, are in the possession of Severn descendants.

In the 1860s she began to work in oils and exhibited a number of pictures in the Royal Academy exhibitions, most notably a self-portrait (National Portrait Gallery, London) and an Arthurian subject from Tennyson, Elaine (exhibited in 1863). She died of measles in 1866 at her home, 74 Gower Street, Bloomsbury. at the age of thirty-three, having had no children. Queen Victoria mentions her tragic early death in her Journal of 7 January 1866: "Greatly shocked at the death of Mrs Newton, (Miss Severn) a pretty, clever young artist, who painted several of the family & did also beautiful copies of the Old Masters".

Her work is included in the collections of the National Portrait Gallery, London and the Tate Gallery, London.

== See also ==
English women painters from the early 19th century who exhibited at the Royal Academy of Art

- Sophie Gengembre Anderson
- Mary Baker
- Ann Charlotte Bartholomew
- Maria Bell
- Barbara Bodichon
- Joanna Mary Boyce
- Margaret Sarah Carpenter
- Fanny Corbaux
- Rosa Corder
- Mary Ellen Edwards
- Harriet Gouldsmith
- Mary Harrison (artist)
- Jane Benham Hay
- Anna Mary Howitt
- Mary Moser
- Martha Darley Mutrie
- Emily Mary Osborn
- Kate Perugini
- Louise Rayner
- Ellen Sharples
- Rolinda Sharples
- Rebecca Solomon
- Elizabeth Emma Soyer
- Isabelle de Steiger
- Henrietta Ward

== Sources ==
- Oxford Dictionary of National Biography (2004).
- Against Oblivion: The Life of Joseph Severn, by Sheila Birkenhead, 1943 London.
- Illustrious Friends: The Story of Joseph Severn and His Son Arthur, by Sheila Birkenhead, 1965 New York.
