= Mary Baker (painter) =

English painter

Mary Baker (fl. 1842 – 1856) was an English painter of portraits and portrait miniatures.

She was born in London and produced works for the Society of Arts, as well as exhibiting miniatures and portraits at the Royal Academy over a fourteen-year period (1842–1856). An example of her work, painted in oils, is preserved in the Victoria & Albert Museum in London.

== See also ==
English women painters from the early 19th century who exhibited at the Royal Academy of Art

- Sophie Gengembre Anderson
- Ann Charlotte Bartholomew
- Maria Bell
- Barbara Bodichon
- Joanna Mary Boyce
- Margaret Sarah Carpenter
- Fanny Corbaux
- Rosa Corder
- Mary Ellen Edwards
- Harriet Gouldsmith
- Mary Harrison (artist)
- Jane Benham Hay
- Anna Mary Howitt
- Mary Moser
- Martha Darley Mutrie
- Ann Mary Newton
- Emily Mary Osborn
- Kate Perugini
- Louise Rayner
- Ellen Sharples
- Rolinda Sharples
- Rebecca Solomon
- Elizabeth Emma Soyer
- Isabelle de Steiger
- Henrietta Ward
