= Ellen Sharples =

British artist (1769–1849)

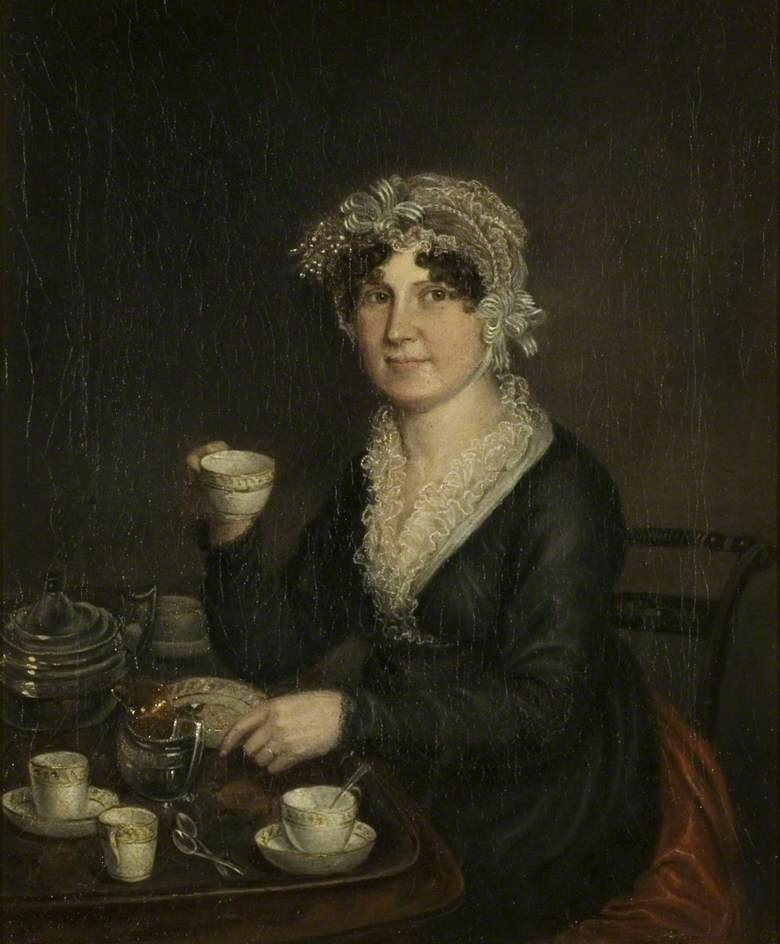
- Portrait of Sharples, painted by her daughter, Rolinda, c. 1814.
- Born: Ellen Wallace; 4 March 1769; Bath, Somerset or Birmingham
- Died: 14 March 1849 (aged 80); Bristol
- Known for: Painting, Miniaturist
- Notable work: George Washington, Joseph Banks
- Movement: Portrait, Silhouette
- Spouse: James Sharples (m. 1778; died 1811)
- Children: 2 (incl. Rolinda)

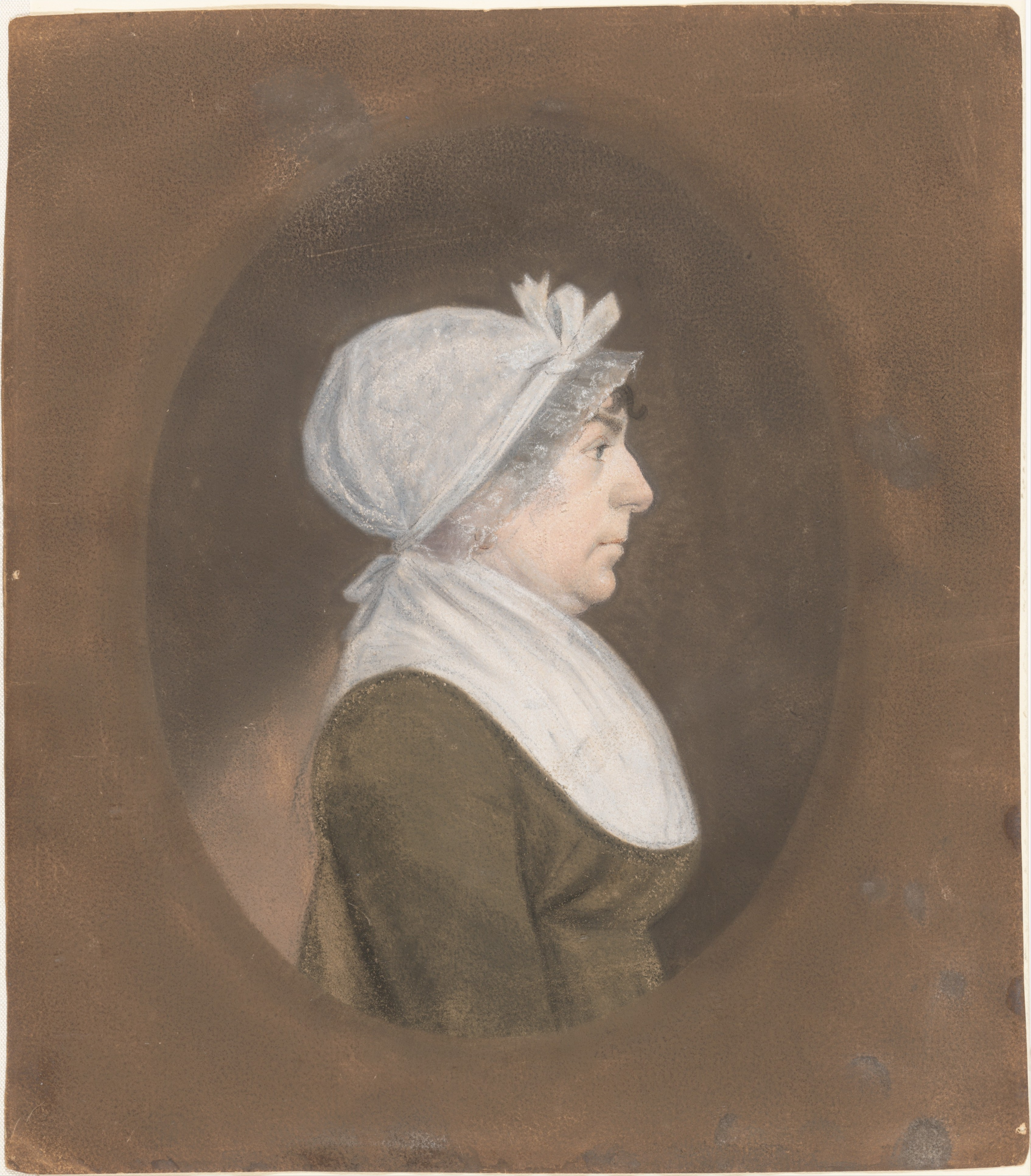
Dorothea Hart, attributed to James Sharples, possibly Ellen Sharples, 1809, British

Ellen Wallace Sharples (4 March 1769 – 14 March 1849) was an English painter specialized in portraits in pastel and in watercolor miniatures on ivory. She exhibited five miniatures at the Royal Academy in 1807, and founded the Bristol Fine Arts Academy in 1844 with a substantial gift.

== Biography ==
Ellen Wallace was born in Lancaster. She studied drawing with James Sharples in Bath, her only known art training, and married him in 1787. The couple had two children, both of whom were also painters: James Sharples, Jr. (b. 1788) and Rolinda Sharples (b. 1793). James, who had been widowed twice before, had two sons from his previous marriages, George, with his first wife, and Felix (b. 1786 and also an artist) with his second wife.

=== America, 1794-1801 ===
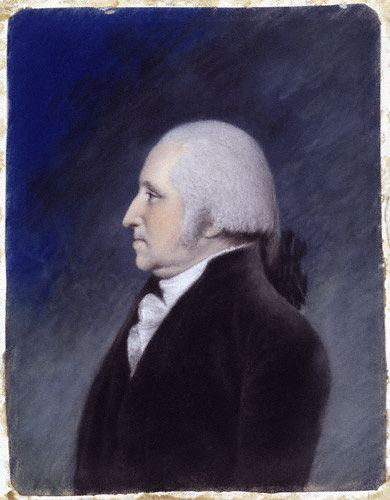
George Washington, 1796–1797, Ellen Sharples

The couple emigrated to the United States around 1794 in a harrowing voyage, in which their ship was commandeered by a French privateer. The family was interned at Brest for seven months, and Ellen would later write of the ordeal in her diary: "Our family have experienced; severely experienced much of its misery, and much did we witness during our seven months captivity in France, too heart rending to recall."

They eventually made it to America in a move that echoed the fashion of English artists who took advantage of the growing demand for portraiture in the New World. Living in Washington, DC James had great success painting portraits of American leaders (including George Washington). Around 1797, while they were living in Philadelphia, Ellen first began to draw portraits professionally in order to supplement the family's income. Responding to the great demand for affordable copies, Ellen's career thrived in copying her husband's original portraits on commission, and her miniature copies were priced the same as her husband's. Small portraits, such as the Sharples turned out, were a viable and affordable alternative to the large scale formal portraits of Gilbert Stuart and John Trumbull. Competition from other small portrait painters was stiff, and in looking for opportunities for commissions, the family became itinerant. They lived and worked in Philadelphia and New York City, and traveled through New England in a specially constructed carriage that carried the family, their collection, and their equipment.

When they were still very young, the Sharples children began to draw, and Ellen began to personally train her daughter, Rolinda, in the art of painting and drawing. The children joined the family enterprise when they were still in their teens, Felix at the age of 17, James Jr. at the age of 15, and Rolinda at the age of 13.

=== Return to England, 1801–1809 ===
In 1801, the family returned to Bath because of their fears of the Franco-American war. Much of the information that is known about the family during this period comes from Ellen Sharples' diaries and letters, and in 1803, Ellen wrote about her daughter:

Drawing, reading and instructing my dear Rolinda continues greatly to interest me, as they have done for many years....Mr. S. delights to instruct her in arithmetic and natural philosophy...I attend to her reading, writing, drawing, geography, French, etc.

During this interim period, Ellen also exhibited her miniatures at the Royal Academy of Arts.

=== America, 1809–1811 ===
In 1806, the family had plans to return to America, but their ship was damaged in a storm and they had to return to port. Felix and James Jr. were given permission to return at this time, and James, Ellen, and Rolinda joined them three years later. During their second stay in America, they lived in New York, New Jersey, and Pennsylvania, continuing their portrait commissions. James Sharples became ill in 1810, and in the winter of 1811, he died. After settling the will, Ellen, Rolinda, and James Jr. returned to England, and Felix elected to remain in America, pursuing a career as a portrait artist.

=== Bristol, England, 1811–1849 ===
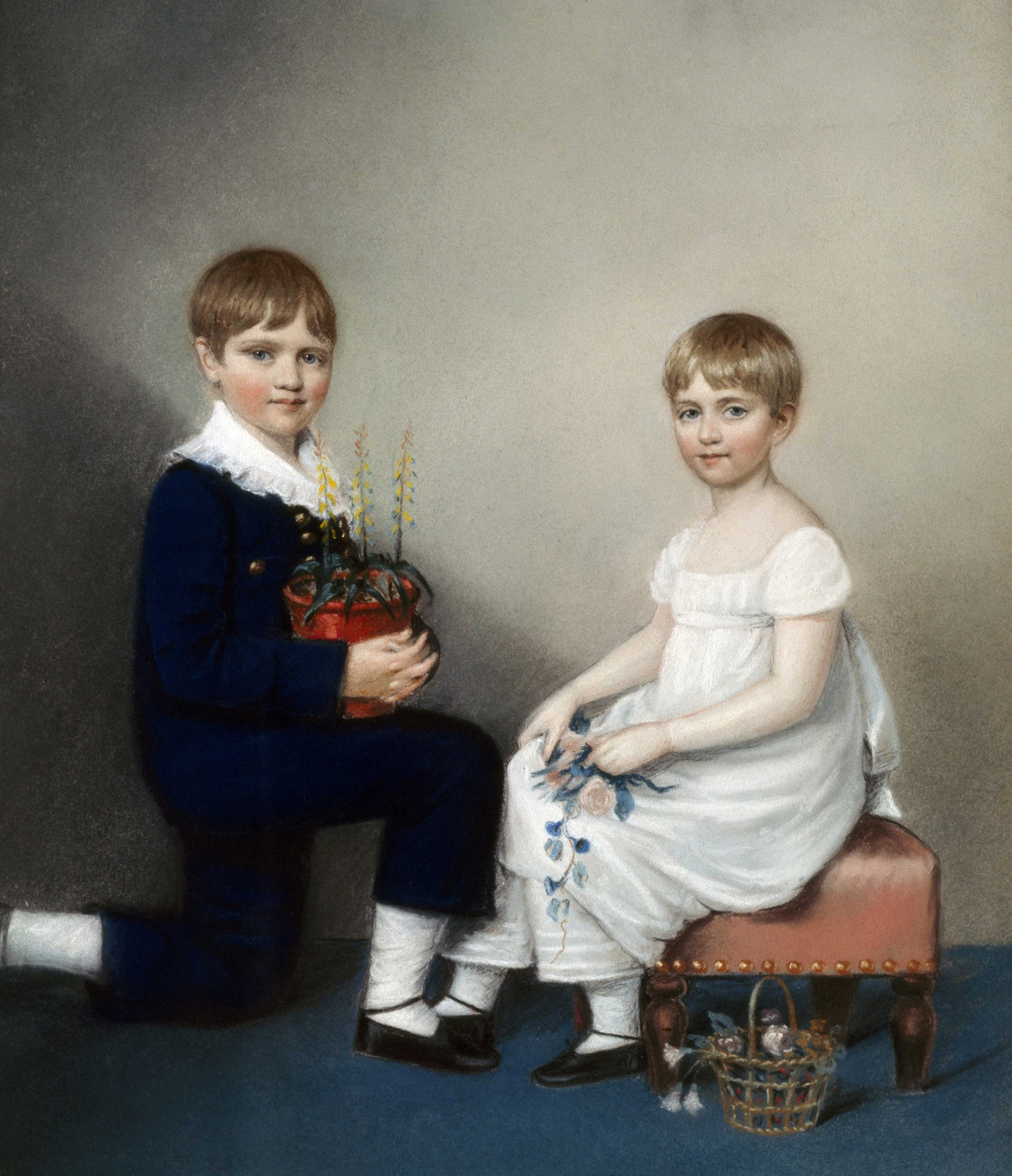
An 1816 chalk drawing of Charles Darwin at age six with his sister Catherine, by Ellen Sharples

Ellen's itinerant life was over after her husband's death, and she settled permanently in Clifton, where she, James Jr. and Rolinda rented an apartment. The three members of the family concentrated on establishing a portrait practice. Rolinda's career took on a different and more ambitious direction, for she began to paint large portraits and complicated group scenes in oils. James, Jr., who lived a more independent life from his mother and sister, continued to paint portraits such as John King. Ellen's diary references to Felix end in 1823, and she made no mention that her children ever married. The family was successful, but both her children predeceased her. Rolinda died of breast cancer in 1838, and James Jr. died of tuberculosis in 1839. Of her loss, Ellen wrote to her friend, Miss Sarjeant:

that in my recent losses, my feelings must have been agonizing; for you knew how uniformly exemplary were the affectionate kindness of my dear highly gifted son & daughter to their mother, how devoted she was, placing all her happiness in them....

She was near 72 years of age when she wrote those words. When Ellen died in 1849 she left a substantial estate of £4,000 to the Bristol Academy for the Promotion of Fine Arts which was instrumental in financing Bristol's first art gallery, now the Royal West of England Academy. She had helped found the Academy several years earlier with a gift of £2,000.

== Personal papers ==
Letters, legal papers, bank and account books relating to James and Ellen Sharples and their family are held at Bristol Archives (Ref. 15395) (online catalogue). A number of paintings by Ellen and Rolinda Sharples can be seen on display at Bristol City Museum and Art Gallery and M Shed museum.

== Paintings ==
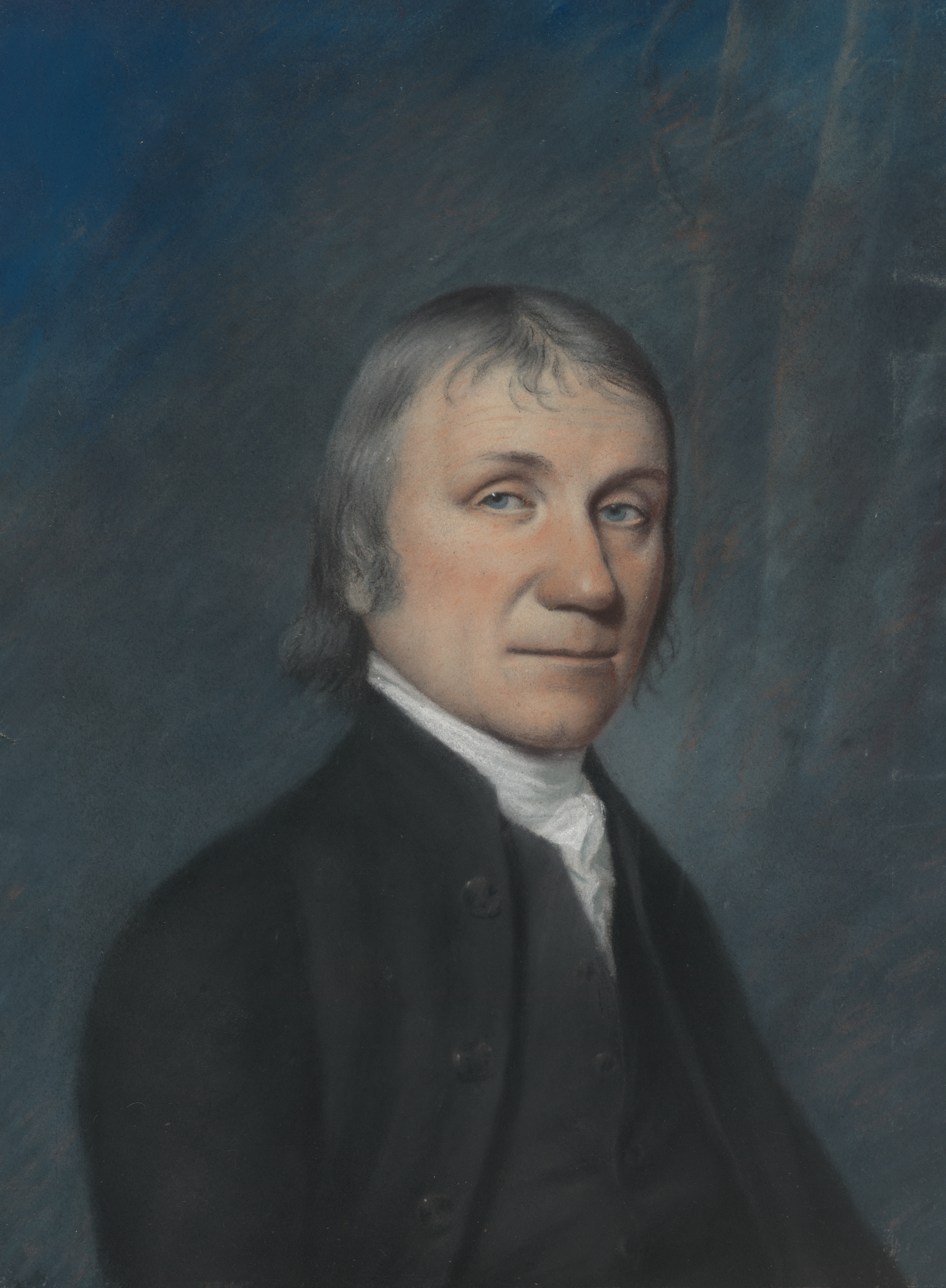
Joseph Priestley, 1797.

Ellen Sharples began her artistic career making copies of her husband's pastel portraits. Between 1794 and 1810, her copies followed a similar format of 9"x 7" portraits on gray or tanned paper. She taught herself how to make miniature watercolor copies on ivory, and between 1803 and 1810 she made miniature portraits either from copies or from life. The income from Ellen's and her children's paintings made the family affluent, and she wrote in her diary:

Copies were frequently required; these I undertook, and was far successful, as to have as many commissions as I could execute; they were thought equal to the original, price the same: we lived in good style associating in the first society.

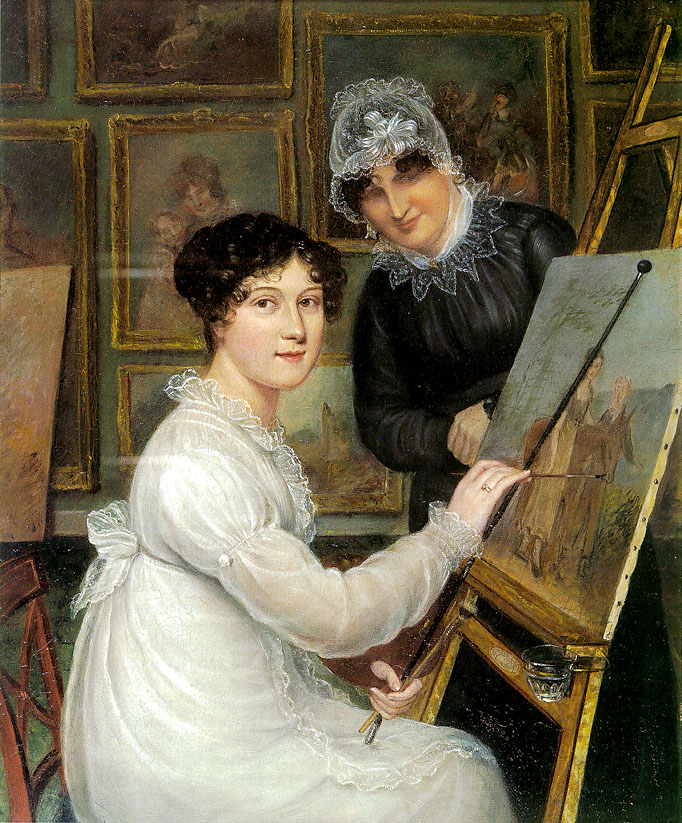
The Artist and her Mother. Self-portrait of Rolinda Sharples with her mother Ellen Sharples, 1816

After 1810, Ellen no longer mentions her own work in her diaries, yet the family continued to practice as portrait painters in Bristol. Ellen's subjects included Joseph Priestley, Martha and George Washington, Benjamin Rush, John and Mrs. Bard, Eleanor Parke Custis, Alexander Hamilton, Sir Joseph Banks, and the Marquis de Lafayette. Today, her works can be found in many museums in the United States, including the Metropolitan Museum of Art, the National Gallery of Art, and the Independence National Historical Park Collection. She died in Wybunbury, Cheshire.

Ellen's daughter Rolinda Sharples became an oil painter of some renown. One of her largest pieces of work was The Trial of Colonel Brereton, painted in 1834, which is on display at M Shed in Bristol.

== Royal Academy paintings ==
From the listing in a book of the Royal Academy exhibitors one can see that Ellen Sharples exhibited her works in 1807, when the family had moved back to England for a short time. She is listed as "Mrs. James (Ellen) Sharples, Miniature painter".

- H. Brown, Esqand Dr. Priestley
- T. Newman, Esq.
- Dr. Priestley

== See also ==
- Royal West of England Academy

English women painters from the early 19th century who exhibited at the Royal Academy of Art

- Sophie Gengembre Anderson
- Mary Baker
- Ann Charlotte Bartholomew
- Maria Bell
- Barbara Bodichon
- Joanna Mary Boyce
- Margaret Sarah Carpenter
- Fanny Corbaux
- Rosa Corder
- Mary Ellen Edwards
- Harriet Gouldsmith
- Mary Harrison (artist)
- Jane Benham Hay
- Anna Mary Howitt
- Mary Moser
- Martha Darley Mutrie
- Ann Mary Newton
- Emily Mary Osborn
- Kate Perugini
- Louise Rayner
- Rolinda Sharples
- Rebecca Solomon
- Elizabeth Emma Soyer
- Isabelle de Steiger
- Henrietta Ward
