= Ann Charlotte Bartholomew =

English flower and miniature painter, and author

- Born: Anne Charlotte Fayerman; 20 March 1800; Loddon, Norfolk, United Kingdom
- Died: 18 August 1862 (aged 62); London, United Kingdom
- Known for: Painting, Writing
- Spouses: Walter Turnbull (m. 1827–1838) Valentine Bartholomew (m. 1840)

Ann Charlotte Bartholomew (1800–1862), was an English flower and miniature painter, and author.

== Life ==
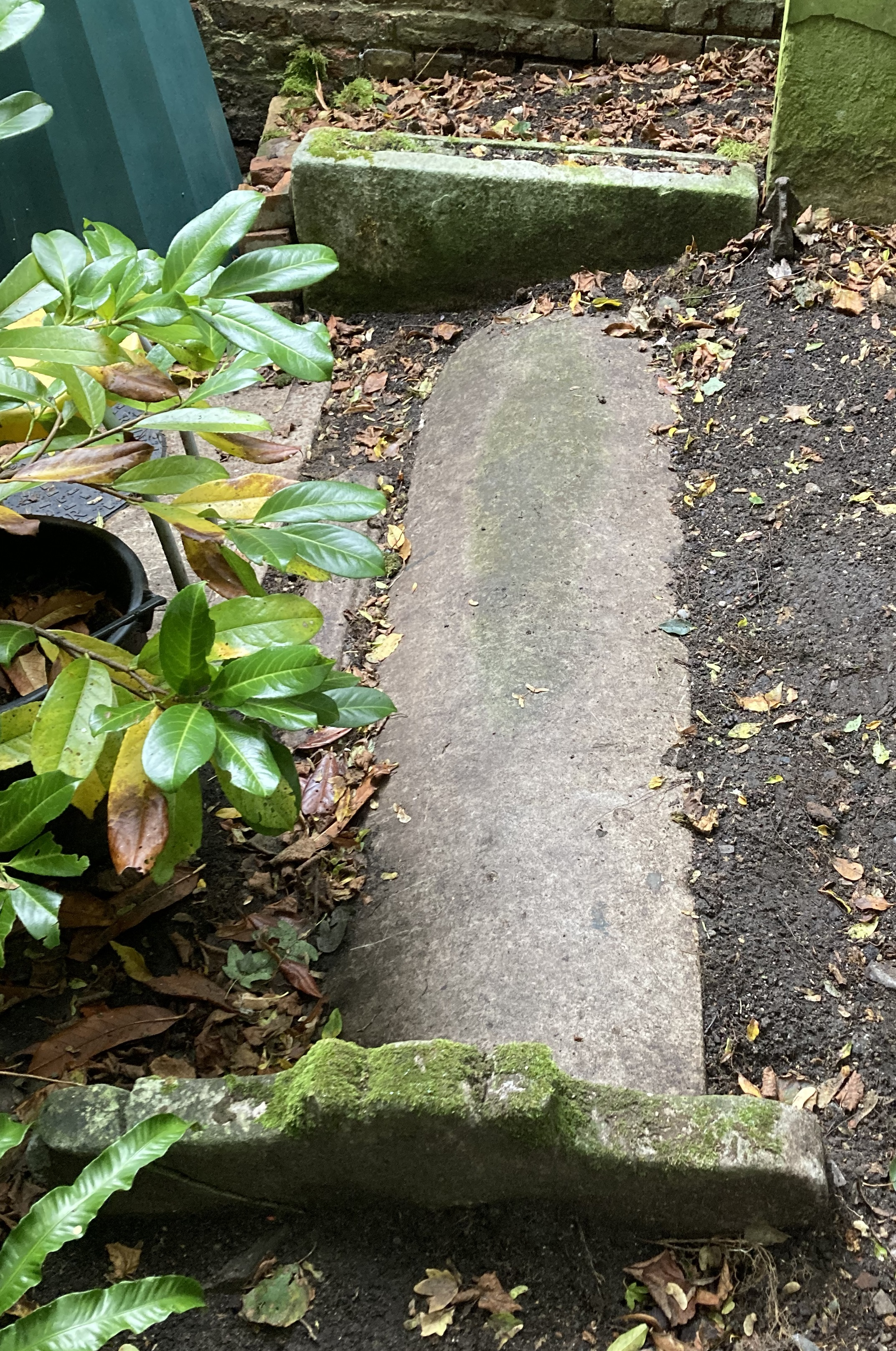
Grave of Valentine and Ann Bartholemew in Highgate Cemetery

Bartholomew was born on 20 March 1800 in Loddon, Norfolk, the daughter of Arnall Fayermann and niece of John Thomas, bishop of Rochester. In 1827 she married the composer Walter Turnbull who died in 1838.

She exhibited at the British Institution and the Royal Academy. and the Society of British Artists. She was a founding member of the Society of Female Artists, after petitioning the Royal Academy to open its schools to women.

In 1840 she published Songs of Azrael and other poems under the name of Mrs. Turnbull. In the same year she became the second wife of the flower painter, Valentine Bartholomew. After this, she began painting still-life fruits and flowers. The British Museum has one watercolour of this kind, "Study of a Garden Poppy" But her main employment was miniatures for brooches and jewellery.

Her play The Ring, or the Farmer's Daughter, a domestic drama in two acts, appeared in 1845, and another, a farce called It's Only My Aunt was first performed at the Marylebone Theatre in 1849. Both of these are widely available in microform as part of the English and American Drama of the 19th Century series.

She last exhibited in 1857, and died on 18 August 1862. She is buried with Valentine Bartholomew on the western side of Highgate Cemetery. The grave (plot no.11876) is immediately to the right of the north gatekeeper's lodge.

== See also ==
English women painters from the early 19th century who exhibited at the Royal Academy of Art

- Sophie Gengembre Anderson
- Mary Baker
- Maria Bell
- Barbara Bodichon
- Joanna Mary Boyce
- Margaret Sarah Carpenter
- Fanny Corbaux
- Rosa Corder
- Mary Ellen Edwards
- Harriet Gouldsmith
- Mary Harrison (artist)
- Jane Benham Hay
- Anna Mary Howitt
- Mary Moser
- Martha Darley Mutrie
- Ann Mary Newton
- Emily Mary Osborn
- Kate Perugini
- Louise Rayner
- Ellen Sharples
- Rolinda Sharples
- Rebecca Solomon
- Emma Soyer
- Isabelle de Steiger
- Henrietta Ward
