= Emily Osborn =

Emily Osborn may refer to:

- Emily Osborn (Marvel Comics), a supporting character in Marvel Comics
- Emily Mary Osborn (1828–1925), English painter
