= Rebecca Solomon =

British painter (1832-1886)

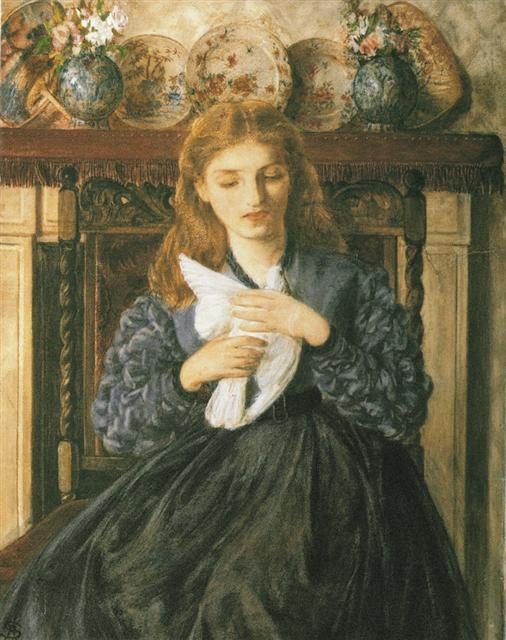
- The painting: The Wounded Dove
- Born: 26 September 1832; London, England
- Died: 20 November 1886 (age 54); London, England
- Known for: Painting
- Notable work: The Governess (1854); The Young Teacher (1861)
- Movement: Pre-Raphaelite

Rebecca Solomon (London 26 September 1832 – 20 November 1886 London) was a 19th-century English Pre-Raphaelite draftsman, illustrator, engraver, and painter of social injustices. She is the second of three children who all became artists, in a prominent Jewish family.

== Biography ==
Rebecca Solomon was born on 26 September 1832, the youngest of the three daughters, and she was one of eight children born into an artistically-inclined Jewish merchant family in Bishopsgate in east London. Her father was Michael (Meyer) Solomon, the first Jew to be honoured with the Freedom of the City of London; her mother was Catherine (Kate) Levy. Solomon was the lesser-known artist to her painter brothers Simeon Solomon (1840–1905) and Abraham Solomon (1824–1862). There were five other children in the family: Aaron, Betsy, Isaac, Ellen, and Sylvester.

Initially Solomon was taught by her older brother Abraham and worked in his studio as an apprentice and copyist. She also, took lessons at the Spitalfields School of Design. Solomon exhibited at the Royal Academy of Arts between 1852 and 1868, and also at the Dudley Gallery and Gambart's French Gallery.

Solomon worked in the studio of John Everett Millais, one of founders of the Pre-Raphaelite Brotherhood. She also worked with the second wave Pre-Raphaelite artist, Edward Burne-Jones. Solomon taught her younger brother, Simeon, much of what she learned from her assistant-ship to Millais. Solomon was also active in contemporary social reform movements and in 1859 she joined a group of thirty-eight women artists petitioning the Royal Academy of Arts to open its schools to women, which led to the first woman, Laura Herford, being admitted to the Academy in 1860.

After her elder brother, Abraham's death in 1862, she made sure to find work outside of his studio. As a result, Solomon broadened her material use when developing new works of art. Her newer mediums included: illustration and watercolors.

Her last recorded exhibition was in 1874.

In 1886, Solomon died aged 54, from injuries sustained after being run over by a hansom cab on the Euston Road in central London.

== Themes within her work ==
Solomon's artistic style was typical of popular 19th-century painting at the time and falls under the category of genre painting. She used her visual images to critique ethnic, gender and class prejudice in Victorian England. When Solomon started painting genre scenes, her work demonstrated an observant eye for class, ethnic and gender discrimination. Solomon's paintings reflect a combination of interest in the theatre and commitment to social consciousness that does not exist in other artist's painting in the nineteenth century.

One critic commented on the wholesome, moral and sometimes humanizing sentiment in her art, not an uncommon element in Victorian painting. However, Solomon's Jewish background was probably instrumental in developing her critical consciousness of difference and prejudice. Over the next ten to fifteen years, her artwork explored the plight of women and minorities, and the dominance of class discrimination in English society. She is considered among the first women from a Jewish background to make a prominent career as a painter in Britain.

In the late 1850s Solomon made a successful transition to classical and historical painting, the most highly valued genre of art within the powerful art academies of the time. True to her vision, she continued to include images that reflected the historical foundations of nineteenth-century social injustice.

The Governess (1854), compares the lives of two women within a Victorian home; One being an isolated working-class woman and the other, married and of a higher status. This work by Solomon emphasizes the loneliness of a governess' predicament.

== Gallery ==
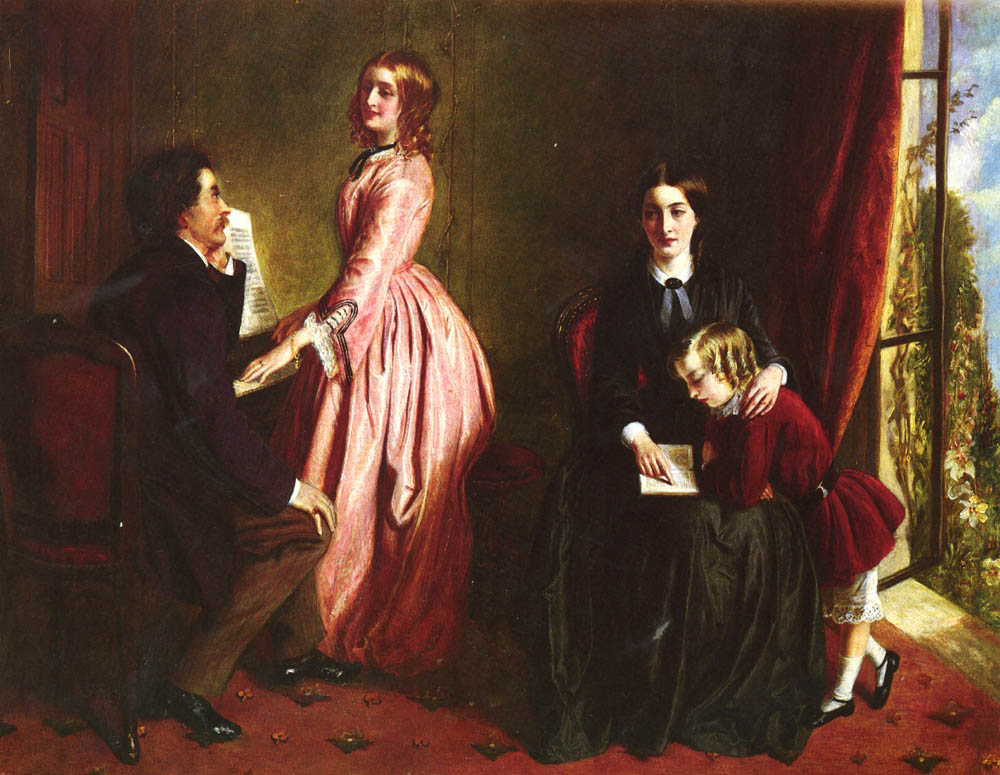
The Governess

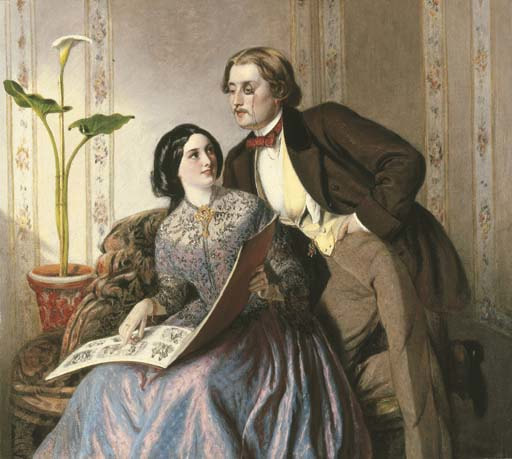
A Fashionable Couple

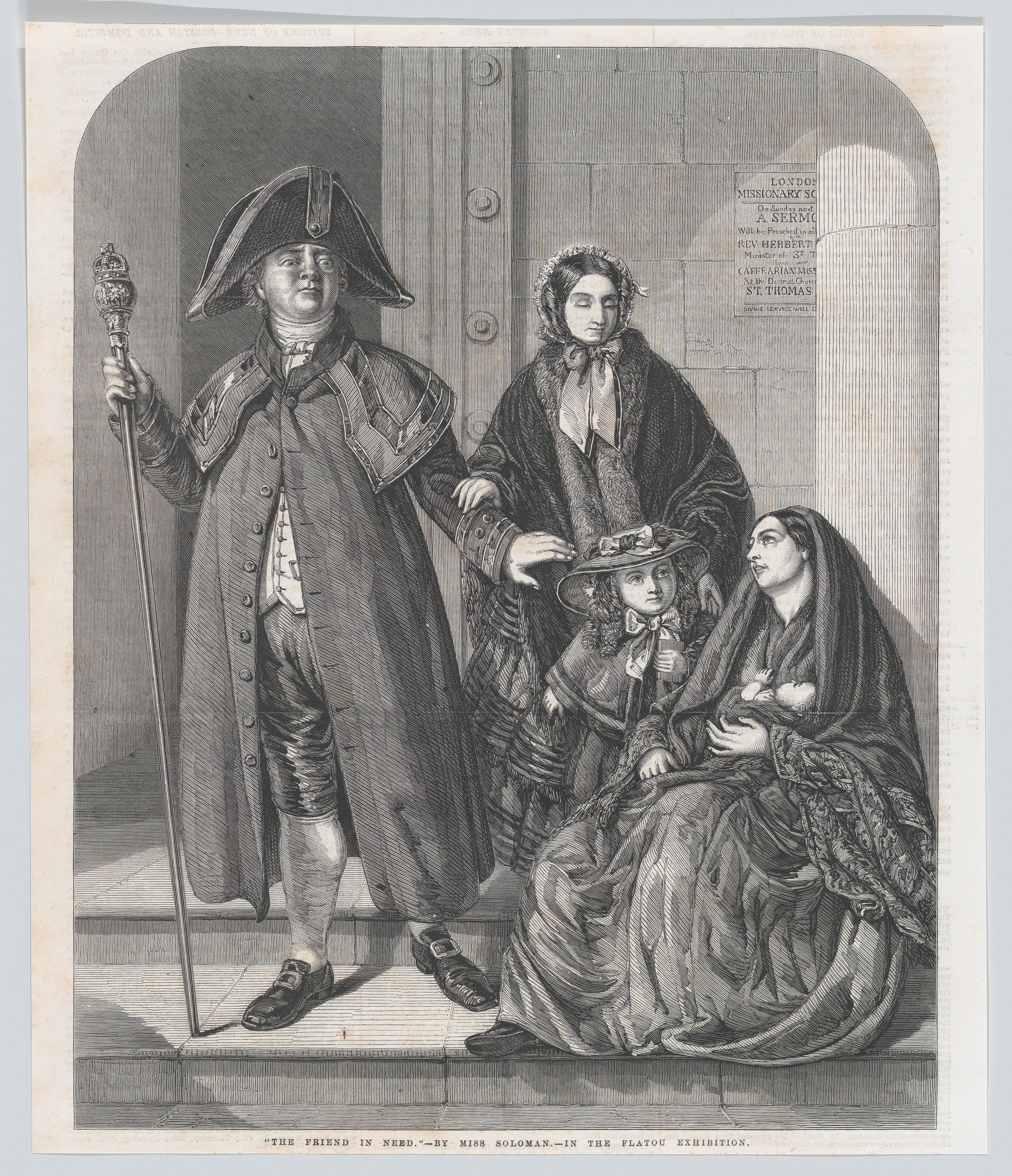
The Friend in Need

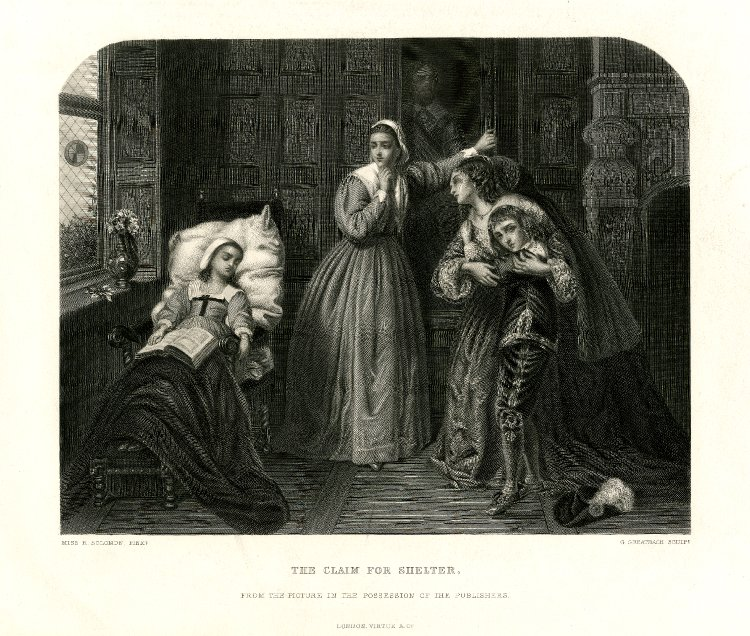
The Claim for Shelter

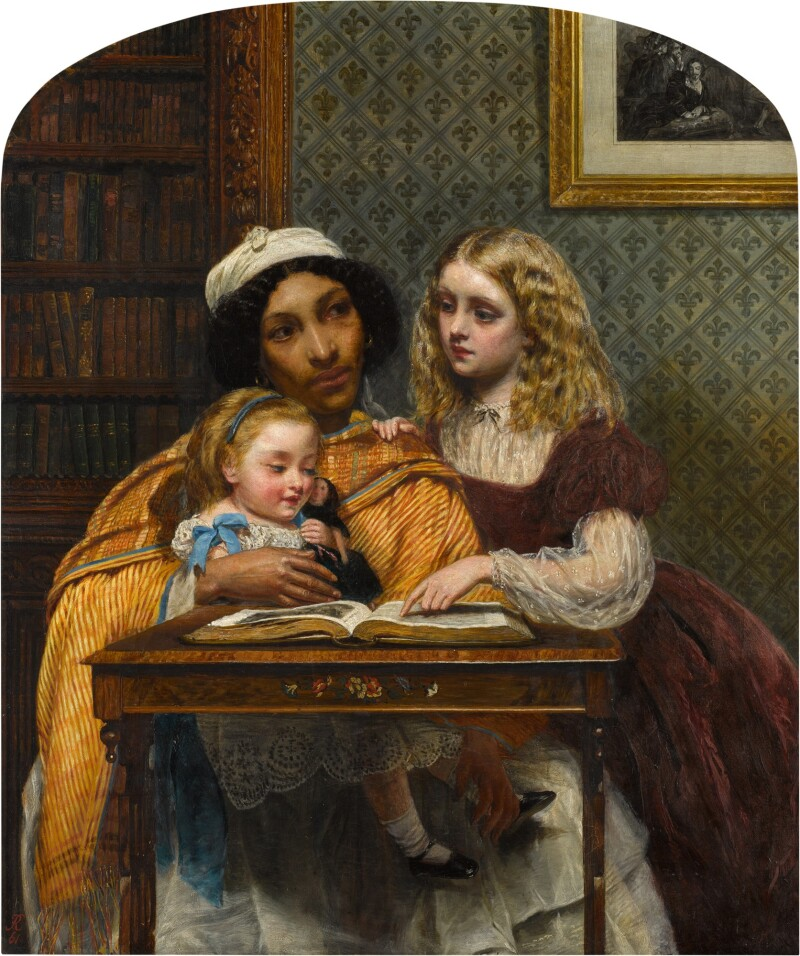
A Young Teacher

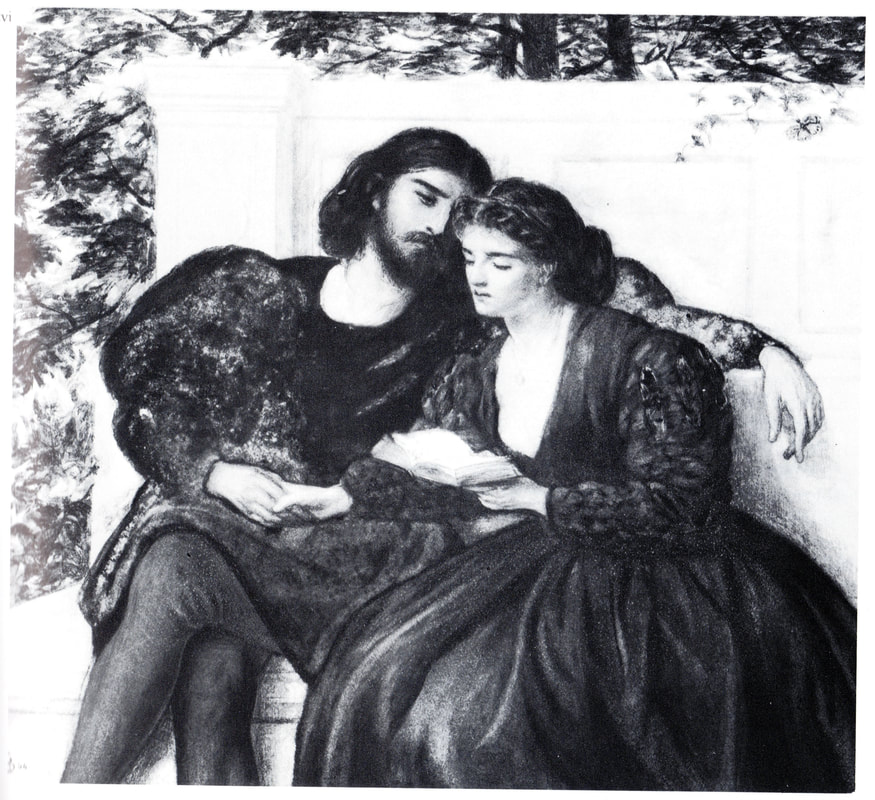
Primavera

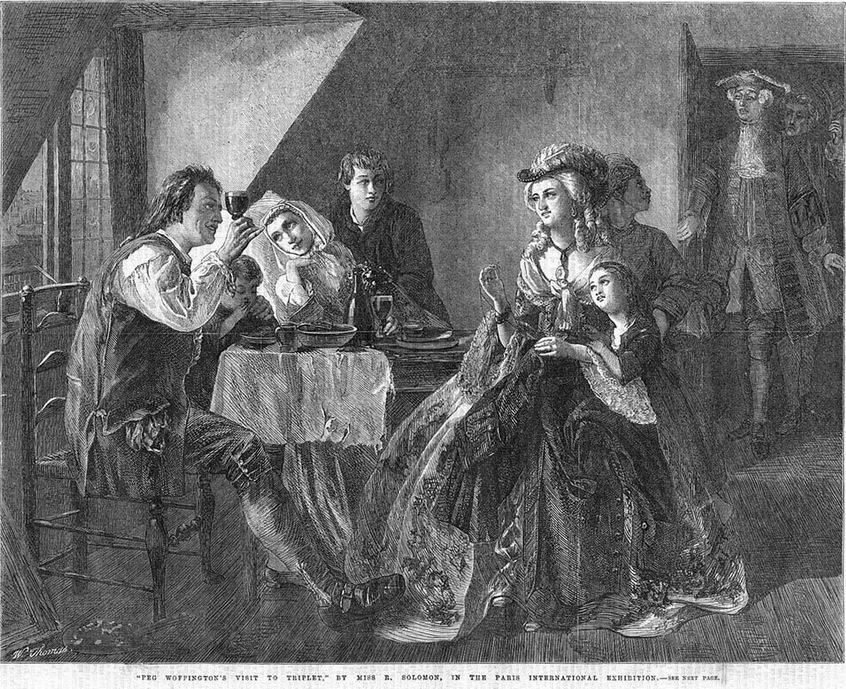
Peg Woffington's Visit to Triplet

Solomon's artworks were exhibited in numerous venues in England from 1850 through 1885. Venues featuring her work included the Royal Academy of Arts, the British Institution, the Royal Society of British Artists, the Royal Institution, Gambart's French Gallery, the Dudley Gallery, and the Liverpool Society of Fine Arts. Her painting Peg Woffington's Visit to Triplet also appeared in the 1867 Exposition Universelle in Paris.

At the Royal Academy's annual Summer Exhibition, Solomon exhibited almost annually between 1852 and 1869.

Her paintings at the Royal Academy were

- A. Solomon, Esq. (1852, no. 1055)
- The Governess (1854, no. 425)
- The Story of Balaclava (1855, no. 1360)
- A Friend in Need (1856, no. 511)
- Tis better to be lowly born, etc. (1857, no. 27)
- Behind the Curtain (1858, no. 1094)
- Love's Labour Lost (1859, no. 548)
- Peg Woffington's Visit to Triplet (1860, no. 269)
- The Arrest of a Deserter (1861, no. 581; now at the Israel Museum, Jerusalem)
- Fugitive Royalists (1862, no. 432; also exhibited at the Dudley Gallery, London in 1866–67)
- Good Night (1863, no. 668)
- Henry Esmond's Welcome at Walcote (1864, no. 502; also titled Beatrix Welcoming Henry Esmond to Walcote)
- The Lion and the Mouse (1865, nos. 459 and 479)
- Heloise (1867, no. 150)
- Giovannina--Roma (1867, no. 484)
- Helena and Hermia (1869, no. 785)
- A Bit of Old London was exhibited posthumously, in 1903 (no. 827)

== See also ==
English women painters from the 19th century who exhibited at the Royal Academy of Arts

- Sophie Gengembre Anderson
- Mary Baker
- Ann Charlotte Bartholomew
- Maria Bell
- Barbara Bodichon
- Joanna Mary Boyce
- Margaret Sarah Carpenter
- Fanny Corbaux
- Rosa Corder
- Mary Ellen Edwards
- Harriet Gouldsmith
- Mary Harrison (artist)
- Jane Benham Hay
- Anna Mary Howitt
- Mary Moser
- Martha Darley Mutrie
- Ann Mary Newton
- Emily Mary Osborn
- Kate Perugini
- Louise Rayner
- Ellen Sharples
- Rolinda Sharples

== Bibliography ==
- Marsh, Jan and Pamela Gerrish Nunn. Pre-Raphaelite Women Artists. New York: Thames & Hudson, 1999.
- Ferrari, Roberto C. “Rebecca Solomon, Pre-Raphaelite Sister.” The Review of the Pre-Raphaelite Society, 12:2 (Summer 2004): 23–36.
- Daniels, Jeffery. "Solomon : a family of painters : Abraham Solomon, 1823–1862, Rebecca Solomon, 1832–1886, Simeon Solomon, 1840–1905" London: Inner Education Authority, 1985.
- Nunn, Pamela Gerrish. "Rebecca Solomon's 'A Young Teacher'" The Burlington Magazine Vol. 130, No. 1027 (Oct. 1988), pp. 769–770
- Harris, Elree I., and Shirley R. Scott. A Gallery of Her Own: An Annotated Bibliography of Women in Victorian Painting. London: Routledge, 1997.
- Hill, Kate. Women and Museums 1850–1914: Modernity and the Gendering of Knowledge. 1st ed., Manchester University Press, 2016
- Casteras, Susan P. The Art Bulletin: Reviewed Works, vol. 80, no. 4, 1998, pp. 750–752. JSTOR, www.jstor.org/stable/3051324. Accessed 25 Mar. 2020.
- “Rebecca Solomon Biography.” Simeon Solomon Research Archive, www.simeonsolomon.com/rebecca-solomon-biography.html.
- Round, Alex. "Rebecca Solomon as a Social Activist", The Victorian Web, https://victorianweb.org/painting/solomonr/round.html
