= George Henry Harrison =

English painter

George Henry Harrison (1816–1846) was an English water-colour painter.

== Life ==
Born in Liverpool, he was the second son of Mary Harrison, the flower-painter. He went to London aged 14, and worked for dealers. Subsequently he made anatomical and other medical drawings and illustrations, and studied anatomy at the Hunterian school in Windmill Street. He had much support from John Constable, who advised him to observe nature closely.

In 1840 Harrison first exhibited at the Royal Academy, and in 1845 he was elected an associate of the Old Water-Colour Society in Pall Mall. Illness forced him to travel in search of health. In Paris, as he had done in and around London, he formed classes for out-of-door sketching.

Harrison died of aneurysm on 20 October 1846.

== Works ==
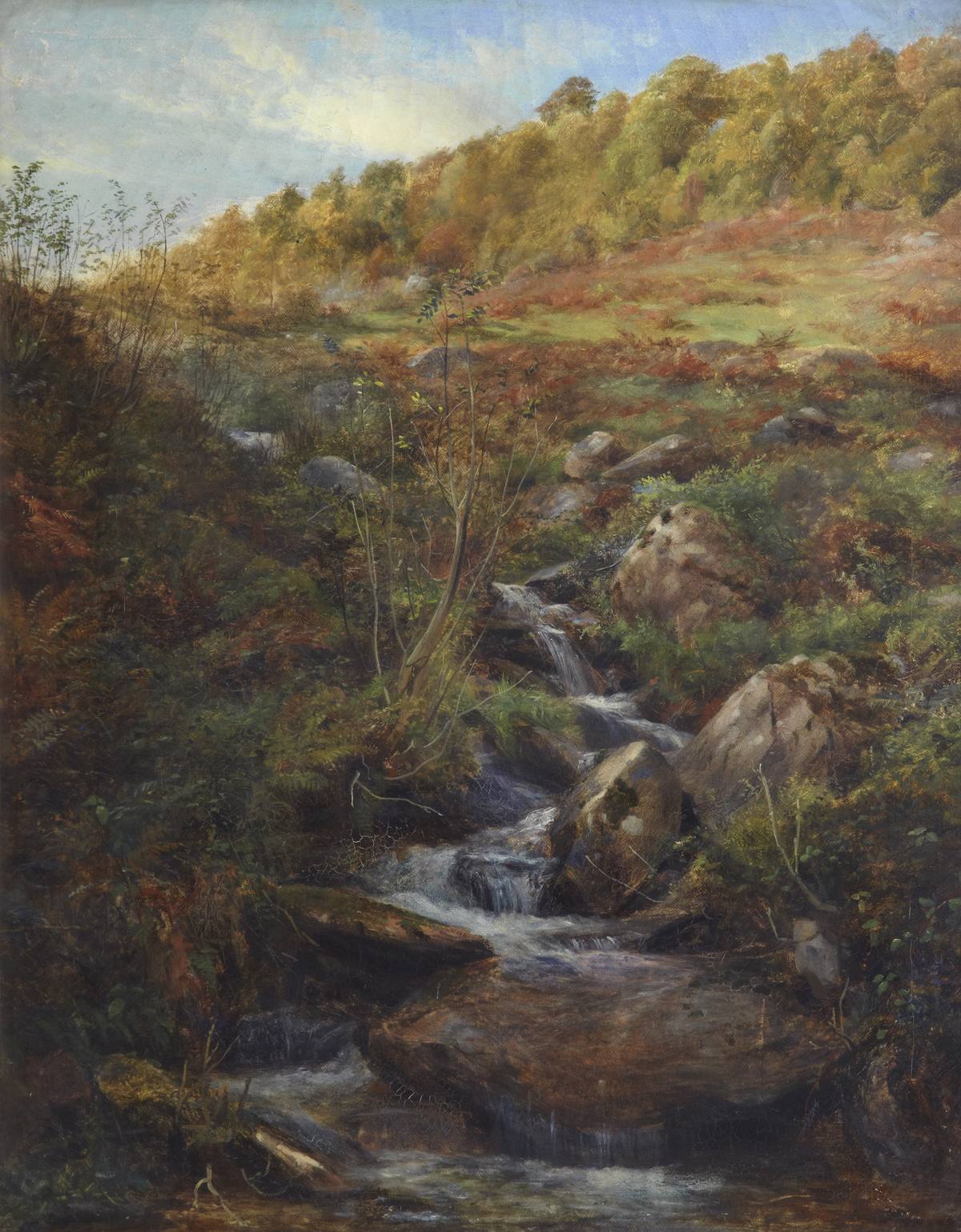
The Brook by George Henry Harrison

According to Algernon Graves, Harrison exhibited 27 pictures between 1840 and 1846, 14 at the Royal Academy, two at the British Institution, and 11 at the Suffolk Street Gallery. He concentrated on landscapes and domestic scenes, with the influence of Watteau and Boucher in some works. He seldom worked in oil. He made drawings of fancy ball scenes and other festivities at Buckingham Palace for the Illustrated London News. Sketches "Fontainebleau" and "St. Cloud" from the last year of his life show his style of luxurious landscape.
