= Henrietta Ward =

English painter

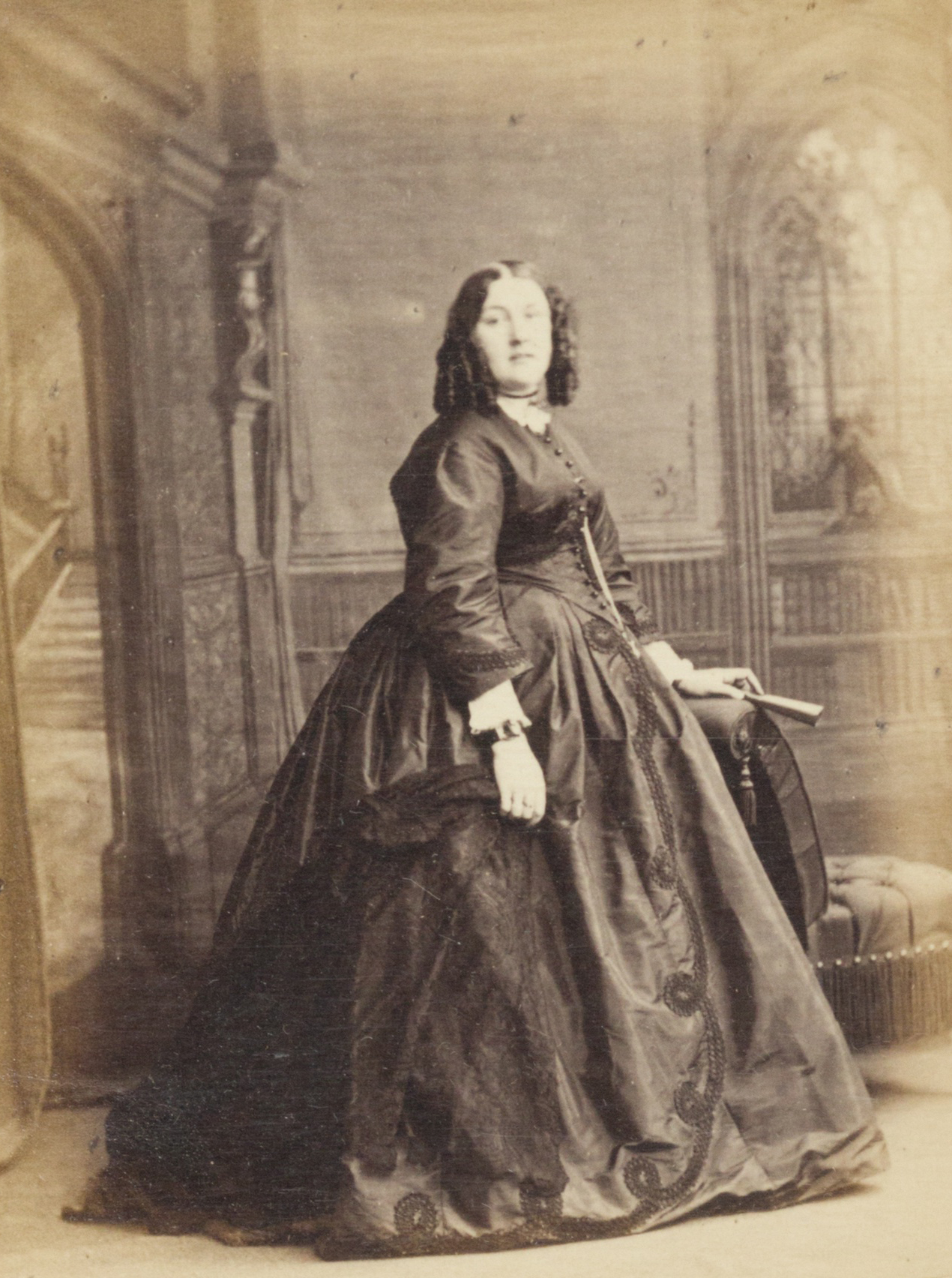
- Portrait of Henrietta Ward, c. 1863, by Ernest Edwards
- Born: Henrietta Mary Ada Ward; 1 June 1832; London, United Kingdom of Great Britain and Ireland
- Died: 12 July 1924 (aged 92); Slough, United Kingdom
- Known for: Painting
- Spouse: Edward Matthew Ward (m. 1848; died 1879)
- Children: 8, including Leslie
- Relatives: James Ward (grandfather)

Henrietta Mary Ada Ward (née Ward; 1 June 1832 – 12 July 1924) was a British historical and genre painter of the Victorian era and the early twentieth century.

== Life and work ==
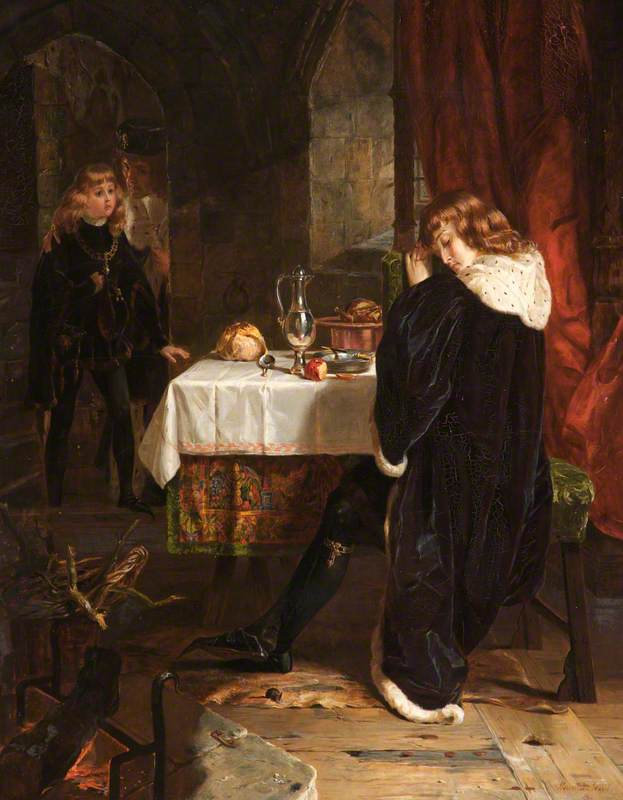
The Princes in the Tower

Ward belonged to a family that produced professional artists over several generations. Her paternal grandfather was the prominent animal painter James Ward, who was related by marriage to fellow artists John Jackson and George Morland. Her parents were also artists: George Raphael Ward was best known for his printmaking, Mary Webb Ward for her miniatures. (One of her mother's pictures was Portrait of Henrietta Ward and her Favorite Guinea Pig, 1843.) An only child, the young Henrietta grew up surrounded by and familiar with her parents' artist acquaintances, including Sir Edwin Landseer, C. R. Leslie, and the brothers John James and Alfred Edward Chalon. She studied her craft at the Bloomsbury Art School and the academy started by Henry Sass.

In 1843, when she was 11 years old, Henrietta fell in love with the 27-year-old historical painter Edward Matthew Ward (no relation); they married secretly in May 1848, aided by the groom's friend Wilkie Collins — so that her maiden and married names were the same. (Traditional sources occasionally refer to her as "Henrietta Mary Ada Ward Ward.") Henrietta's mother never forgave the elopement, and disinherited her.

(Collins may have based the plot of his 1852 novel Basil on the Ward engagement. In turn, Henrietta claimed to have given Collins the idea for The Woman in White.)

Edward and Henrietta Ward had eight children, one of whom would be Leslie Ward, the caricaturist and cartoonist known as "Spy." While raising her brood, Henrietta pursued her own artistic career; she worked in various genres, though she, like her husband, was noted for her historical pictures, on subjects like Thomas Chatterton and Elizabeth Fry. She was also noted for her pictures of children; she used her own children as models for her paintings.

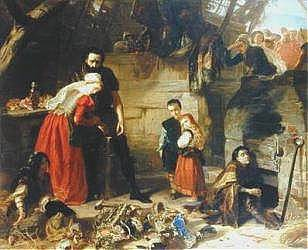
Palissy the Potter

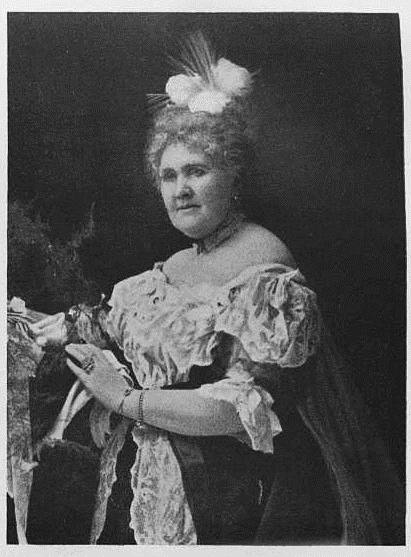
Ward in 1909

One of her most famous paintings was Palissy the Potter, displayed at the Royal Academy in 1866; it illustrates the incident in which Bernard Palissy accidentally blew up his house while experimenting on ceramic techniques. This and similar works (like Queen Mary quitting Stirling Castle; RA 1863 and Scene from the childhood of Joan of Arc; RA 1867) made her perhaps the most prominent female history painter of her generation. She gave art lessons to several of the royal children of Queen Victoria and Prince Albert.

n April 1859, 38 female artists, including Henrietta Ward, sent a letter/petition to the Royal Academy Academicians requesting entry for women, which was initially rejected. This petition was published in The Athenæum on the 30th of April. Both Henrietta Ward and her husband were supporters of the cause of women's suffrage. The Wards traveled in an artistic circle that included figures like Charles Dickens and George Cruikshank. In one account, Dickens and Cruikshank nearly brawled when the teetotaler Cruikshank prevented Henrietta Ward from drinking a glass of sherry at a Dickens party.

She outlived her husband by forty-five years. After his 1879 death, the widow started her own art school to help support her family; like her contemporary Louise Jopling, Henrietta Ward specialized in training young women artists. She also received a pension of £100 for her previous service as a royal teacher. Ward exhibited her work at the Palace of Fine Arts at the 1893 World's Columbian Exposition in Chicago, Illinois.

Ward published two autobiographical memoirs, Mrs. E. M. Ward’s Reminiscences in 1911 and Memories of Ninety Years, in the year of her death. Her first book has been called "one of the best accounts of the life of a Victorian lady artist."

== Works ==
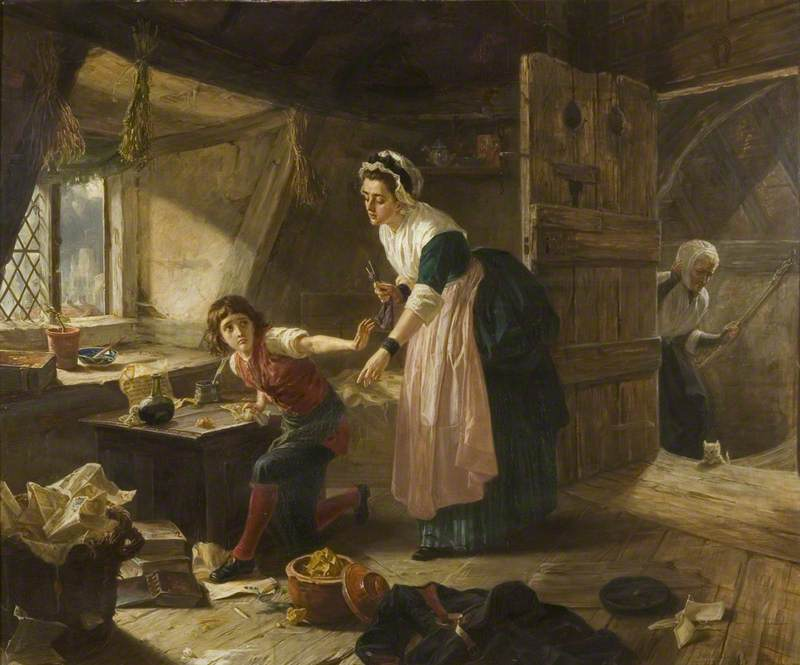
Chatterton or, the Secret Message

- The Market at Antwerp
- At the Louvre, 1649 (1862)
- Queen Mary Quitting Stirling Castle (1863)
- The Princes in the Tower (1864; Rochdale Art Gallery)
- Palissy the Potter (1866; Leicester Museum and Art Gallery)
- Scene from the Childhood of Joan of Arc (1867; Untraced)
- The Crown of the Feast (1868)
- Little Beatrice in the Arbour
- The Queens Lodge, Windsor, in 1786 (c.1872; Walker Art Gallery, Liverpool)
- Chatterton, 1765 (c.1873; Bristol Museum and Art Gallery)
- Princess Charlotte of Wales (1877)
- Shut Out (1891)
- Peace and Plenty (1896)
