= Mary Moser =

English painter

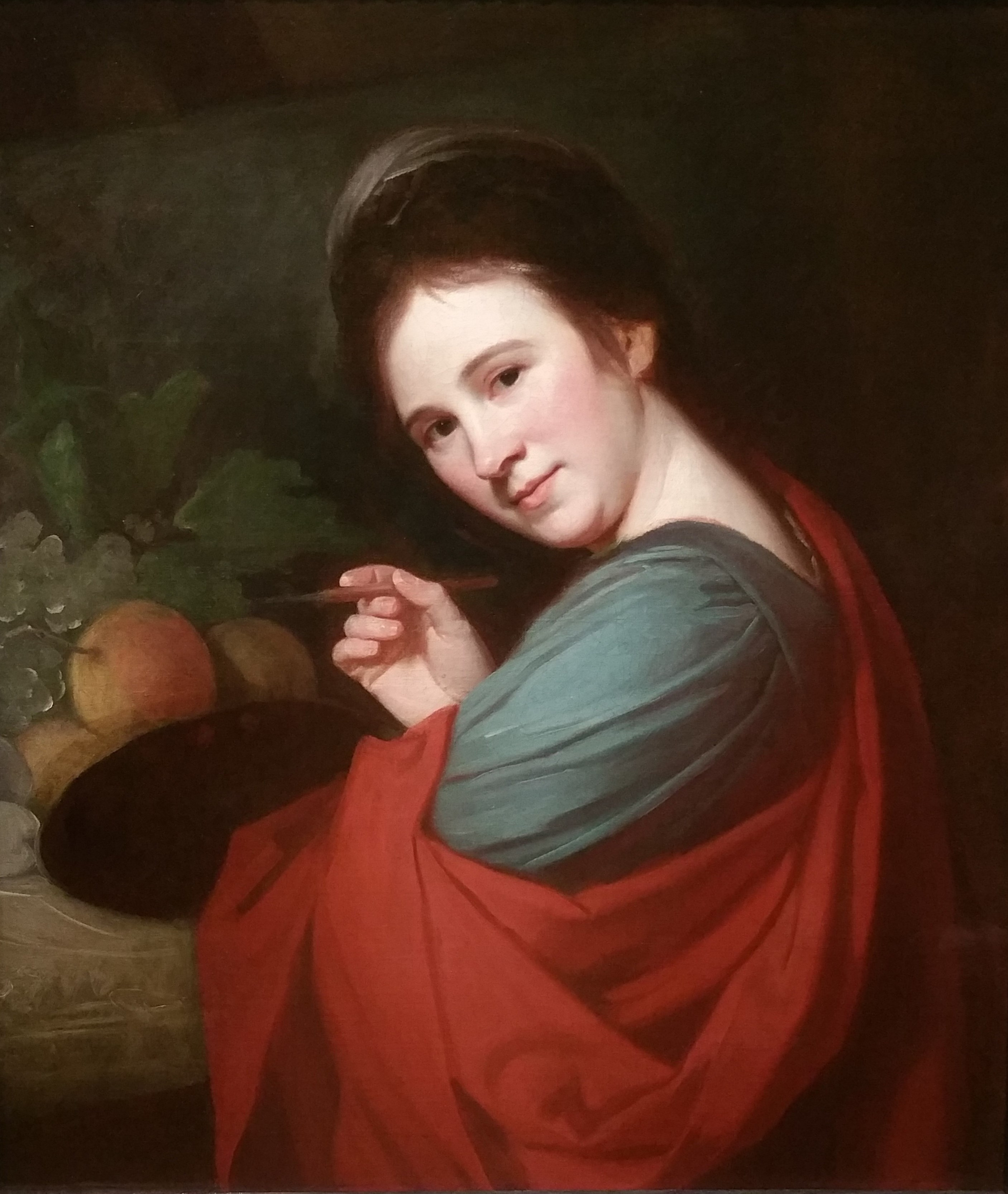
- Portrait by George Romney
- Born: 27 October 1744; London, England
- Died: 2 May 1819 (aged 74); London, England
- Spouse: Hugh Lloyd
- Patrons: Queen Charlotte

Mary Moser RA (27 October 1744 – 2 May 1819) was an English painter who was one of the most celebrated female artists in 18th-century Britain. One of only two female founding members of the Royal Academy in 1768 (along with Angelica Kauffman), Moser painted portraits but is particularly noted for her depictions of flowers.

== Life and career ==
London-born Moser was trained by her Swiss-born artist and enameller father George Michael Moser (1706–1783), George III's own drawing master. Her talents were evident at an early age: she won her first Society of Arts medal at 14, and regularly exhibited flower pieces, and occasional history paintings, at the Society of Artists of Great Britain. Ten years later, however, her thirst for professional recognition led her to join with 35 other artists (including her father) in forming the Royal Academy, and, with Angelica Kauffman, she took an active role in proceedings.

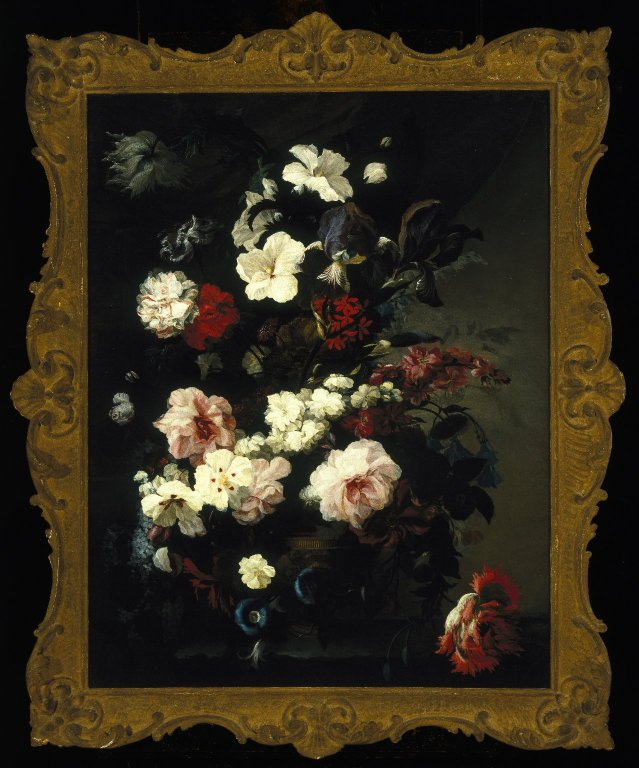
Brooklyn Museum – Flowers Still Life (Jardinière of Flowers) – Mary Moser

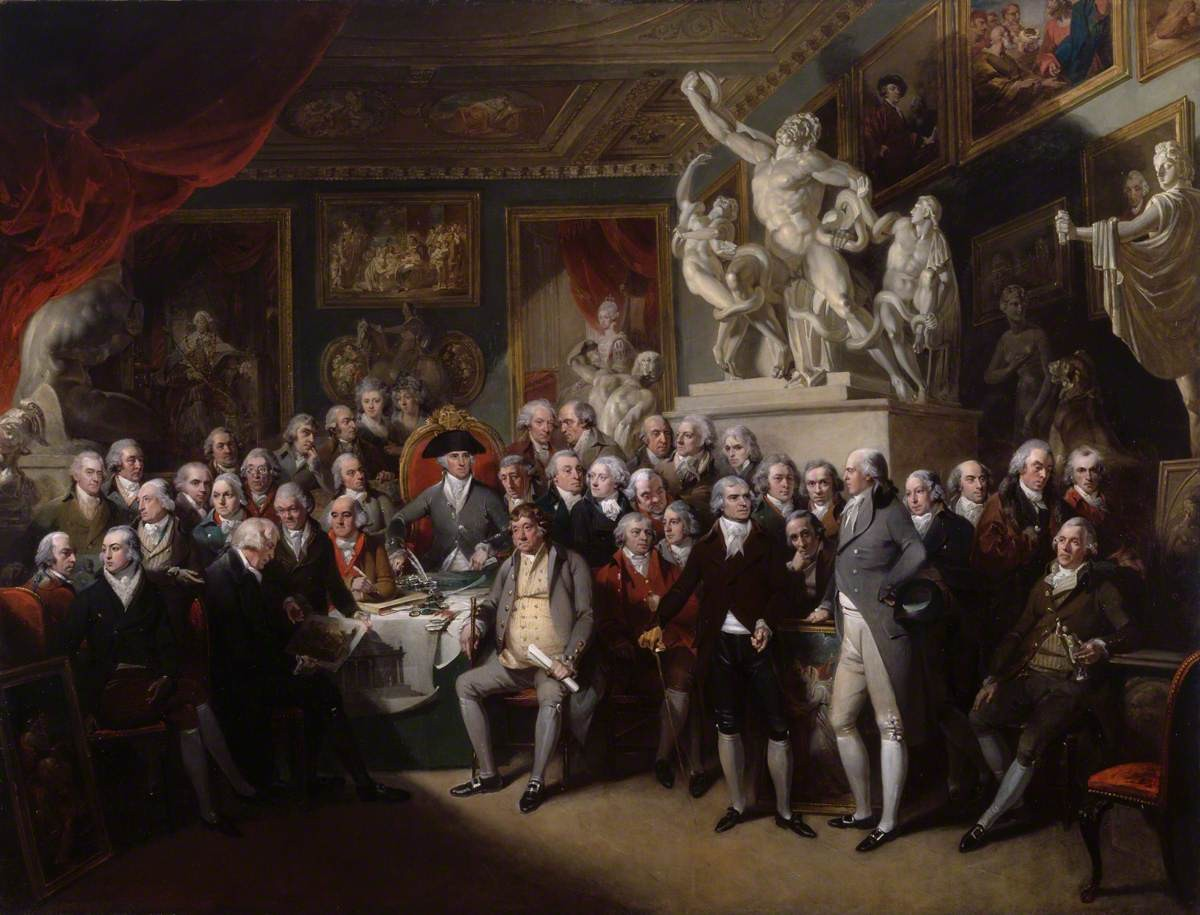
The Royal Academicians in General Assembly by Henry Singleton, 1795. Moser and Angelica Kauffman are next to each other at the rear of the group.

In a group portrait by Johan Zoffany, The Academicians of the Royal Academy (1771–72; Royal Collection, London), members are shown gathered around a nude male model at a time when women were excluded from such training in order to protect their modesty. So that Moser and Kauffman could be included, Zoffany added them as portraits hanging on the wall. They were both later included in the 1795 group painting The Royal Academicians in General Assembly by Henry Singleton.

George Romney (c. 1770) painted a portrait of Moser at work on a still life which was acquired by the National Portrait Gallery, London in 2003.

Her influences include the older Dutch masters, famed for glowing color against dark backgrounds. From the beginning, her approach was "bold and luxurious," writes Germaine Greer.

In the 1790s, Moser received a prestigious commission, for which she was paid over £900, from Queen Charlotte to complete a floral decorative scheme for a room in Frogmore House in Windsor, Berkshire. This was to prove one of her last professional works. At 53, she married Captain Hugh Lloyd, the widower of a friend on 23 October 1793. She retired and began exhibiting as an amateur under her married name. She continued showing at the Royal Academy until 1802.

At this period Moser had a brief affair with artist Richard Cosway, who was then separated from his wife Maria Cosway, an Anglo-Italian artist. Moser travelled with him for six months on a sketching tour in 1793.

"One of the most celebrated women artists of 18th-century Britain," Moser died in Upper Thornhaugh Street, London, on 2 May 1819, and was buried, alongside her husband in Kensington Cemetery.

Moser's pieces in the British Royal Collection show that she was not only "the first significant British flower painter, she was also one of the best." Her portrait of famed British sculptor Joseph Nollekens hangs in the Yale Center for British Art.

== Legacy ==
No further women were elected as full members of the academy until Dame Laura Knight in 1936.
