= Emily Mary Osborn =

English painter (1828–1925)

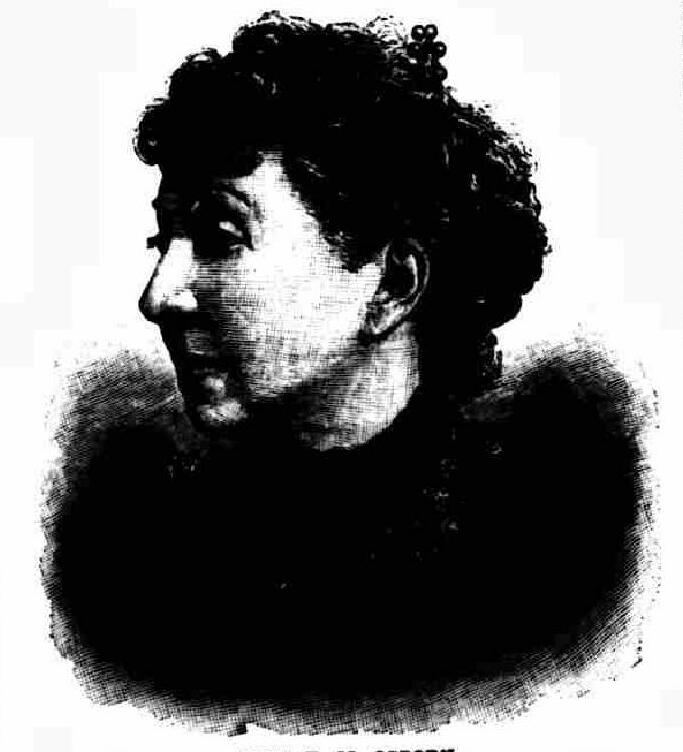
- Osborn in an 1880 publication
- Born: 11 February 1828; Kentish Town, London
- Died: 25 April 1925 (aged 97); St John's Wood, London
- Notable work: Nameless and Friendless (1857)
- Spouse: None

Emily Mary Osborn (1828–1925), or Osborne, was an English painter of the Victorian era. She is known for her pictures of children and her genre paintings, especially on themes of women in distress.

== Biography ==
Emily Osborn was born in Kentish Town in London, on 11 February 1828, the eldest of nine children of the Rev. Edward Osborn (1792–1859) and his wife Mary (née Bolland, 1806–1868). Osborn took up the curacy of West Tilbury under its rector Edward Linzee during the spring of 1834, when Emily was about five. The family occupied the parsonage at the top of Gun Hill, which is pictured in a lithograph of 1845 by D. Walton. Osborn lived for some eight years at the parsonage, though she afterwards recalled that her "early surroundings ... were not such as to develope artistic proclivities, there being but little natural beauty in the country around West Tilbury ...". There, her mother encouraged her "and watched with pride the clever portraits Emily drew of her brothers and sisters". The parent herself possessed a great love of painting and had, on her own account, "wished in vain to study Art professionally". The same article speaks of experimentation at this period, how the teenage girl, not always being able to obtain the paints she desired "devised a plan of making an extra supply of colours from flowers, by putting the petals into bottles with a little spirits of wine".

Her father's final entry in the parish registers of St. James', was on 2 November 1842, after which the family removed to London – "to the great delight of his eldest girl, who rightly considered there was now some chance of realising the hopes she entertained of one day becoming an artist". Thereafter she attended evening classes at the Dickenson academy in Maddox Street, where she was taught by John Mogford. After a period of three months, her father wanted her to stop lessons, presumably for financial reasons, but one of the masters, J.M. Leigh offered to teach her privately with another student. And so, she then studied privately under J.M. Leigh from Maddox Street, and later at his academy in Newman Street for a year. In 1851, at the age of seventeen, Osborn began showing her work in the annual Royal Academy exhibition, and continued to do so over a span of four decades until 1893.

In 1868, Osborn lost her mother "and for two years did no work of importance", then for six months she and her sister devoted themselves to nursing the sick and wounded in the Franco-Prussian War. "Then came her visits to Venice and Algeria, made familiar (to gallery-goers) by her pictures in the Grosvenor and elsewhere". At home, she also toured and painted among the Norfolk Broads.

Osborn never married and died aged 97 on 14 April 1925 in the home she had shared for many years with Mary Elizabeth Dunn, 10A Cunningham Place, St John's Wood, London.

== Work and reception ==
Osborn first exhibited work at the Royal Academy in 1851 with two paintings: The Letter (a genre painting) and a portrait of Benjamin Goode. Over the next three years she sent four poetical and literary paintings to exhibitions. Three of the paintings were illustrations based on works by Tennyson, Byron, and Collins while one painting was a mood painting titled Evening. In 1855, Osborn was paid 200 guineas for painting a group of life-sized portraits for a Mrs. Sturgis and her children and she also gained acclaim in the same year when her work My Cottage Door was purchased by the Queen. This acclaim and money allowed her to acquire a studio in 1856 and the following year in 1857, she displayed her most famous and acclaimed work, Nameless and Friendless, at the Royal Academy. From 1860 to 1870 Osborn enjoyed great success and critical acclaim. She started the decade off by having another one of her works, The Governess bought by the Queen and The Escape of Lord Nithisdale from the Tower, 1716 brought her more critical praise.

In 1861, Osborn traveled to Munich to study and all four of her exhibits at the Royal Academy in 1862 were German themed. Later, in 1862, Tough and Tender was awarded a medal by the Society of Arts. Osborn won another award for her work Half the World Knows Not How the Other Half Lives, which was displayed at the Crystal Palace in 1864. The piece was awarded 60 guineas for being the "Best Historical or Figure Subject in Oil by a British Artist."

Between 1868 and 1870, Osborn is believed to have returned to Germany and in 1870 she sent Lost to the Royal Academy from Munich to be displayed. This was one of her last critically acclaimed works as Osborn fell out of popularity and critical factor in the 1870s. In 1873 she exhibited her first flower piece and through the 1870s she divided her time between her studio in London and her studio in Glasgow.

While Osborn continued to exhibit works at many galleries in the 1880s, none were as well received as her earlier works. In 1884 she made her first portrait in years of Mme Bodichon. Osborn exhibited her work at the Palace of Fine Arts and The Woman's Building at the 1893 World's Columbian Exposition in Chicago, Illinois. From the late 1880s to 1908, her works mainly consisted of landscapes.

== Themes ==
Like other female artists of her time, she focused on literary works for inspiration as it was common for literary paintings to be vehicles female artists used to display their skill and obtain other work such as portraits and landscapes. However, distinguishing her from other female artists who created literary paintings, Osborn's typically were more complex and featured multiple figures to display her ability. For a period of time, her works also focused on the contrast between youth and age, like in Tough and Tender (1862) and Sunday Morning, Betzingen, Wurtemburg (1863). However, her work that got the most acclaim was her work that seemed to have a moralizing aspect. Osborn specialized in emotive scenes and often her subjects were young women and children. Her work was seen to have a moral or educational aspect and had a sense of truth and representation of the real world and subjects they depicted. For example, The Governess (1860), For the Last Time (1864), and Half The World Knows Not How the Other Half Lives (1864) were all three seen as conveying valuable moral lessons.

There was also a body of literature and painting focused on middle-class women who had to earn money. These works were often inspired by the middle-class women who wrote and painted these subjects and Osborn's Nameless and Friendless (1857) also plays upon this theme.

== Nameless and Friendless ==
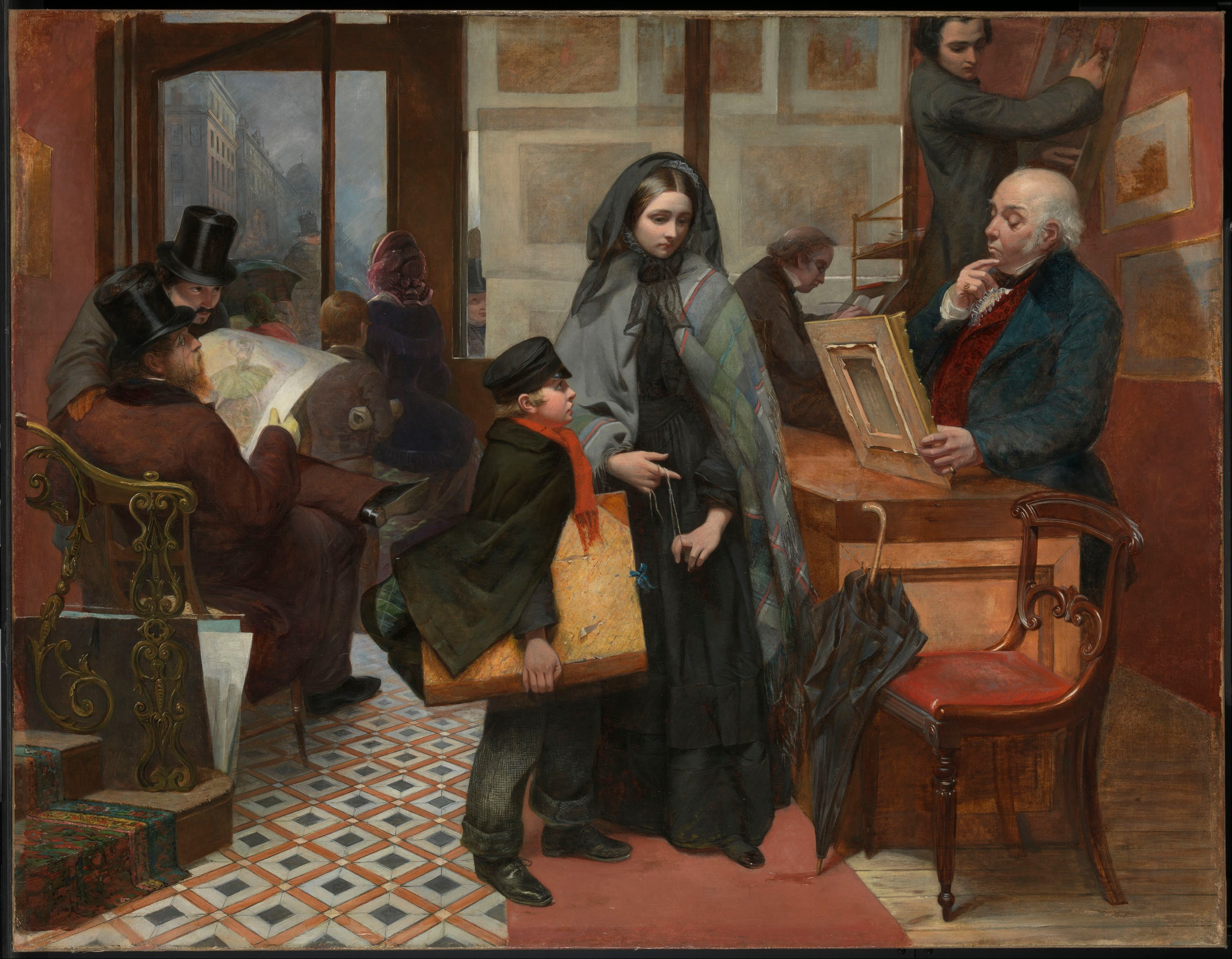
Nameless and Friendless (1857)

Osborn's most famous work is Nameless and Friendless (1857), which has been called "The most ingenious of all Victorian widow pictures." It depicts a recently bereaved woman attempting to make a living as an artist by offering a picture to a dealer, while two "swells" at the left ogle her. The creation of this piece was a product of its time. In the 1850s there was an influx of middle-class women into the urban environment of London. Women began more freely to occupy the streets and travel the city. They would walk the streets, take public transportation, etc. This opened up opportunities for women but also introduced new social dynamics and there were many debates about this new dynamic and way of urban life. Nameless and Friendless is one of the few publicly exhibited paintings by a woman to address these new urban dynamics during the 1850s. In Going Places: Women Artists in Central London in the Mid-Nineteenth Century, Deborah Cherry says that Nameless and Faceless is "concerned less with jostling crowds ... this is a painting about the ocular and corporeal encounters of the modern city and its sexual geographies of desire." Cherry notes how the picture plane is full of nuance in body language. The young lady is not active in the painting. The young woman is not only in the center of the picture plane, but also the center of attention of the other characters. The young woman is caught in the multiple gazes of the men around her. The setting appears to be the West End, where Cherry says "the legitimate and the obscene are on sale side-by-side". One of the seated male figures is holding a print with a scantily-clad dancer while the other man sitting next to him looks at the young woman in the center of the painting instead, indicating that the male gaze is sexual in nature and that in the urban landscape where women walk freely, they are still sexualized by the gazes of the men on the streets who can see them. Cherry says that "the gaze of the male customers – which possesses space and simultaneously captures image and body – signifies the hazards of sexual harassment for a respectable working woman in the highly charged and ambivalent spaces of modem London. And it returns us to the mutuality of bodies and space, ocularity and corporeality."

== Gallery ==
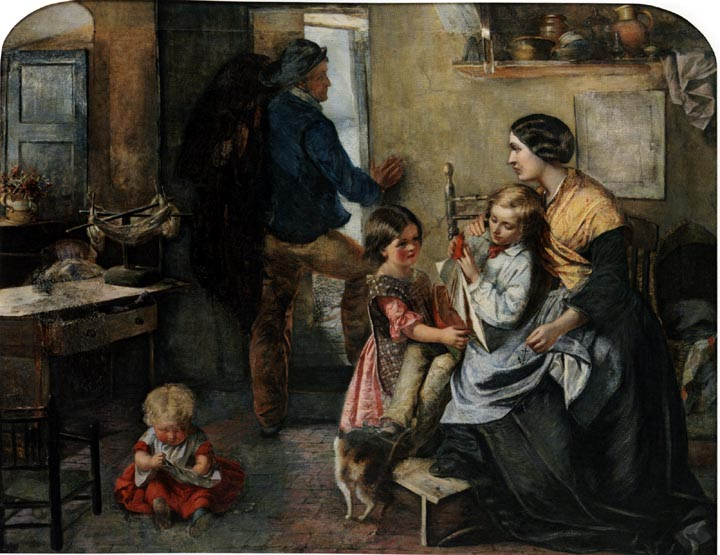
Presentiments (1859)

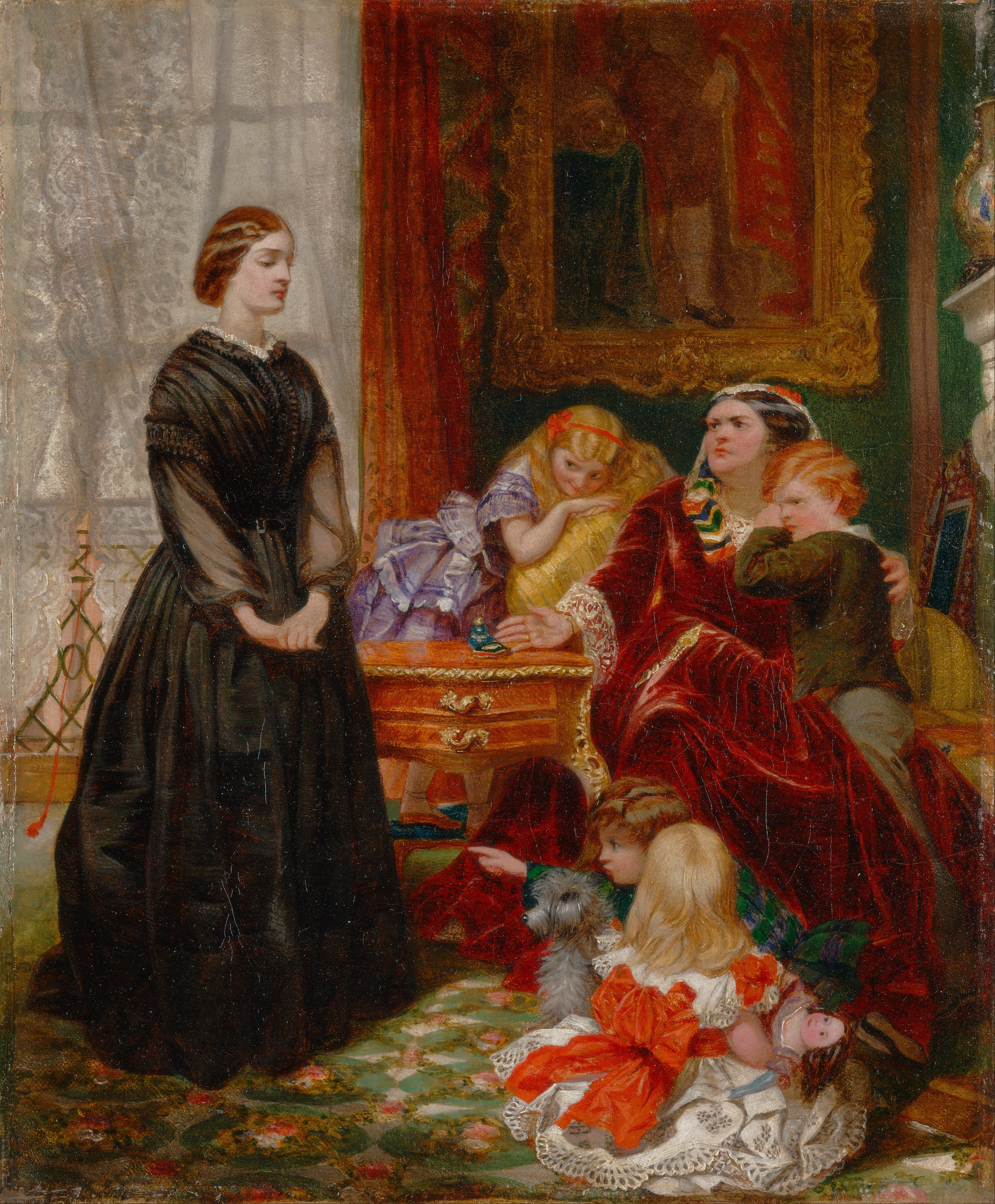
The Governess (1860)

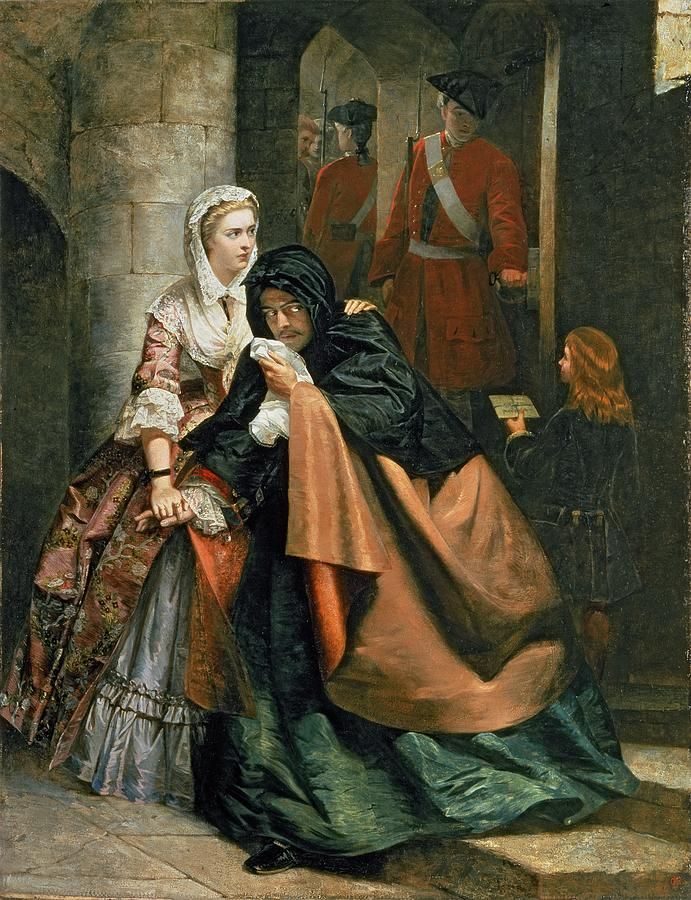
The Escape of Lord Nithisdale from the Tower, 1716 (1861)

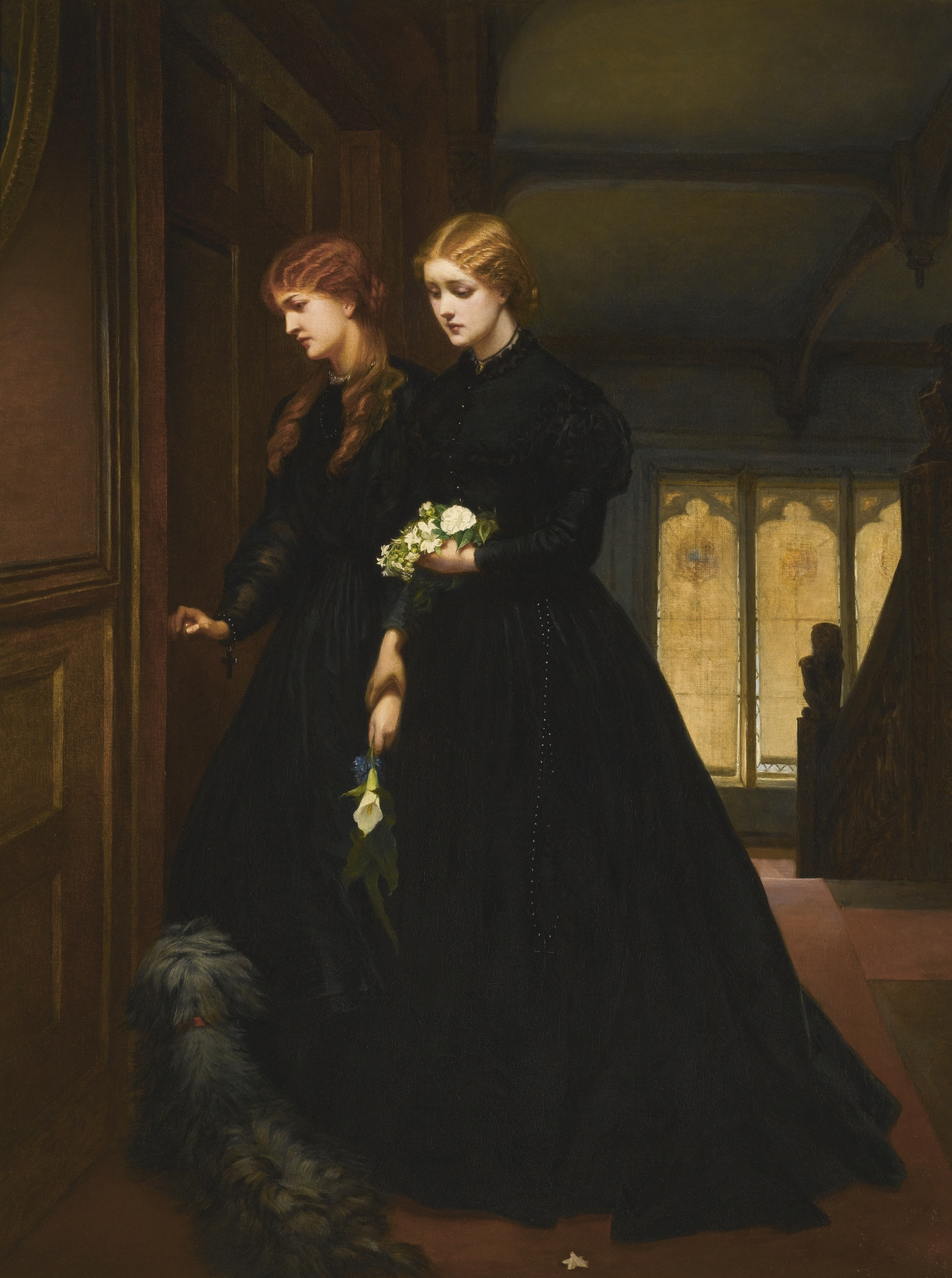
For the Last Time (1864)

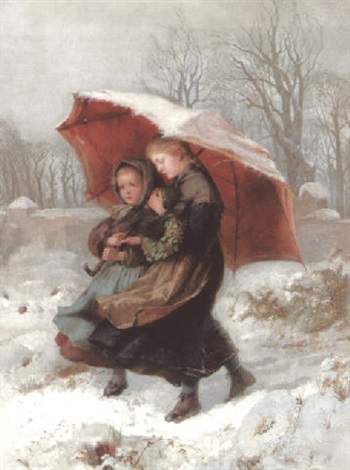
God's Acre (1866)

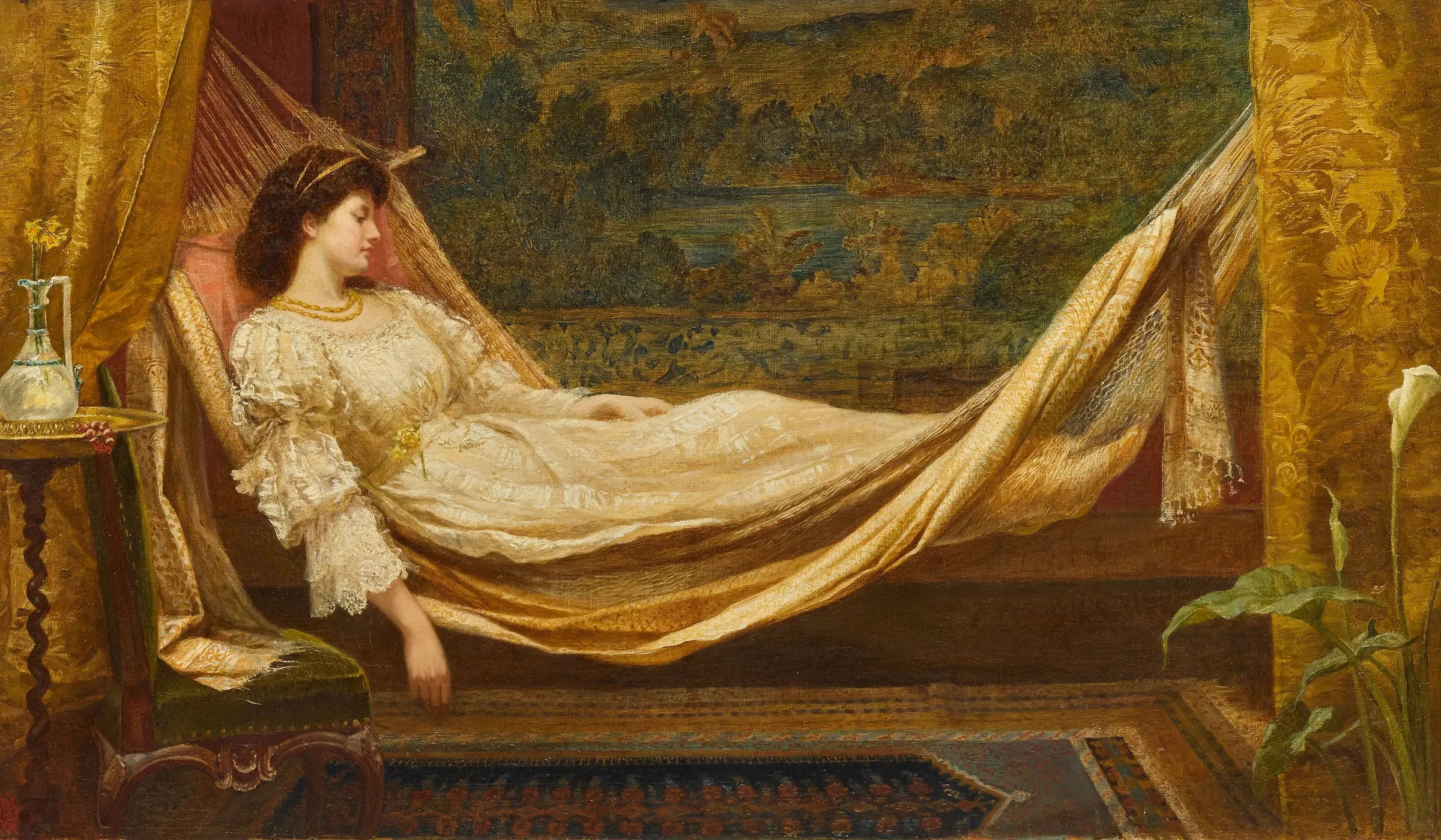
A Golden Daydream (1877)
