= Anastasios Tsamados =

Greek admiral

Admiral Anastasios Tsamados
- Αναστάσιος Τσαμαδός
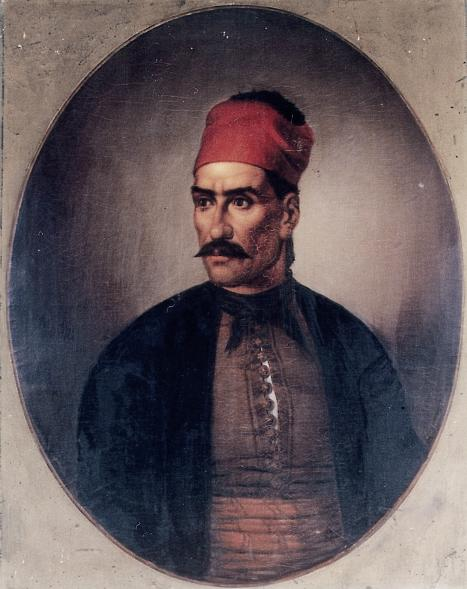
- A portrait of Anastasios Tsamados by Dionysios Tsokos
- Born: 1774; Hydra, Ottoman Empire (now Greece)
- Died: 1825 (aged 50–51); Sphacteria, First Hellenic Republic
- Military career
- Allegiance: (Greece) First Hellenic Republic
- Branch: Hellenic Navy
- Rank: Admiral (Posthumous)
- Commands: Aris
- Conflicts: Greek War of Independence: Battle of Patras; Chios Massacre; Battle of Sphacteria †

Anastasios Tsamados (Greek: Αναστάσιος Τσαμαδός; 1772 or 1774 – 1825) was a Greek admiral of the Greek War of Independence. He was the famous captain of the brig Aris and an admiral who led a naval squadron under Andreas Miaoulis. Anastasios Tsamados was the first to rush to the Greek island of Chios and attack the naval warships of the Kapudan Pasha during the massacre of Chios. He also fought in the naval battle of Patras (1822) and died heroically during the famous Battle of Sphacteria.

== Biography ==
Anastasios Tsamados was born on the island of Hydra in 1772 or 1774. Anastasios Tsamados came from the Arvanite community of Hydra, His family migrated from Kranidi around 1750. Upon the outbreak of the Greek Revolution in March 1821, he armed his ship Aris with 16 12-pounder guns and joined the fleet of his home island. He took part in many battles and operations of the Greek Revolution and soon became a famous captain. In April 1825, he went to Neokastron and consulted with the Minister of War Anagnostaras to help the fight against Ibrahim Pasha. In this last Battle of Sphacteria, Anastasios Tsamados died while fighting the powerful army of Ibrahim Pasha. Anastasios Tsamados courage, inter alios, inspired Jules Verne's epic adventure novel The Archipelago on Fire (French: L'Archipel en feu, 1884).

== Battle of Sphacteria ==
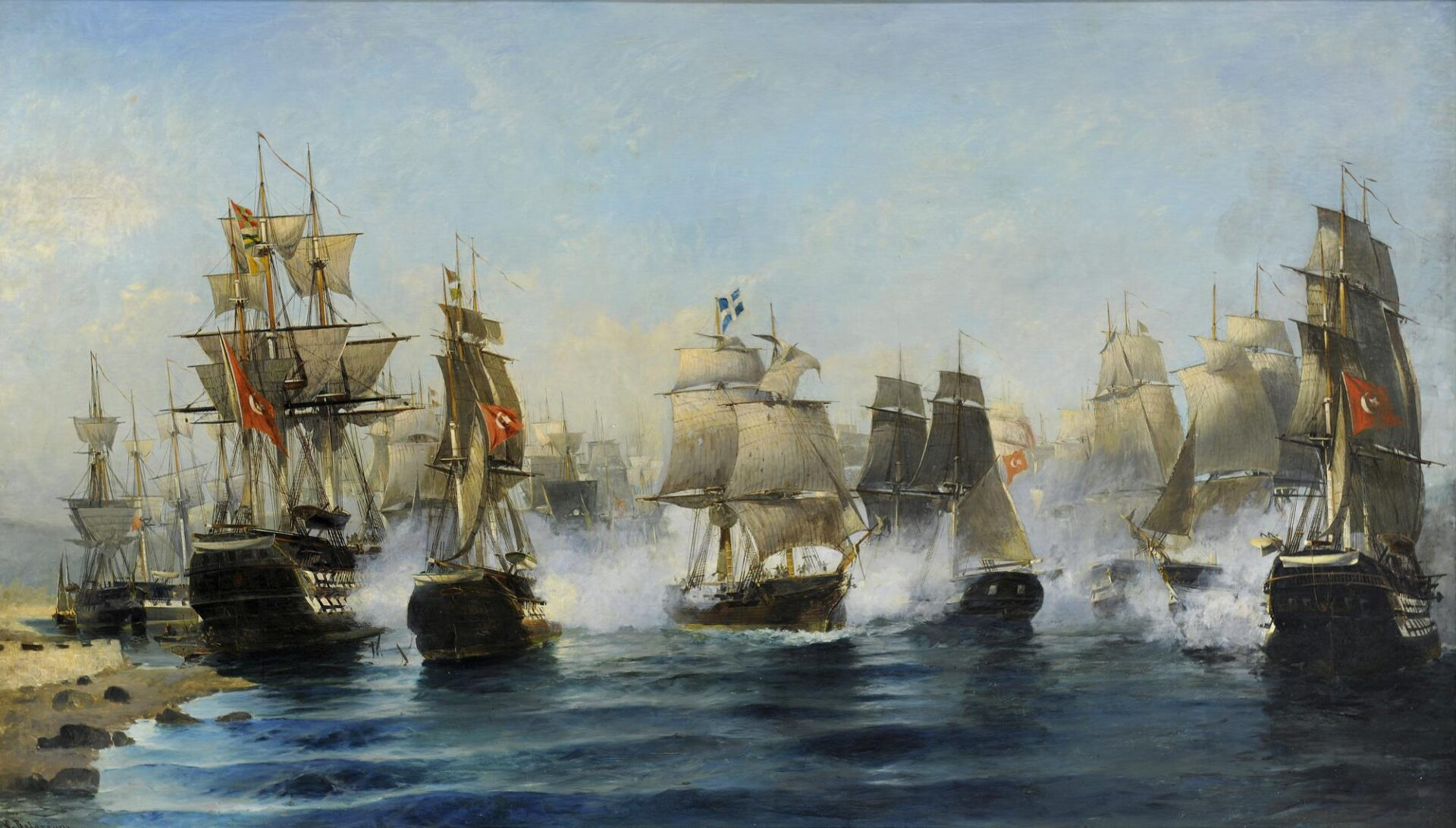
The ''Sortie of Aris'' during the Battle of Sphacteria.

At the start of the Greek War of Independence, a Greek garrison was quartered at the island of Sphacteria, which controlled the entrance of the excellent natural harbour of the Bay of Pylos (Navarino). Ibrahim Pasha of Egypt, tasked by the Ottoman sultan to suppress the Greek revolt, needed to take the island in order to use the bay for his own purposes. In May 1825, Ibrahim Pasha and a powerful army and navy of more than fifteen hundred Egyptians landed on the island of Sphacteria only to be met with resistance by Anastasios Tsamados and his gallant band of sailors and soldiers. Shot in the leg, admiral Tsamados continued fighting on his knees until he was killed. When the tragic event was known, the sailors and soldiers regained Tsamados' brig Aris, on board which Alexandros Mavrocordatos had already taken refuge. The remaining Greek freedom fighters, with head the vice-governor Nikolaos Votsis, dared to be absolutely bold and sailed through a Turkish fleet of thirty-four ships. For four hours, they were bombarded and casualties entailed two dead along with eight wounded. This scene has been depicted in the painting of Konstantinos Volanakis "the exodus of Ares".

== Sources ==
- History of the Hellenic Nation, Vol. XII: The Greek Revolution (1821–1832) (in Greek). Ekdotiki Athinon. 1971. pp. 373–380. ISBN 960-213-097-0. OCLC 636806977. OL 18546042M.
- L’Archipel en feu at Project Gutenberg (in French)
- Smith, William and Felton, Cornelius Conway. A History of Greece: From the Earliest Times to the Roman Conquest, with Supplementary Chapters on the History of Literature and Art. Hickling, Swan, and Brown, 1855.
- Histoire picturale de la guerre de l'indépendance héllenique. Geneva. Editions d'art Boissonas et Paris: Librairie Jean Budy & Cie., 1926. [This work is a facsimile of the celebrated series of paintings commissioned by General Makryjannis sometime during the 1830s from the painter Panayotis Zographos.]
