= San Nicola da Tolentino, Naples =

Church in Naples, Italy

Coordinates: 40.840262°N 14.241670°E

San Nicola da Tolentino is a church, located in Corso Vittorio Emanuele in Naples, Italy.

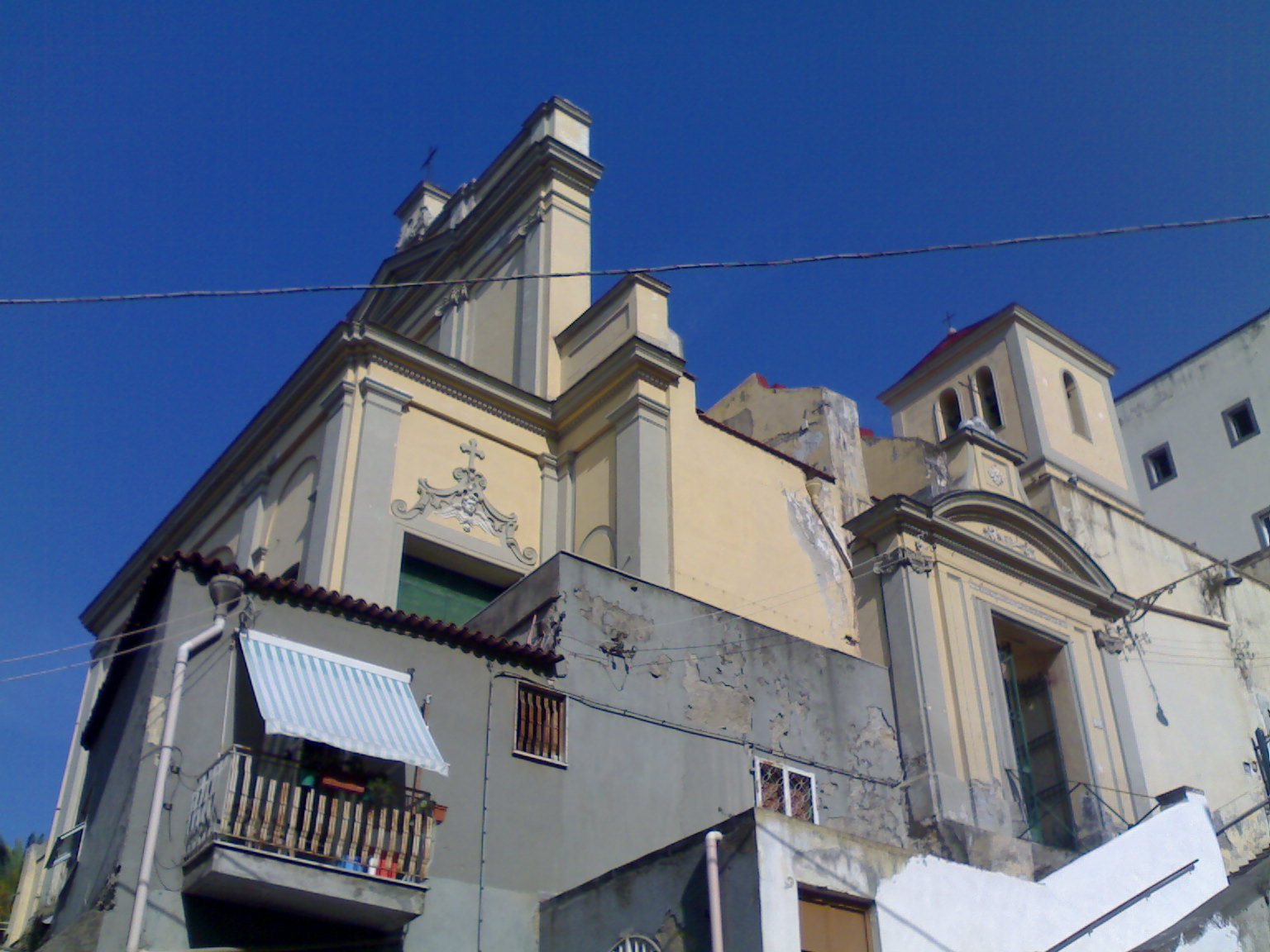
Exterior.

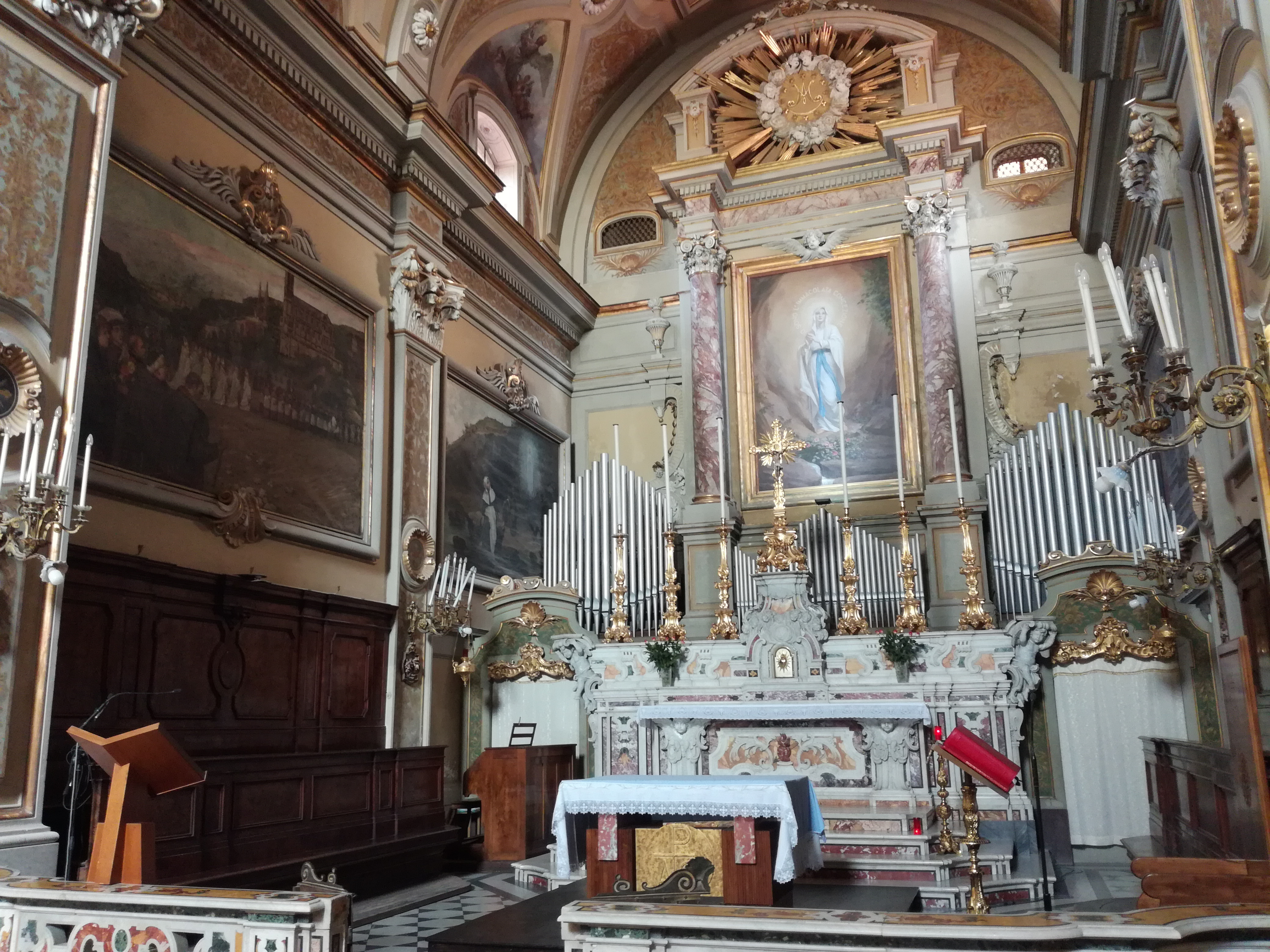
Interior.

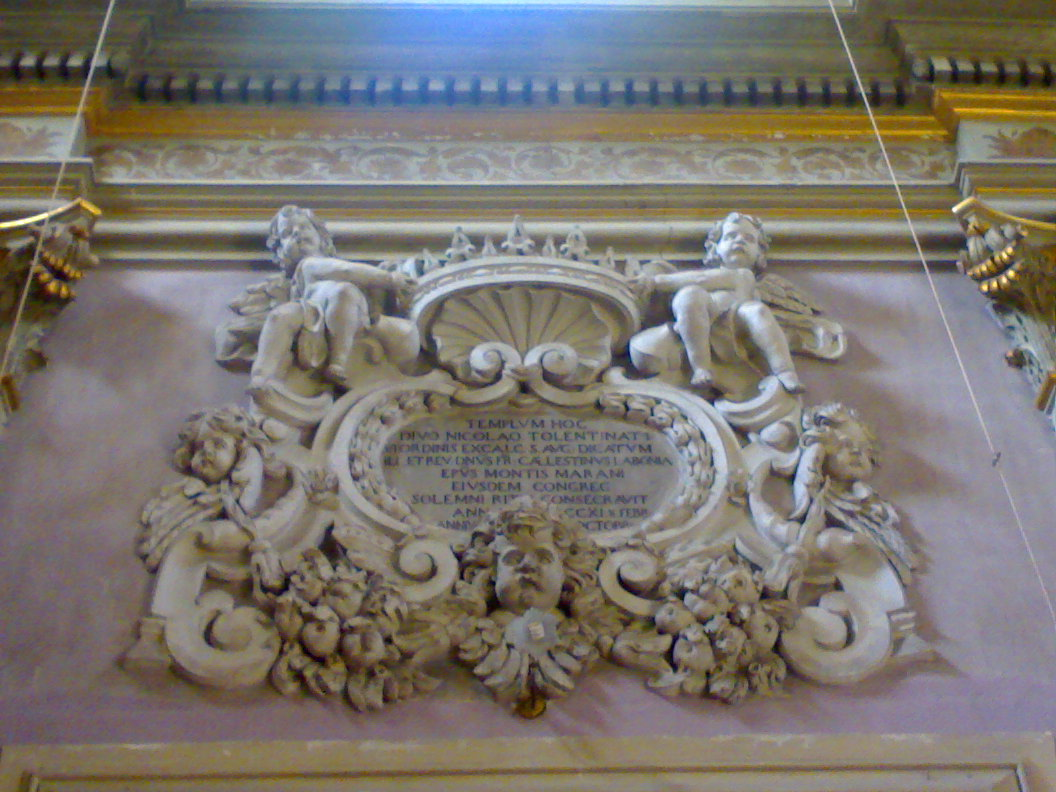
Interior detail.

The church was founded in 1618 in a zone where one of the Palaces of the Regio Consigliere Scipione De Curtis was found, and which patronized the construction of a hospice run by the Augustinian Order. After the 1631 eruption of Vesuvius, forced the monks to relocate to Resina. The monastery was then ceded to monks of the Order of San Martino and later to priests of the Congregation Vincenziani della Missione till 1836, when they were expelled, only to regain the facility in 1860 and move back in by the 20th century. Outside, a scenic staircase leads to the church atrium of the church. A series of marble inscriptions and votive offerings indicate the veneration of Our Lady of Lourdes which began in 1873.

The stucco and white marble interior is mainly the design Domenico Antonio Vaccaro following a reconstruction in the 18th century. The main altar is attributed to Granucci. In the lateral chapels is a St Joseph and Child Jesus with Saints Gennaro and Elmo by Giuseppe Castellano. It is placed next to a 16th-century crucifix. the frescoes on the ceiling (1890) were completed by Vincenzo Galloppi, who also decorated the apse in an oriental style similar to that of Domenico Morelli.

The presbytery walls were frescoed by Francesco Saverio Altamura and Bernardo Hay with stories relevant to the Virgin of Lourdes; in 1875, a reproduction of the Grotto of Lourdes was built. The site was often visited by the modern saint Doctor Giuseppe Moscati, who provided a marble plaque in gratitude to the Virgin

== Sources ==
- Interior of the church on Minister of Interior website.
