= Old Navarino castle =

Castle near Pylos, Greece

Coordinates: 36.9585°N 21.6570°E

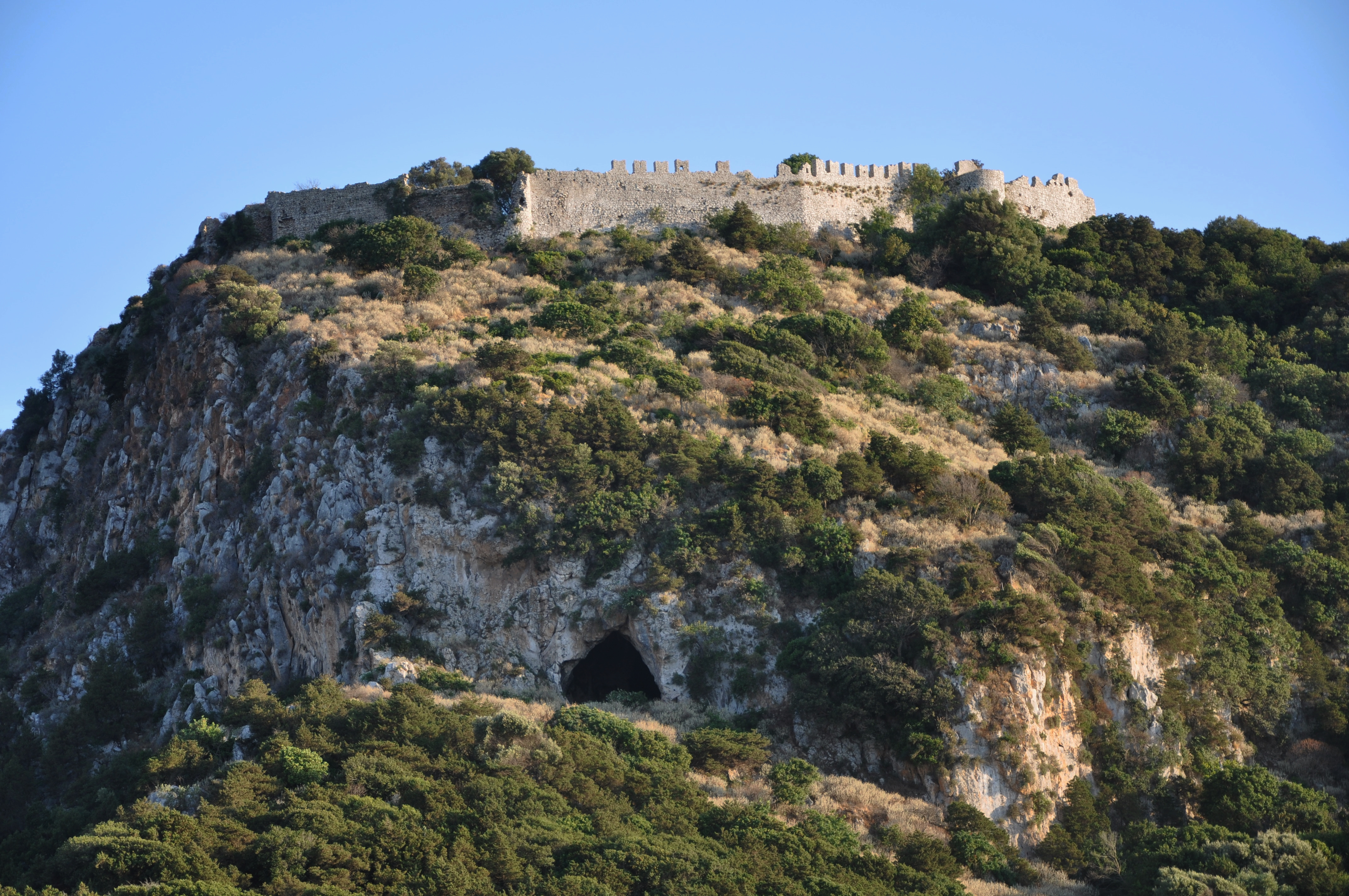
View of the ruins of the castle in 2009

View of Old Navarino Castle

Ruins of the gatehouse

The Old Navarino castle (Greek: Παλαιό Ναυαρίνο) is a 13th-century Frankish fortress near Pylos, Greece. It is one of two castles guarding the bay on which it sits; the other is the Ottoman-built New Navarino. It is frequently known simply as Palaiokastro or Paliokastro (Greek: Παλαιόκαστρο or Παλιόκαστρο, "old castle"). It occupies the site of the Athenian fort at the 425 BC Battle of Pylos.

== Name ==
In Frankish times, under the Principality of Achaea, it was known as Port-de-Jonc ("Cane Harbour") or Port-de-Junch in French, with some variants and derivatives: in Italian Porto-Junco, Zunchio or Zonchio, in medieval Catalan Port Jonc, in Latin Iuncum, Zonglon/Zonglos (Ζόγγλον/ς or Ζόγκλον/ς) in Greek, etc. In the late 14th/early 15th centuries, when it was held by the Navarrese Company, it was also known as Château Navarres, and called Spanochori (Σπανοχώρι, "village of the Spaniards") by the local Greeks.

== History ==
The castle sits atop an imposing 200-metre (660 ft) rock formation on the northern edge of the bay, flanked by sheer cliffs; the naturally defensible site has probably been occupied since classical times. Although there are no physical barriers to access, the castle ruins have been declared "closed" because the structure is considered dangerous.

In 1204, following the Fourth Crusade, the Peloponnese or Morea came under the rule of the Principality of Achaea, a Frankish Crusader state. According to the French and Greek versions of the Chronicle of the Morea, the castle was built by Nicholas II of Saint-Omer, the lord of Thebes, who in c. 1281 received extensive lands in Messenia in exchange for ceding his wife's possessions of Kalamata and Chlemoutsi to the princely domain. According to the Greek version, he intended this as a future fief for his nephew, Nicholas III, although the Aragonese version attributes the construction to Nicholas III himself, a few years later. According to the medievalist Antoine Bon, a construction under Nicholas II in the 1280s is more likely, possibly in the period 1287–89 when he served as the viceroy (bailli) of Achaea. Despite Nicholas II's intentions, however, it is unclear whether his nephew did indeed inherit Navarino. If he did, it remained his until his death in 1317, when it and all the Messenian lands of the family reverted to the princely domain, as Nicholas III had no children.

The fortress remained relatively unimportant thereafter, except for the 1350s, when the Genoese seized it as a base for raids into the Venetian possessions in the area; a naval battle took place there in 1354 between Venice and Genoa. In 1364 the castle was held by Mary of Bourbon during her conflict with the Prince Philip of Taranto, due to Mary's attempt to claim the Principality following the death of her husband, Robert of Taranto. Mary had been given possession of Navarino (along with Kalamata and Mani) by Robert in 1358, and the local castellan, loyal to Mary, briefly imprisoned the new Prince's bailli, Simon del Poggio. Mary retained control of Navarino until her death in 1377. At about this time, Albanians settled in the area, while in 1381/2, Navarrese, Gascon and Italian mercenaries were active there. From the early years of the 15th century, Venice set its eyes on the fortress of Navarino, fearing lest its rivals the Genoese seize it and use it as a base for attacks against the Venetian outposts of Modon and Coron. In the event, the Venetians seized the fortress themselves in 1417 and, after prolonged diplomatic manoeuvring, succeeded in legitimizing their new possession from the Prince of Achaea, Centurione II Zaccaria, in 1423.

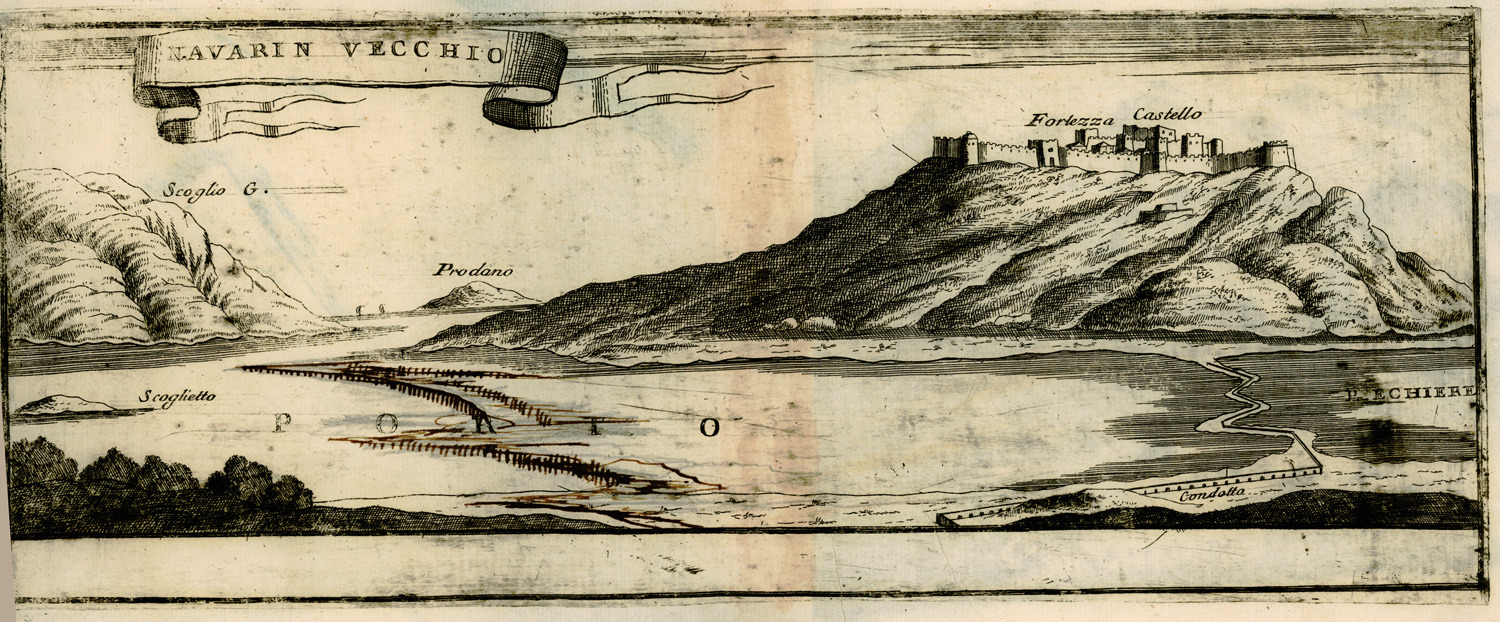
Depiction of Old Navarino in 1688, by Vincenzo Coronelli

In 1423, Navarino, like the rest of the Peloponnese, suffered its first Ottoman raid, led by Turakhan Bey, which was repeated in 1452. It was also at Navarino that Emperor John VIII Palaiologos embarked in 1437, heading for the Council of Ferrara, and where the last Despot of the Morea, Thomas Palaiologos, embarked with his family in 1460, following the Ottoman conquest of the Morea. After 1460, the fortress, along with the other Venetian outposts and Monemvasia and the Mani Peninsula, were the only Christian-held areas in the peninsula. Venetian control over Navarino survived the First Ottoman–Venetian War (1463–79), but not the Second (1499–1503): following the Venetian defeat in the Battle of Modon in August 1500, the 3,000-strong garrison surrendered, although it was well provisioned for a siege. The Venetians nevertheless recaptured it shortly after, on 3/4 December, almost by chance, with a force of only 50 men; but on 20 May 1501, a joint Ottoman land and sea attack under Kemal Reis and Hadım Ali Pasha retook it.

In 1572, after the Battle of Lepanto, Old Navarino was attacked by the forces of John of Austria, who had previously failed to capture Modon. The timely arrival of Ottoman reinforcements, the barren terrain that offered no cover, and the lack of provisions by the besiegers doomed the enterprise. In 1572/3, the Ottoman chief admiral (Kapudan Pasha) Uluç Ali Reis built the New Navarino fortress, to replace the outdated Frankish castle, and the latter declined rapidly in importance: the new fortification covered better the main practical entrance to the bay towards the south, especially as the narrower northern entrance was blocked by ships scuttled in the aftermath of Lepanto; the new site also had a more secure water supply. By the late 16th century, the old castle had only a token garrison, and it became increasingly dilapidated and partly ruined through the 17th century. During the Morean War, the Ottomans concentrated their defenses at the new fortress, and the old castle's 100-man garrison surrendered to the numerically far superior Venetians under Otto Wilhelm Königsmarck without resistance on 2 June 1686. Its 43 cannon were captured intact. New Navarino was captured shortly after. Along with the rest of the Peloponnese, the fortresses remained in Venetian hands until 1715, when the Ottomans recaptured the entire peninsula. Despite the castle's age, the Venetian inspectors sent to evaluate the Moreot fortresses in the late 17th century esteemed its natural position as far superior to New Navarino. As a result, the Venetians initially considered improving the fortress outright, but ended up doing nothing; by 1706, a list of its artillery contained only five guns of consequential size, and the castle was intended to be demolished. Whatever plans the Venetians had were interrupted by the Ottoman reconquest, but neither were any major repairs or improvements made by the Ottomans, though it was garrisoned with a token force. In April–June 1770, the area was temporarily held by the Russians, during the Russo-Turkish War of 1768–74 and the Russian-inspired Orlov Revolt in Greece.

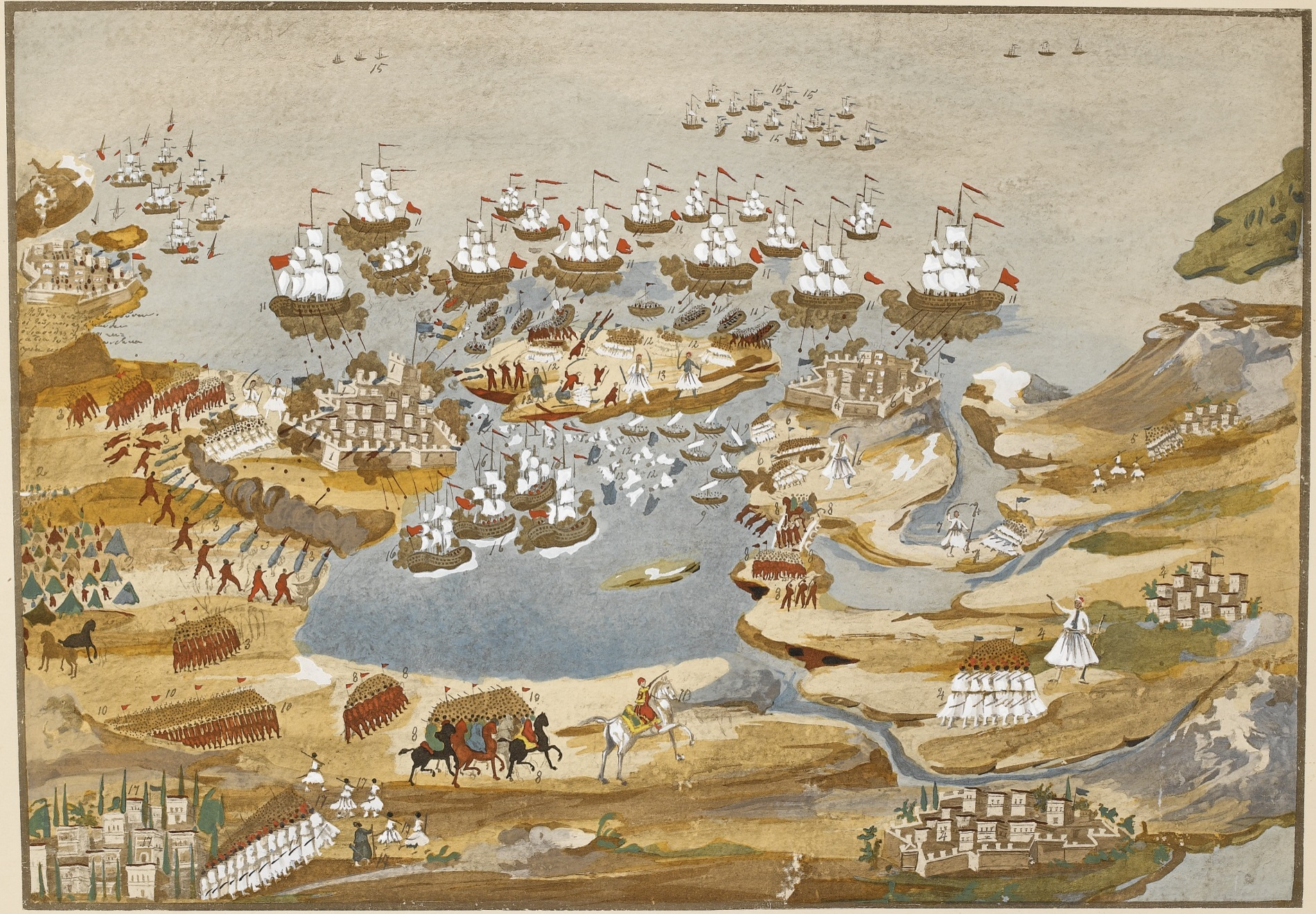
Depiction of Ibrahim Pasha's attack on Sphacteria (middle), flanked by the attacks on Navarino (left) and Palaiokastro (right) in 1825

After the outbreak of the Greek War of Independence in March 1821, the Greeks captured the New Navarino fortress and slaughtered its garrison on the first week of August 1821. The area remained in Greek hands until 1825, when Ibrahim Pasha of Egypt captured the old castle on 29 April, followed by New Navarino on 11 May. The Ottoman-Egyptian garrison remained there until it was handed over to the French troops under General Nicolas Joseph Maison in spring 1828. The French found the old castle essentially a ruin.

== Sources ==
- Andrews, Kevin (1978) [1953]. Castles of the Morea. Amsterdam: Adolf M. Hakkert. ISBN 90-256-0794-2.
- Bées, N. & Savvides, A. (1993). "Navarino". In Bosworth, C. E.; van Donzel, E.; Heinrichs, W. P. & Pellat, Ch. (eds.). The Encyclopaedia of Islam, Second Edition. Volume VII: Mif–Naz. Leiden: E. J. Brill. pp. 1037–1039. doi:10.1163/1573-3912_islam_COM_0857. ISBN 978-90-04-09419-2.
- Bon, Antoine (1969). La Morée franque. Recherches historiques, topographiques et archéologiques sur la principauté d'Achaïe [The Frankish Morea. Historical, Topographic and Archaeological Studies on the Principality of Achaea] (in French). Paris: De Boccard.
- Savvides, Alexis G. K. (1991). "On Pylos-Navarino-Zonklon in the Byzantine period, late 6th-early 13th centuries". Vyzantina. 16: 335–338.
- Savvides, Alexis G. K. (1992). "Notes on Navarino in the Frankish, Venetian and early Ottoman periods". Ekklisiastikos Faros. 74: 68–72.
- Wolpert, Aaron D. (2005). "The fortress of Anavarin-i Atik". In F. Zarinebaf; J. Bennet; J.L. Davis (eds.). A Historical and Economic Geography of Ottoman Greece: The Southwestern Morea in the 18th Century. The American School of Classical Studies at Athens. pp. 223–240. ISBN 978-0-87661-534-8.
