= Annibale Santorre di Rossi de Pomarolo, Count of Santarosa =

Italian insurgent and leader in Italy's revival (Risorgimento)

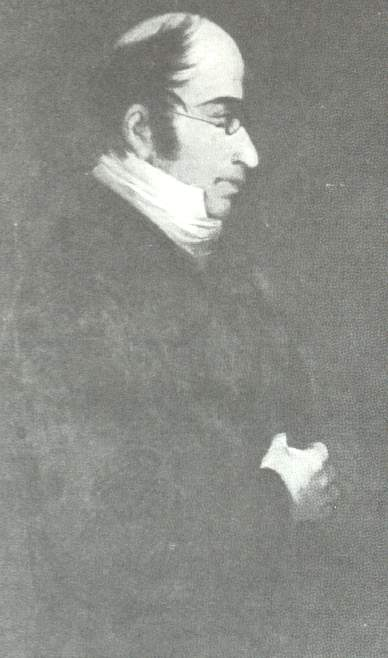
- Born: 18 November 1783
- Died: 8 May 1825 (aged 41)
- Military career
- Conflicts: Napoleonic Wars; Greek War of Independence

Santorre Annibale di Rossi de Pomarolo, Count of Santa Rosa (born 18 November 1783, Savigliano – died 8 May 1825, Sphacteria) was an Italian insurgent and leader in Italy's revival (Risorgimento).

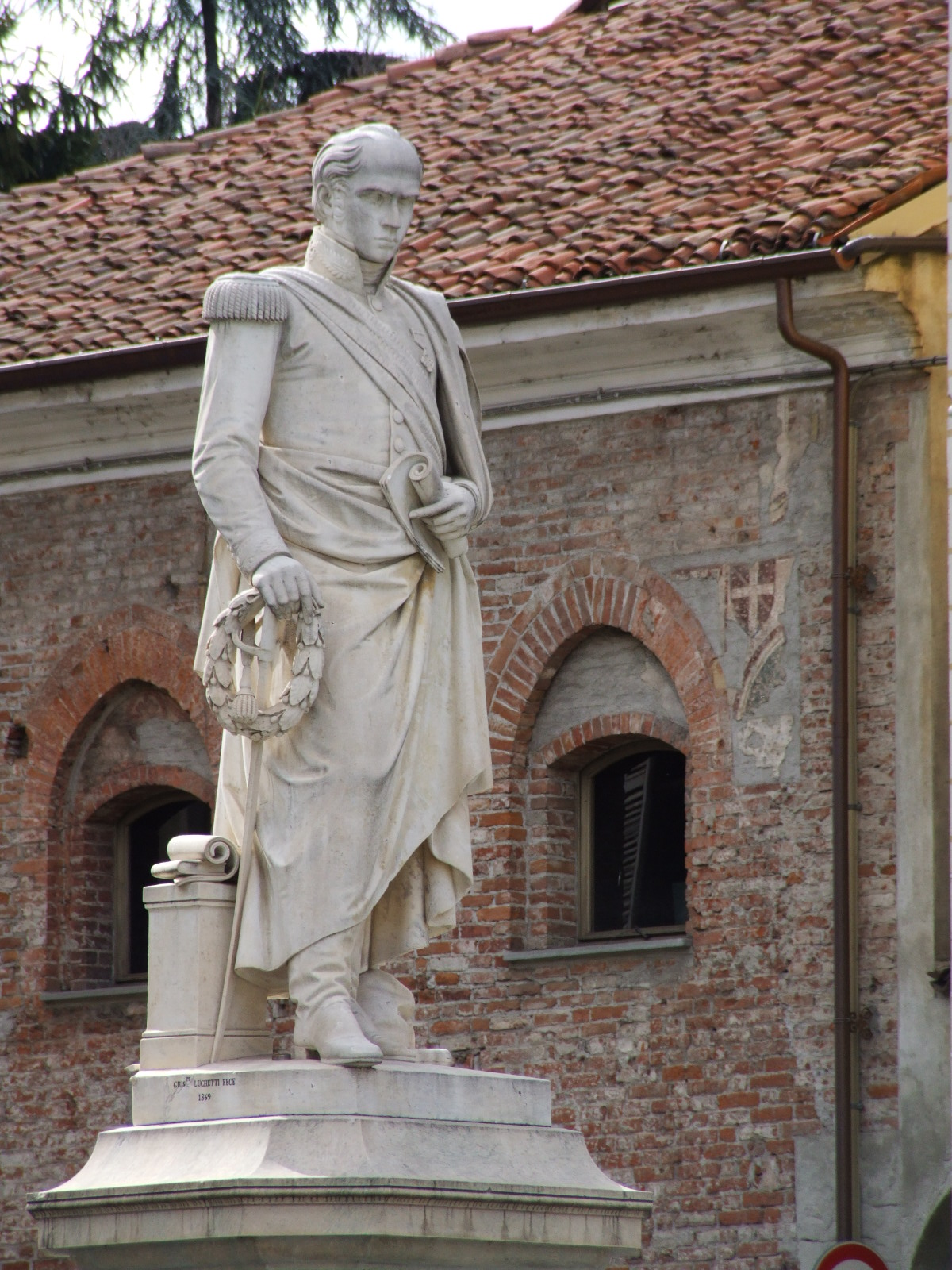
Statue of Santarosa in Savigliano

== Early life ==
He was born at Savigliano, near Cuneo, then part of the Kingdom of Sardinia. He was the son of a general officer in the Sardinian (Piedmontese) army who was killed at the battle of Mondovì in 1796. The family had been recently ennobled and was not rich.

== Career ==
Santarosa entered the service of Napoleon during the annexation of Piedmont to France, and was sub-prefect of La Spezia from 1812–1814. He remained loyal to the house of Savoy, and, after the restoration of the king of Sardinia in 1814, he continued in public service.

During the Sardinian army campaign on the southeastern frontier of France in 1815, he served as captain of grenadiers, and was afterwards employed in the ministry of war. The revolutionary and imperial epoch stimulated Italian patriotism, and Santarosa was aggrieved by the extension given to the Austrian power in Italy in 1815, which reduced his country to a position of inferiority. The revolutionary outbreak of 1820, which extended from Spain to Naples, seemed to afford the patriots an opportunity to secure Italian independence.

In 1821, when the Austrian army moved south to coerce the Neapolitans, Santarosa entered into a conspiracy to obtain the intervention of the Piedmontese in favour of the Neapolitans by an attack on the Austrian lines of communication. The conspirators endeavoured to obtain the cooperation of the prince of Carignano, afterwards King Charles Albert, who shared their patriotic aspirations.

On 6 March 1821, Santarosa and three associates had an interview with the prince, and on 10 March, they carried out the military pronunciamiento that proclaimed the Spanish constitution. The movement had little popular support and soon collapsed. During the brief predominance of his party, Santarosa showed great character. He was arrested and would have died on the scaffold had supporters not rescued him. He fled to France, and lived for a time in Paris under the name of Conti, where he wrote in French and published, in 1822, La Revolution Piemontaise, which attracted the notice of Victor Cousin. The French government discovered his hiding place, and he was imprisoned and expelled from Paris. After a short stay first at Alençon and then in Bourges, he travelled to England, where he found refuge in London with the poet Ugo Foscolo, and made English friends.

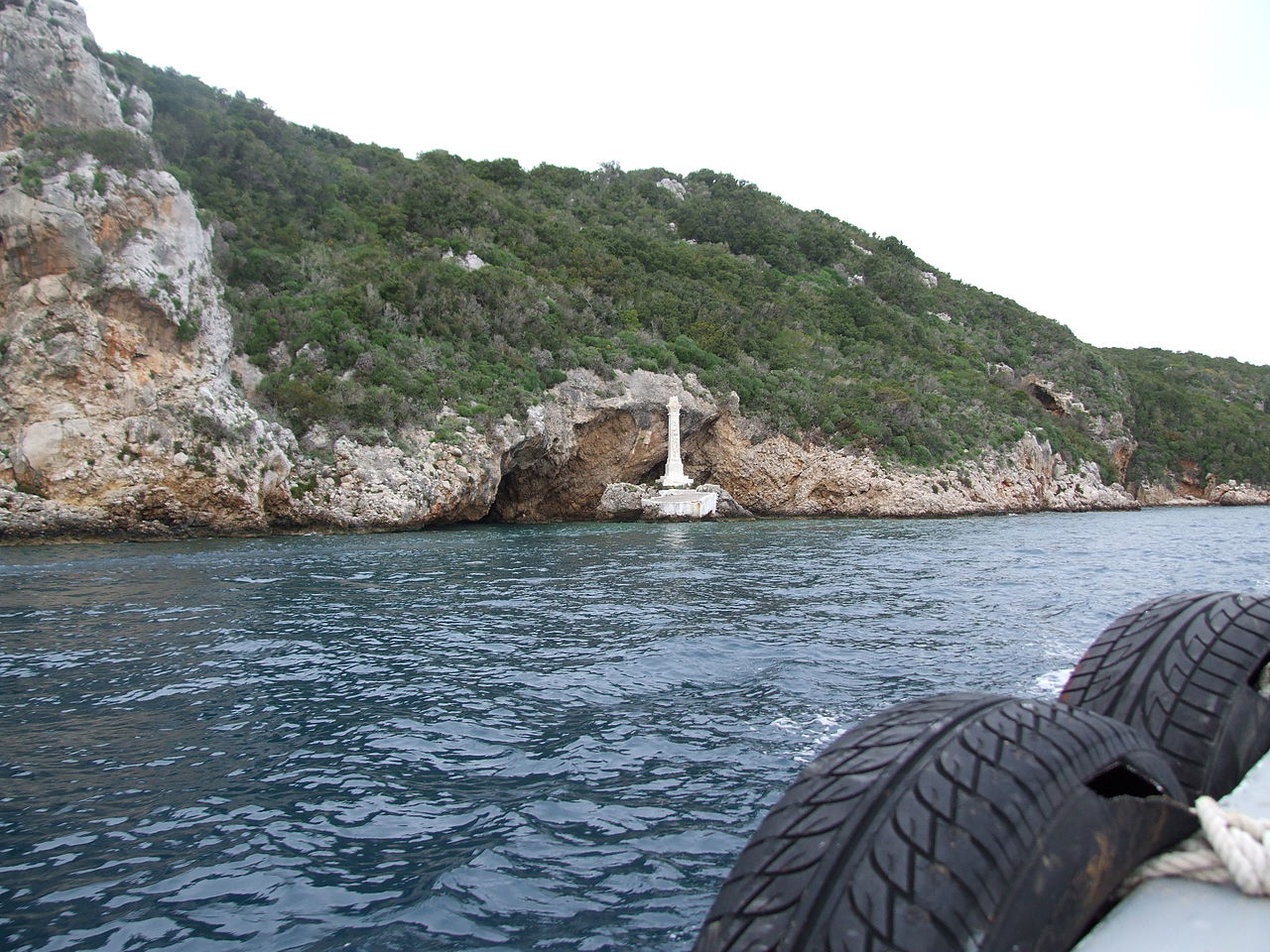
Monument in Sfaktiria, in front of the cave where he was killed.

For a few months, he lived quietly in Nottingham with his wife and eight children. Count Santa Rosa was accompanied to Greece to take part in the Greek War of Independence by another prominent Piedmontese refugee, Count Giacinto Provana di Collegno, who had also been an officer in Napoleon's army. He was asked by the Greek provisional government to change his name to Derossi in order to avoid any connections with his previous revolutionary actions, and thus avoid the rage of the Holly Alliance and the Great Powers. Santa Rosa was killed on 8 May during the Battle of Sphacteria (1825), when he was caught in a cave on the island of Sphacteria and refused to surrender.
