= Jane Benham Hay =

English painter

- Born: 1829; Uxbridge, London, United Kingdom
- Died: 11 January 1904 (aged 74–75); Brussels, Belgium
- Known for: Painting
- Movement: Pre-Raphaelite, Macchiaioli
- Spouses: William Hay (m. 1851): Francesco Saverio Altamura

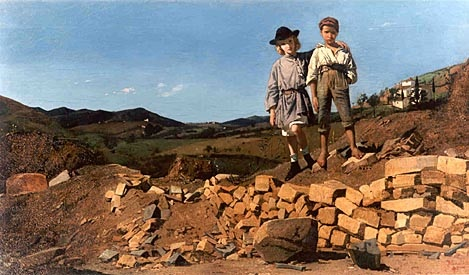
Jane Benham Hay, England and Italy, oil on canvas, 1859

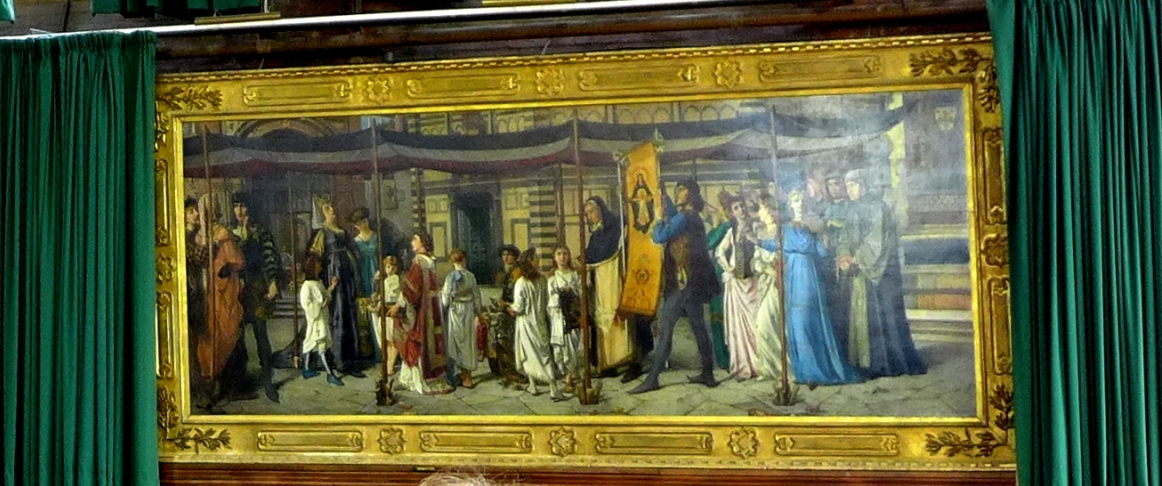
The Florentine Procession in Homerton College, Cambridge hall

Jane Eleanor Benham Hay (1829 – 11 January 1904) was an English Victorian painter and illustrator. She was loosely associated with two important artistic movements of the mid-19th century: the Pre-Raphaelite painters of Britain and the Macchiaioli of Italy.

== Biography ==
Jane Benham was born in Uxbridge, London in 1829 to Ebenezer Hay and Mary Ann Essex Hay. She was born into a family of iron, copper, and metal workers. She travelled to Munich in 1850 with a friend, Anna Mary Howitt (1824–1884). Together, they hoped to engage in serious study of drawing and painting, but after their arrival in Munich, it became clear that women would not be permitted to study at the Academy. Undeterred, they approached Wilhelm von Kaulbach, then Director of the academy, and requested the privilege of private study in his studio. He agreed and permitted them to work there at liberty, although it is unclear how much formal instruction he gave them. Jane stayed in Munich until December 1850, when she was compelled to return to London. Anna Mary remained in Munich for two full years, returning to London in 1852. There she compiled her diary and personal letters into a text, An Art Student in Munich, which was published in 1853 and reissued in 1880. In the text, she uses the pseudonym Clare to refer to Jane Benham.

Jane married artist William Hay in 1851 and they had a son the following year. However, their marriage did not last long as Jane left London for Florence in the mid-1850s. Around the same time, she met Francesco Saverio Altamura (born 1822 or 1826 – died 1897), a painter who had associated with Macchiaioli painters of Tuscany, who are considered the Italian precursors to the Impressionists. Altamura had had a colourful life and gained a predilection for historical and religious paintings. They eloped and, after Altamura abandoned his wife (the renowned Greek artist Eleni Boukoura-Altamoura) and their children, they had a son together, Bernard or Bernardo Hay (1862–1934).

Jane Benham Hay exhibited at the Royal Academy in 1848, 1849, 1859, 1861, and 1862. Her two entries of 1859, England and Italy and Portrait of a Boy in Florentine Costume, established her reputation. Painted just prior to the unification of Italy, England and Italy was a powerful statement in favour of democratic unification, as well as a compelling work of art. John Ruskin noted that both works were "masterly complete in effect". although he did not care for the political overtones. England and Italy went missing some time after 1859, and was not rediscovered until the late 1990s.

In 1867 Jane Hay achieved her greatest professional success with The Florentine Procession, also known as The Burning of the Vanities, which was exhibited by Henry Wallis at the French Gallery in London. This painting is now in the collection of Homerton College, Cambridge.

Her later life is not well documented. She died in Brussels, Belgium, in 1904.
