= Vincenzo Acquaviva =

Italian painter (1832–1902)

- Born: 1832; Foggia, Kingdom of the Two Sicilies
- Died: 7 September 1902 (aged 69–70)
- Education: Institute of Fine Arts, Naples, Italy

Vincenzo Acquaviva (1832 – September 7, 1902) was an Italian painter.

He was born in Foggia. When he was but seven years old, he trained for a year under Domenico Caldara in Foggia. In 1848, he was admitted to the Institute of Fine Arts in Naples. There he joined the studio of the painter Francesco Saverio Altamura. He was judged by Guerra and Marinelli for the second prize at a local competition. In 1850, he made a copy of Abele by Caldara for his hometown. In 1856, he gained a stipend from Foggia. In 1856, he painted Illuminato (now in city of Foggia). In 1864, he painted Preghiera for the National Exposition of Florence. In 1866, his painting of Il carattere delle donne italiane was awarded a first prize gold medal at an exposition in Utrecht. He painted portraits of Cardinal Vicario La Valetta, Count Michele Pironti, and Signora Correnti.
