= Irenes Serenade =

Irenes Serenade was an oil tanker that caught fire, exploded, and sank in Navarino Bay, Greece, in February, 1980. It was one of the largest oil spills in history.

The ship, owned by Tsakos Shipping Company, was traveling from Syria to Trieste, Italy loaded with over 100,000 tonnes (98,000 long tons; 110,000 short tons) of Iraqi crude oil. It approached Navarino Bay to refuel on February 23. While maneuvering into the bay, fire broke out on the ship, followed by an explosion. It burned for 14 hours. The ship was still in flames when it sank off Sfaktiria Island the next day.

Two of the 31 person crew were killed in the explosion. A local fisherman saw the explosion and helped to save the other 29 crew members. Local fishermen also attempted to collect the oil in their boats and to transfer it into road tankers. They were not very successful. Six oil recovery vessels arrived to manage the marine pollution. Of the 102,660 tonnes (101,040 long tons; 113,160 short tons) of oil on the Irenes Serenade, 35,000 to 40,000 t (34,000 to 39,000 long tons; 39,000 to 44,000 short tons) spilled into the bay. An estimated 4,000 t (3,900 long tons; 4,400 short tons) were consumed by fire and 25,000 t (25,000 long tons; 28,000 short tons) evaporated.

The Irenes Serenade was built in 1965 by Chantiers de l'Atlantique and was previously named Aldebaran. In 2011, Greek researchers used remote sensing to image the shipwreck.
