= Greek brig Aris =

Historical Greek ship

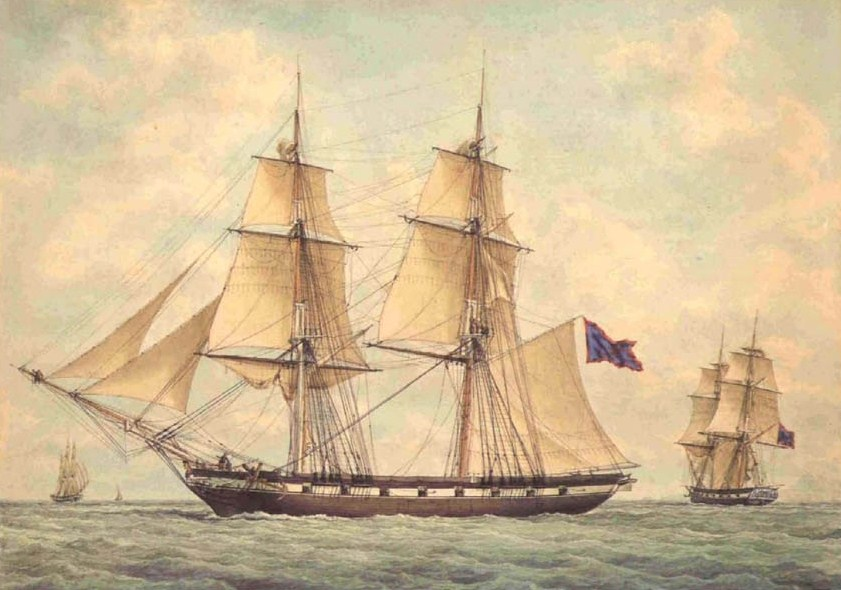
- The Aris during the Greek War of Independence

History

Greece
- Name: Aris
- Launched: 1807
- Commissioned: 1821
- Decommissioned: 1921
- Fate: Scuttled, 25 March 1921

General characteristics
- Type: Brig
- Displacement: 350 long tons (356 t)
- Length: 30.5 m (100 ft)
- Beam: 8.8 m (29 ft)
- Draught: 4.9 m (16 ft)
- Sail plan: Square rig
- Complement: 82
- Armament: As built: 16 × 12-pounder cannon; Later; 2 × 12-pounder cannon; 10 × 24-pounder carronades

The brig Aris (Greek: Άρης, named after the god of war, Ares), was one of the most distinguished Greek ships during the Greek War of Independence and continued to serve in the Greek Navy until the early 20th century as a training ship.

== History ==
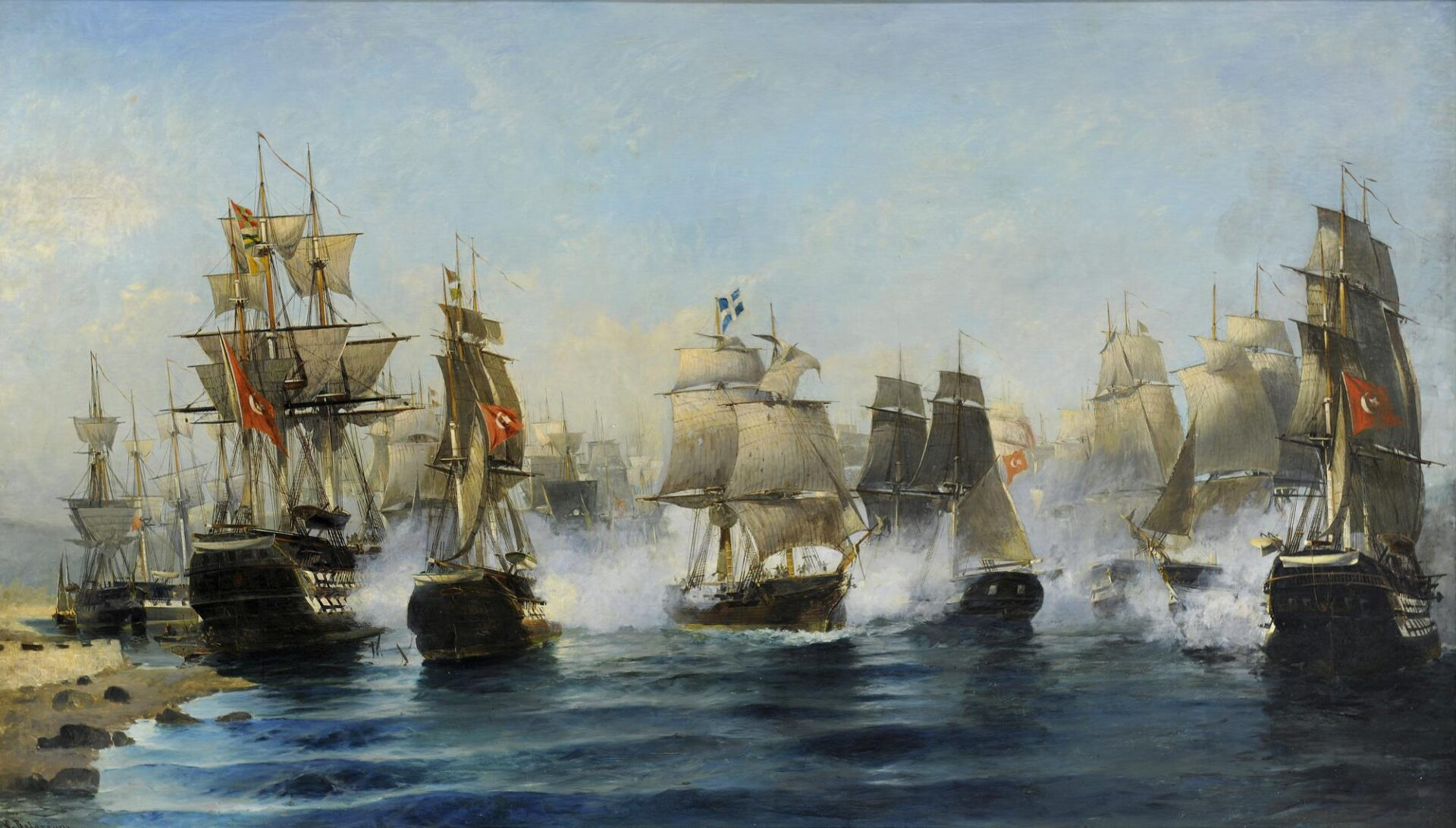
The oil painting "The sortie of Aris", by Konstantinos Volanakis

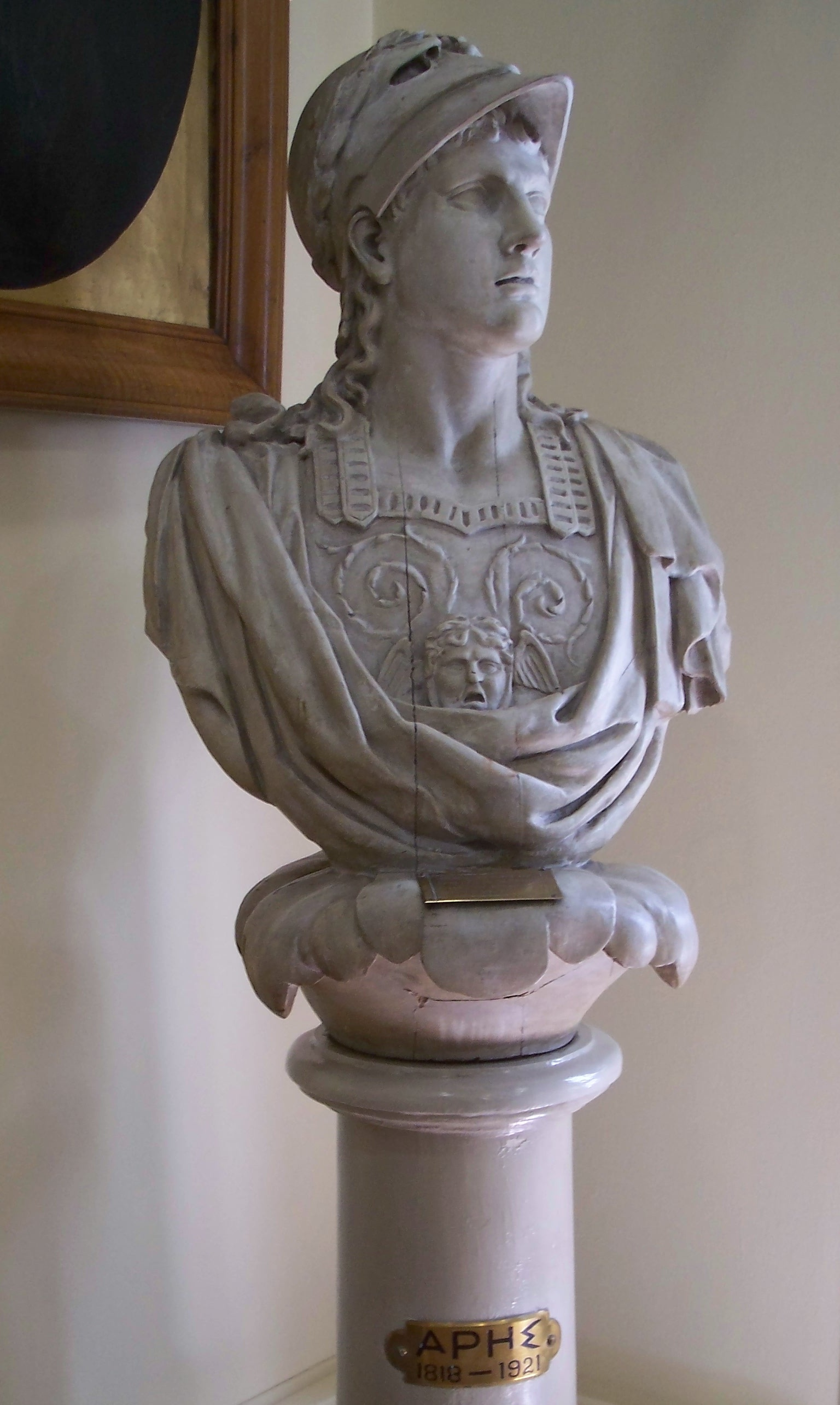
The figurehead of Aris, today in the National Historical Museum, Athens

The 350-ton Aris was constructed as a merchant vessel in Venice in 1807. Upon the outbreak of the Greek Revolution in March 1821, her owner, Anastasios Tsamados (1774-1825) from Hydra, armed the ship with 16 12-pounder guns and joined the fleet of his home island. Aris participated in many of the early naval clashes with the Ottoman Navy, but became famous after the action fought at Navarino on 8 May [O.S. 26 April] 1825, which became known as the "Sortie of Aris" (Έξοδος του Άρεως).

=== Sphacteria ===
At that time, a Greek garrison was quartered at the island of Sphacteria, which controlled the entrance of the excellent natural harbour of the Bay of Pylos (Navarino). Ibrahim Pasha of Egypt, tasked by the Ottoman sultan to suppress the Greek revolt, needed to take the island in order to use the bay for his own purposes. Aris, along with 5 other brigs, were anchored at Sphacteria when, on the morning of April 26, the combined Ottoman-Egyptian fleet arrived and started its attack on the island, bombarding the Greek positions and disembarking numerous troops. Most captains of the ships were on land, along with part of their crews, who were manning the island's cannons. The other ships sailed before the Ottoman fleet could seal off the bay, and after fighting off the Ottomans, were able to escape. The crew of Aris however still awaited their captain, who had been killed. Instead, Nikolaos Votsis, the captain of the Athena, which had already sailed without him, and Dimitrios Sachtouris, the commander of the Navarino fortress, came aboard, fleeing the advancing Egyptian soldiers. Votsis took over as captain, with Sachtouris as his first mate, and set sail. Also present on the ship was the Secretary of State, Alexandros Mavrokordatos, who was sent to the hold for safety.

Aris sailed through the midst of the Turco-Egyptian fleet, being attacked on all sides for several hours and facing in total 32 ships one after another, before reaching the open sea. Casualties among the crew were just two dead and six wounded.

=== After the Revolution ===
After the end of the War of Independence, the ship was bought by the Greek government for the new Royal Hellenic Navy and renamed Athena (Αθηνά). It reverted to its old name in 1879, and was in service, mainly as a training vessel for the Hellenic Naval Academy, until 7 April [O.S. 25 March] 1921, when it was ceremonially sunk off Salamis with full honours on the 100th anniversary of the Greek Revolution. The action, justified on the grounds of the expense involved in the ship's maintenance, caused much criticism at the time from those who favoured her retention as a naval monument. Today, only the ship's figurehead is preserved, at the National Historical Museum of Athens.

== Sources ==
- "Η έξοδος του Άρη" [The sortie of Aris]. Hellenic National Defence General Staff official website (in Greek). Archived from the original on 6 July 2015.
- Politis, Stylianos. "Iστορικής αξίας αντικείμενα στο Nαύσταθμο Σαλαμίνας" [Objects of historical value at Salamis Naval Base]. Union of Retired Hellenic Navy Officers official website (in Greek). Archived from the original on 4 March 2016.
