= Ioannis Altamouras =

Greek painter (1852–1878)

Ioannis Altamouras Ιωάννης Αλταμούρας
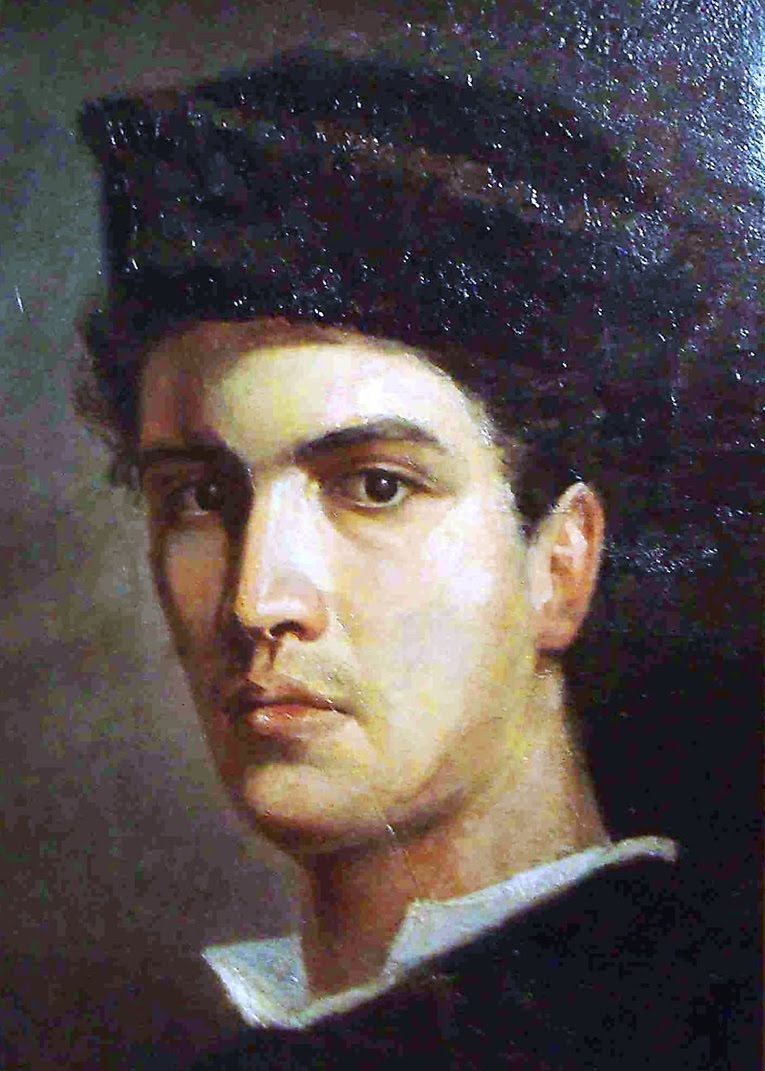
- Self portrait
- Born: 1852; Florence or Naples
- Died: 1878 (aged 25–26); Spetses, Greece
- Occupation: painter

Ioannis Altamouras (Greek: Ιωάννης Αλταμούρας) (1852, in Florence or Naples – 1878, in Spetses) was a Greek painter of the 19th century famous for his paintings of seascapes. Another notable seascape painter was Konstantinos Volanakis.

== Biography ==
Altamouras's father was the Italian painter Francesco Saverio Altamura, and his mother was the aristocrat and first Greek female painter from Spetses, Eleni Boukoura-Altamoura. When Altamouras was seven years old, his father abandoned the family. His mother then took him along with his sister Sophia and moved to Athens. From an early age, Ioannis exhibited his artistic skills in painting. He was accepted to the Athens School of Fine Arts, where he studied painting along with Nikiphoros Lytras during the years 1871–1872. With a scholarship of King George I, he was able to continue his studies in Copenhagen from 1873 to 1876 near Carl Frederik Sørensen. In 1875 and while he was still in Copenhagen, he was sent to the artistic competition of Olympion in Athens with his painting The port of Copenhagen which won the second award. He returned to Athens where he opened his own painting atelier while his fame and reputation was rapidly expanding. He died from tuberculosis at the age of 26. His death led his mother to a nervous breakdown and subsequent madness.

== Work ==
Despite his early death, Altamouras left a number of paintings, mostly small-scale. In particular, his seascape paintings that he almost exclusively produced are considered equal to the works of another Greek painter of seascapes, Konstantinos Volanakis. In 1878, the year of his death, two of his works (Destruction of the Ottoman flagship by Papanikolis in Eressos and the Naval battle of Captain Miaoulis) were presented at the International Exhibition of Paris. The latter was also presented at the Exhibition of the Sacred Battle of 1821 at the Athens Polytechnic in 1884. Another of his seascape paintings was presented at the International Exhibition of Rome in 1911.

Art critics have attributed his work to the Munich School Greek art movement. His marine scenes show the influence of 17th-century Dutch seascapes and French plein-air painting. The vivid light, the bright blues, greens, yellows and greys, the open horizons and the motion in his works show that he was gradually discarding the strict perfection of academic realism and favouring more impressionism. Many of his works are today exhibited at the National Gallery of Athens and other museums and institutions in Greece.

== Gallery ==
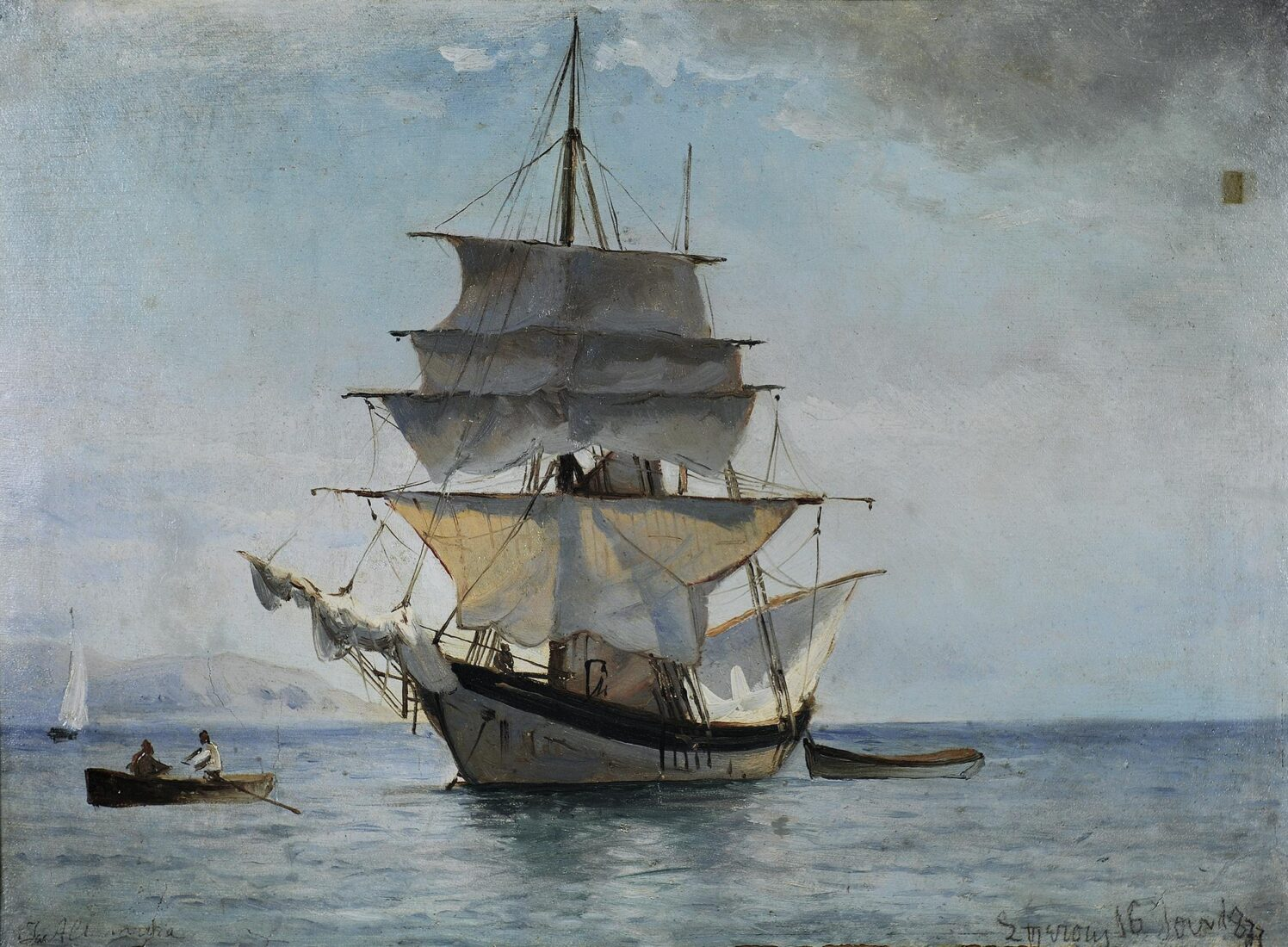
Ships at Spetses

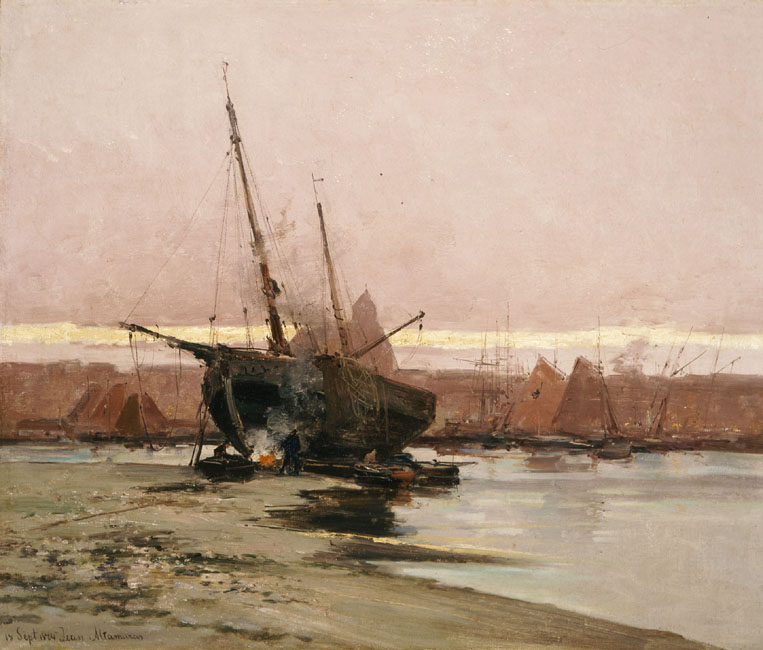
Ships on the Beach

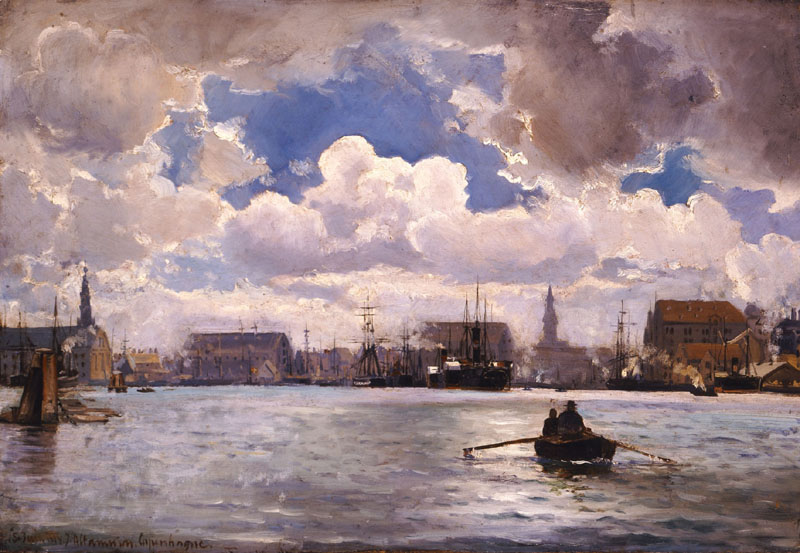
Harbor of Copenhagen

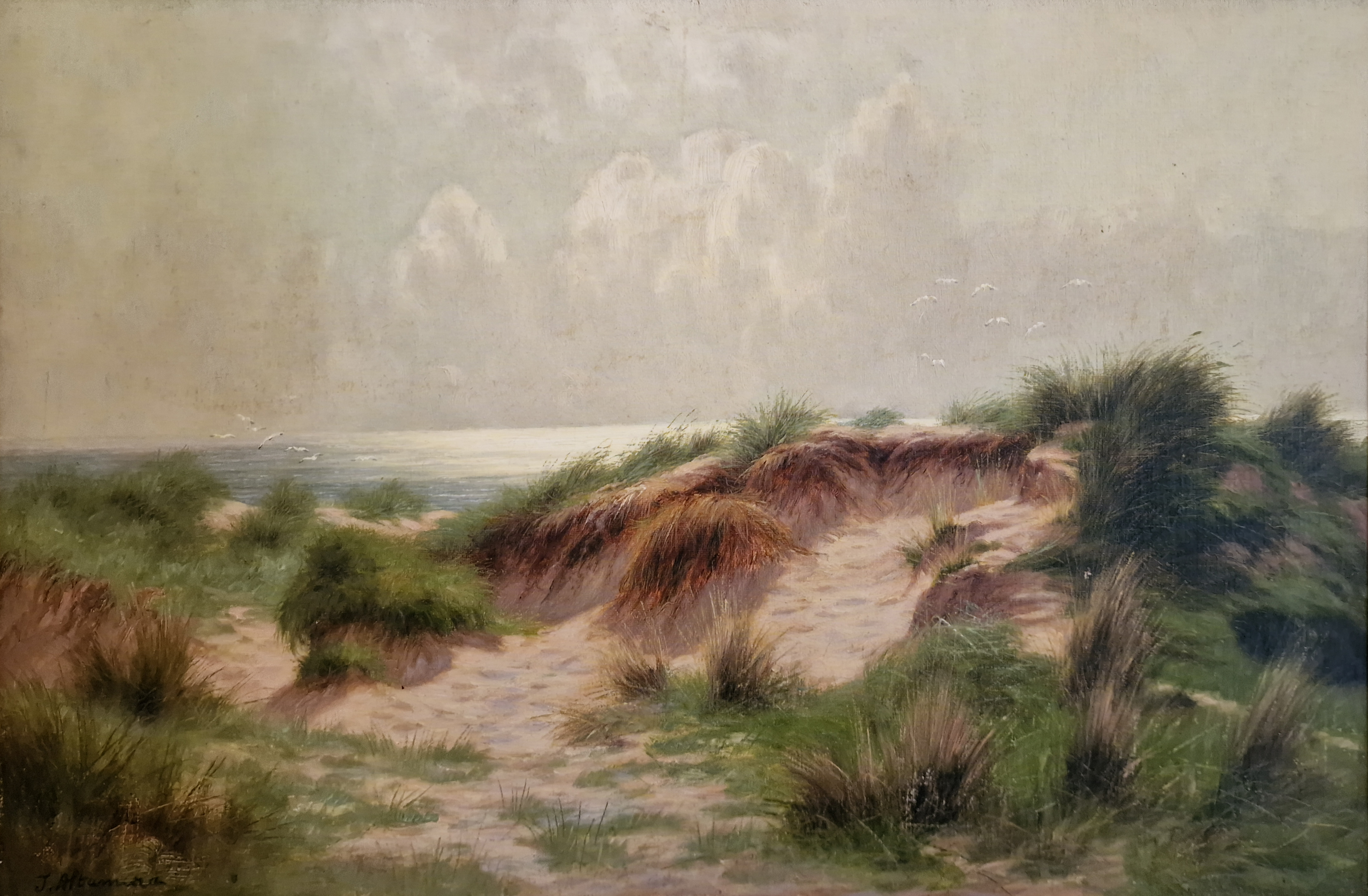
Landscape

== See also ==
- Munich School
- National Gallery of Athens
- Konstantinos Volanakis
- Seascapes
