= Eleni Boukoura-Altamoura =

Greek painter

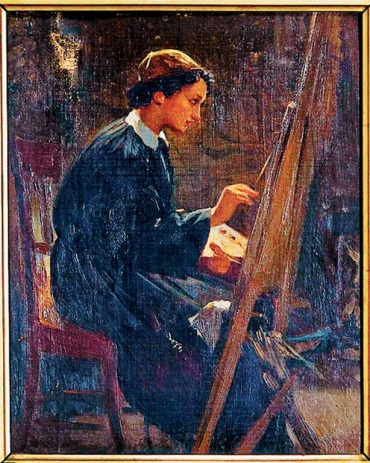
- Self portrait of Eleni Boukoura-Altamoura
- Born: Eleni Boukoura; 1821; Spetses, Greece
- Died: 1900 (aged 78–79); Spetses, Greece
- Style: Portraitist
- Movement: Neoclassicism, Romanticism
- Spouse: Francesco Saverio Altamura

Eleni Boukoura-Altamoura (Greek: Ελένη Μπούκουρα-Αλταμούρα; 1821–1900), also known as Eleni Boukouras or Helen Boukoura, was a Greek painter. She is noted as being the first great female painter of Greece.

== Biography ==
Eleni was an Arvanite. She was born on the island of Spetses in 1821. She was the daughter of Yannis Boukouras, a wealthy aristocrat and entertainer who had opened one of the first theaters in Athens following the Greek War of Independence. Eleni developed an interest in art from a young age. Seeing this, her father hired Italian artist Raffaello Ceccoli as a tutor for his daughter. She continued her studies, and at the age of 27 left for Naples with a letter of recommendation from Ceccoli to begin her education as an artist. While studying in Naples and Florence, she dressed as a man in order to attend art classes.

While studying in Italy, Eleni began a relationship with Italian painter Francesco Saverio Altamura, with whom she had three children. She later converted to Catholicism and married Altamura to legitimize the relationship, though her husband would eventually leave Eleni for his mistress, British painter Jane Benham Hay. Eleni and two of her children (her youngest son, Alexander, remained in the custody of her estranged husband) relocated to Athens, where Eleni made a living through painting and teaching art lessons. In 1872 she and her daughter Sophia moved to her family home on Spetses when Sophia contracted tuberculosis. Sophia died of the disease before the end of the year at the age of 18, and so Eleni returned to Athens. In 1876 her son Ioannis, himself a noted seascape painter, finished his studies in Copenhagen and returned to live with his mother in Athens. Just as with his sister before him, Ioannis contracted tuberculosis, succumbing to the disease in 1878. After his death, she burned some of her son's paintings along with many of her own works, and retreated from society. At some point she returned to Spetses, where she died in relative obscurity in 1900.

=== Legacy ===
Eleni Boukoura is considered one of first great female artists of Modern Greece. The tragedies she experienced in her life were the subject of Greek author Rhea Galanaki's novel Eleni, or, Nobody, which was later adapted into a play.
