= Michalis Oikonomou =

Greek impressionist painter (1888–1933)

Michalis Oikonomou Μιχάλης Οικονόμου
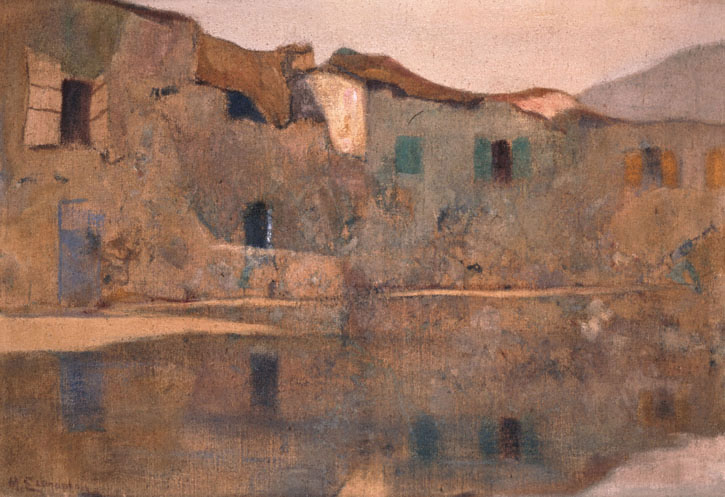
- Martigues (c. 1913), oil on canvas, 38 x 55 cm. In the collection of the National Gallery of Greece
- Born: 1888; Piraeus, Greece
- Died: 1933 (aged 44–45); Athens, Greece
- Known for: Painter
- Movement: Impressionism

Michalis Oikonomou (also Mihalis Ikonomou or Michael Economou; Greek: Μιχάλης Οικονόμου, 1888–1933) was a Greek impressionist painter. He was born in 1888 in Piraeus in the Attica prefecture (then Attica-Viotia) and went to school there. His first art teacher was Konstantinos Volanakis. In 1906, he moved to Paris, where he studied shipbuilding, and also attended art school there. Between 1913 and 1926, he had three one-man shows (two in Paris and one in London) and took part in many group exhibits. He returned to Greece in 1926 and lived in Athens. He studied there in Parnassos. In 1929, his last exhibit was shown at the Public Theatre in Piraeus. He died in Athens in 1933. He used mostly earthy colours, including browns and greens.He painted mostly seaside paintings which reminded him of Greece landscapes that he was longing for all his life in France, so he expressed his nostalgia through his paintings.
