= New Navarino fortress =

Ottoman fortress near Pylos, Greece

Coordinates: 36.911736°N 21.691128°E

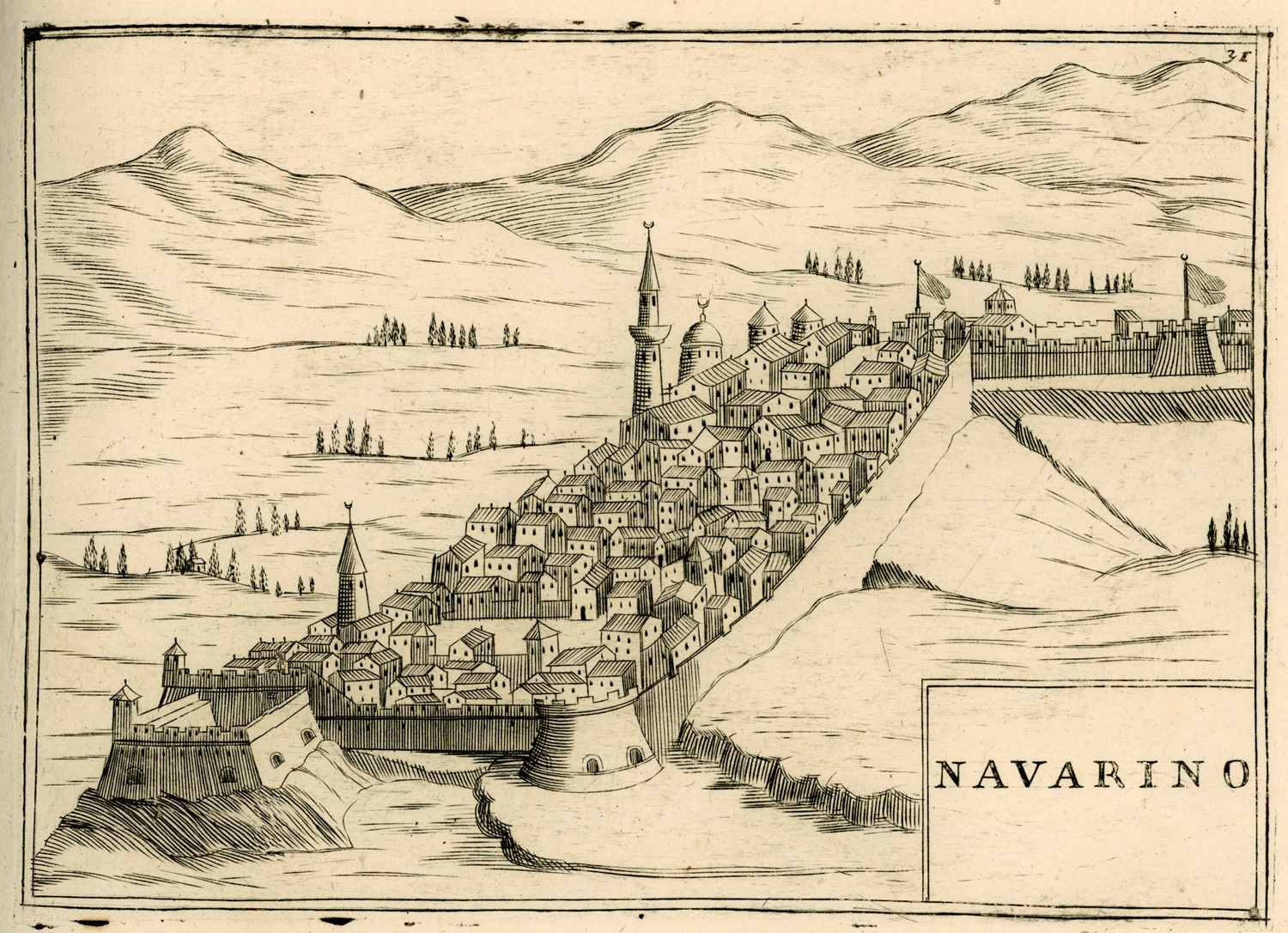
Sketch of the fortress and its town by Vincenzo Coronelli, 1688

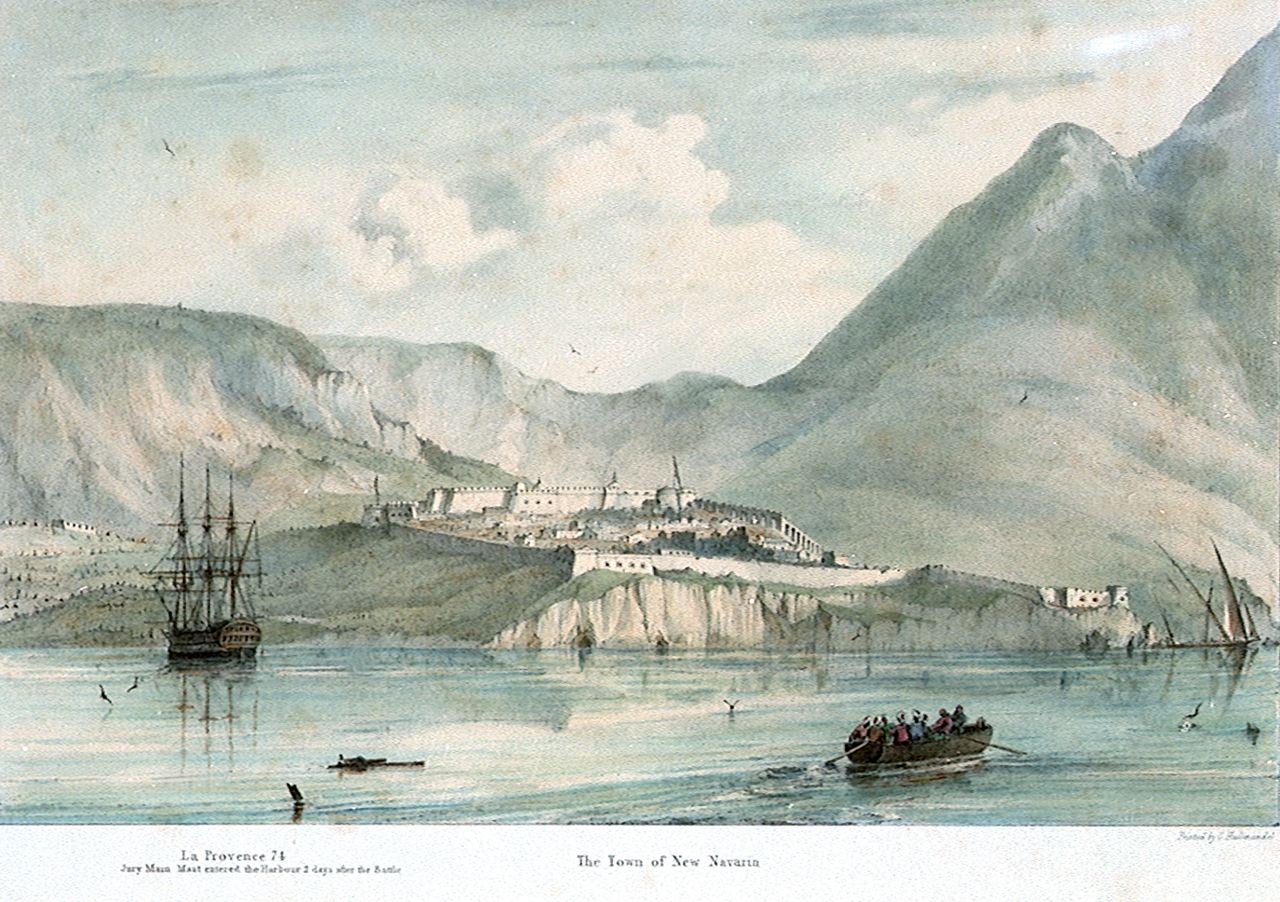
View of the fortress from the sea, 1827

The fortress of New Navarino (Greek: Νέο Ναυαρίνο; Ottoman Turkish: Anavarin-i cedid) is an Ottoman fortification near Pylos, Greece. It is one of two castles guarding the strategic Bay of Pylos, on which it sits; New Navarino is located in the southern entrance of the bay, while the northern entrance is guarded by the 13th-century Old Navarino castle, built by the Crusaders of the Principality of Achaea. In juxtaposition with the latter, New Navarino is often known simply as Neokastro or Niokastro (Greek: Νεόκαστρο or Νιόκαστρο, "new castle").

== History ==
The fortress was built by the Ottoman Kapudan Pasha, Uluç Ali Reis, in 1572/3, shortly after the Battle of Lepanto. In 1645, Navarino was used as a base for the Ottoman invasion of Crete during the opening stages of the Cretan War. During the Morean War, the Republic of Venice under Francesco Morosini captured both fortresses at Navarino in 1686, defended by Mustafa Pasha and Djafer Pasha respectively. Along with the rest of the Peloponnese, the fortresses remained in Venetian hands until 1715, when the Ottomans recaptured the entire peninsula.

The fortress was captured by the Russians on 10 April 1770, during the Russo-Turkish War of 1768–1774 and the Russian-inspired Orlov revolt in Greece, after a six-day siege, and the Ottoman garrison was allowed to evacuate to Crete. Russian control was brief: already on 1 June 1770, the Russian fleet abandoned Navarino, which they destroyed in part, to the Ottomans.

After the outbreak of the Greek War of Independence in March 1821, the Greeks besieged the fortress for several months. The garrison surrendered in the first week of August 1821 after being assured of safe passage, but were all massacred. The fortress remained in Greek hands until captured by Ibrahim Pasha of Egypt on 11 May 1825. The Ottoman-Egyptian garrison remained in the fortress until it was handed over to the French troops of the Morea expedition under General Nicolas Joseph Maison in October 1828.

In 1830, the modern town of Pylos was founded outside the fortress walls. The fort was abandoned and its citadel used for a long time as a prison facility.

== Description ==
In contrast to the medieval Old Navarino castle, New Navarino incorporates the lessons of gunpowder warfare, and follows the trace italienne style with thick and sloped walls, and strengthened with bastions. The two most important bastions, the so-called "Seventh" (Έβδομο) and that of "Santa Maria", face towards the sea and cover the harbour. The fortress also featured a citadel, which was protected by an additional dry moat, six pentagonal bastions, and almost 60 guns. The citadel is connected with the "Seventh" via a long southern wall, the so-called "Great Bough" (Μεγάλη Βέργα). The main entrance to the fortress was to the southeast, from the "Scalding Gate" (Ζεματίστρα). Only ruins survive of the settlement inside the fortress walls, except for the fortress mosque, which after Greek independence was converted into an Orthodox church dedicated to the Transfiguration of Christ.

== Sources ==
- Andrews, Kevin (1978) [1953]. Castles of the Morea. Amsterdam: Adolf M. Hakkert. ISBN 90-256-0794-2.
- Bées, N. & Savvides, A. (1993). "Navarino". In Bosworth, C. E.; van Donzel, E.; Heinrichs, W. P. & Pellat, Ch. (eds.). The Encyclopaedia of Islam, Second Edition. Volume VII: Mif–Naz. Leiden: E. J. Brill. pp. 1037–1039. doi:10.1163/1573-3912_islam_COM_0857. ISBN 978-90-04-09419-2.
