= Francesco Saverio Altamura =

Italian painter

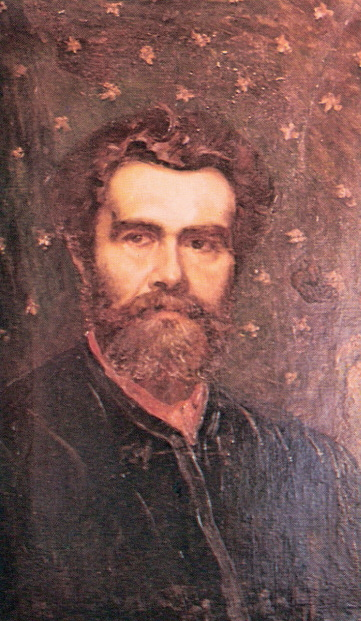
Francesco Saverio Altamura

Francesco Saverio Altamura (5 August 1822 – 5 January 1897) was an Italian painter, author and patriot known for Romantic style canvases depicting mainly historical events. He also took part in the Risorgimento, fighting in the 1848 Naples uprising.

== Biography ==
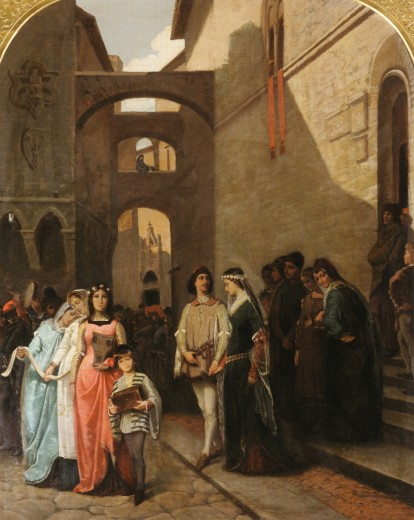
Medieval Marriage: Marriage of Buondelmonte

He was born in Foggia, into a distinguished family. His father was named Rafaelle Altamura. His mother, Sofia Perifano, was of Greek descent.

Altamura moved to Naples in 1840, initially with the aim to study medicine. He was enrolled in the school of the Scolopi priests. But his interests led him to attend the Accademia di Belle Arti alongside Domenico Morelli. he also befriended Michele De Napoli. But like his friend, he became part of the protests during the insurrection of 1848. He fought in the barricades of Santa Brigida. He was briefly arrested, and condemned to death, and upon which he fled into exile in L'Aquila, then by 1850 to Florence. There he entered into the circle of artists frequenting the Caffè Michelangiolo, and the painters of the Tuscan school of the Macchiaioli. Yet Francesco's paintings, unlike those of the Macchiaioli, were focused on historic and political events.

In 1848, he took part in the Naples uprising. For his revolutionary actions, he was forced to seek asylum in Florence.

In 1855, with Morelli and Serafino De Tivoli, he traveled to the World Exposition at Paris. In 1860, he returned to Naples, this time fighting alongside the forces of Giuseppe Garibaldi. He then became active in politics as well as art. In 1861, he submitted the painting of the Funeral of Buondelmonte to the "Prima esposizione nazionale" held in Florence.

In 1865, he frescoed the chapel of the Palazzo Reale of Naples. In 1892, he painted five altarpieces and four canvases for the restored parish church of Castrignano de' Greci in the province of Lecce.

His first wife, Elena Bùkuras, was a Greek painter, with whom he had three children, a daughter, Sofia, and two sons who became painters Ioannis and Alessandro. But he then had two further companions, the Greek painter Eleni Sionti, and finally the painter Jane Benham Hay, with whom he had a son, painter Bernardo Hay. Among the pupils of Altamura was Vincenzo Acquaviva.

Francesco died in Naples. In 1901, a monument in his honor was erected in Foggia.
