= Konstantinos Volanakis =

Greek painter (c. 1837–1907)

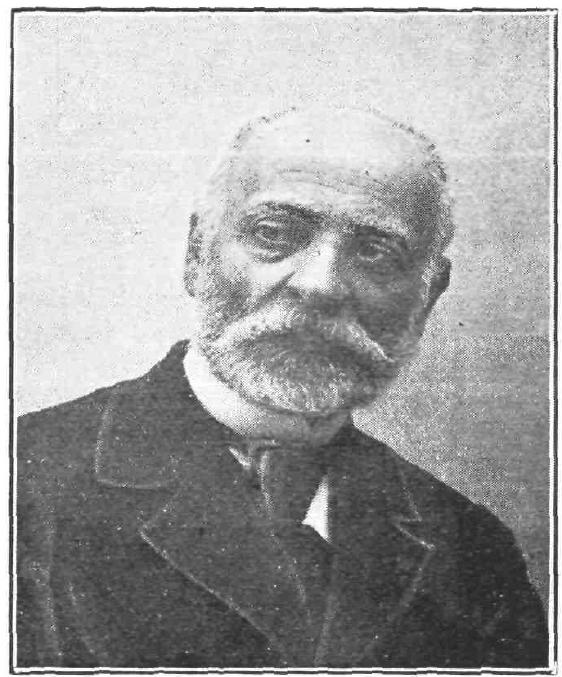
- Volanakis in 1902
- Born: 1837; Heraklion, Ottoman Empire
- Died: June 29, 1907; Piraeus, Greece
- Education: Academy of Fine Arts
- Occupation: painter
- Employer: Athens School of Fine Arts

Konstantinos Volanakis (Greek: Κωνσταντίνος Βολανάκης; c. 1837 - 29 June 1907) was a Greek painter. He is known as one of the greatest Greek seascape painters. Another notable seascape painter was Ioannis Altamouras.

== Biography ==
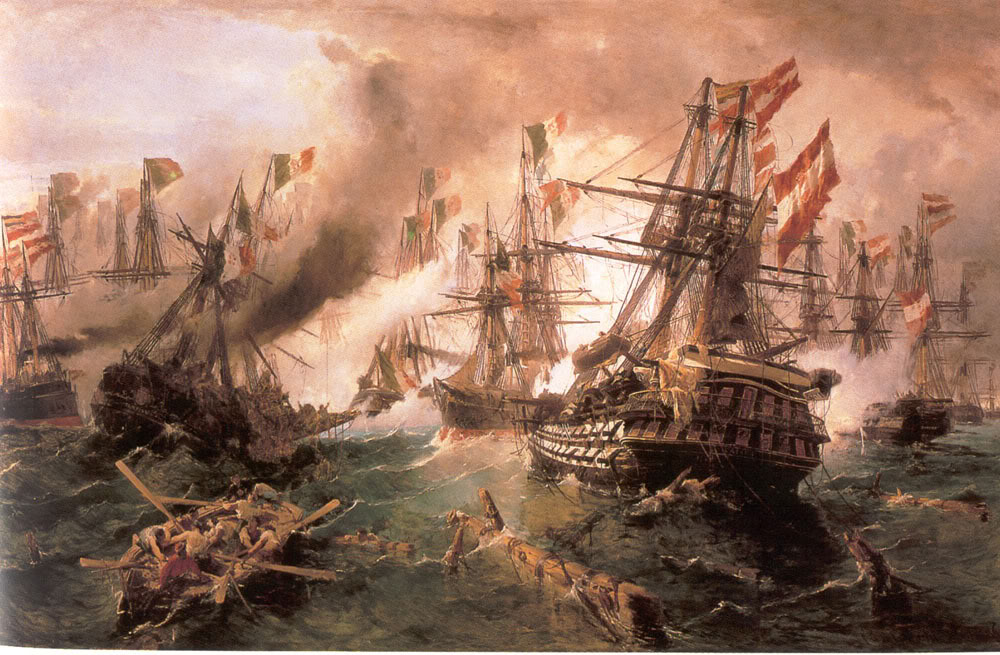
The Battle of Lissa (1869)

Volanakis was born at Heraklion on Crete, to parents who came from a small village near Rethymno. Later, they moved again for business reasons, and he completed his basic education on Syros in 1856. Afterward, urged on by his brothers, he went to Trieste and became a book-keeping clerk for a family of Greek merchants who were related to his family by marriage. While there, he made sketches of ships and harbors in his account books. Rather than dismiss him, the family recognized his artistic talent, and made arrangements for him to study at the Academy of Fine Arts, Munich, under Karl von Piloty, joining a group of Greek students that included Nikolaos Gyzis, Georgios Jakobides, Nikiphoros Lytras and Polychronis Lembesis. His instructors discouraged any sort of landscape painting, because it was "in decline", so he concentrated on portraits.

His break came in 1869, three years after the Battle of Lissa, when Emperor Franz Joseph held a drawing competition to memorialize the event. Volanakis won the contest, receiving 1000 gold Florins and free travel cruises with the Austrian navy for three years. He took full advantage of this, producing numerous canvases and sketches. In 1883, despite warnings from Gyzis that it would ruin his career, he returned to Greece and settled in Piraeus, where his family had a pottery factory, citing pressure from his wife, whose health was suffering from the cold winters in Germany.

From then until 1903, he was a teacher at the Athens School of Fine Arts, where one of his best-known students was Michalis Oikonomou. He also operated his own private school. Another of his pupils was Sophia Laskaridou In 1889, he was awarded the Silver Cross of the Order of the Redeemer. He was, however, very poor in his later years, due to his very large family and declining interest in his art. In an effort to increase his income, he reversed the usual method of painting first, then framing, by working with a group of framers who would make luxurious carved frames first, then creating paintings to fit them.

Volanakis died on 29 June 1907 at Piraeus, from complications related to a major hernia. His funeral fell on an important election day, so very few people attended. Volanakis' paintings are held in public and private collections such as the National Gallery of Greece, Aikaterini Laskaridis Foundation, and the Teloglion Fine Arts Foundation.

== Gallery ==
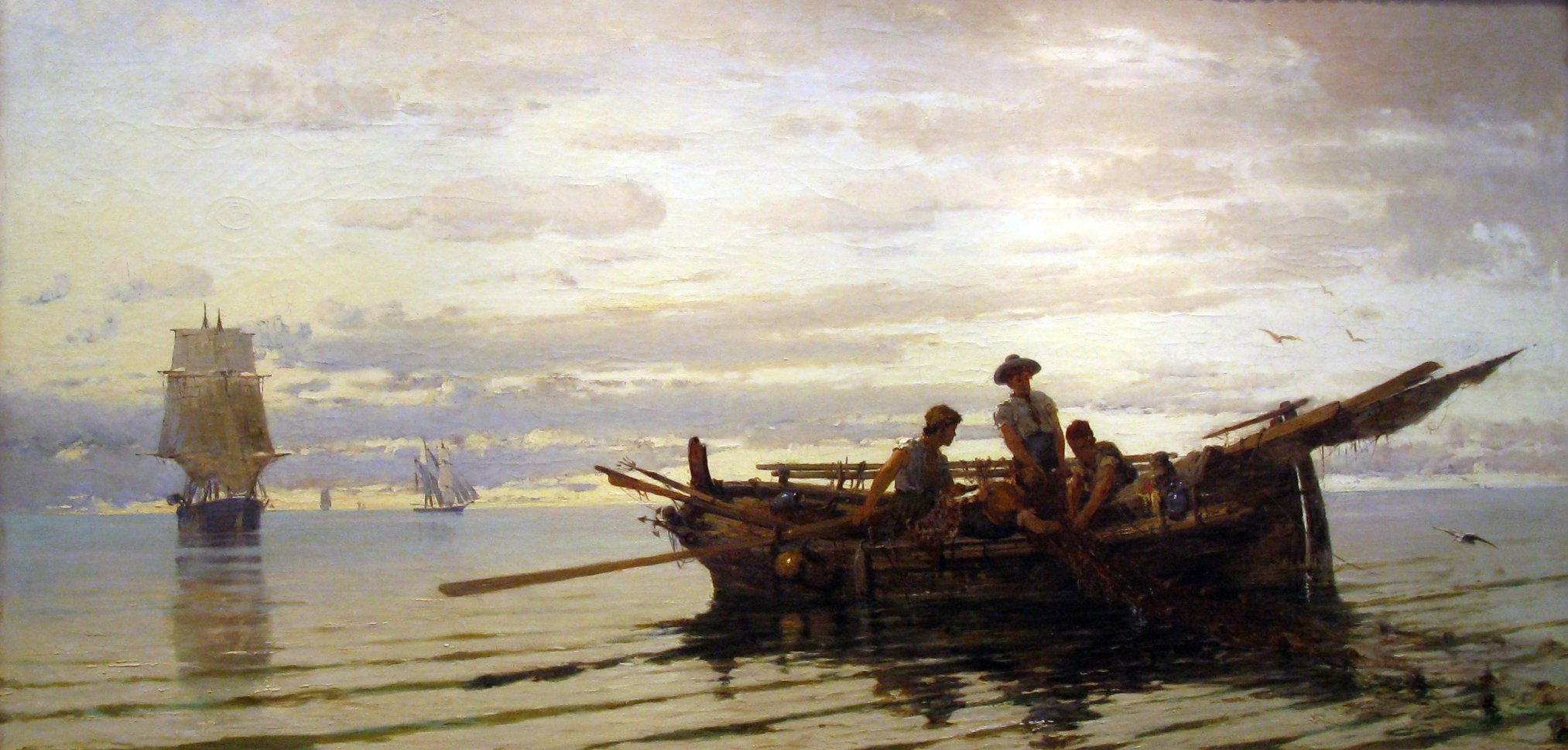
Collecting the Nets (1871)

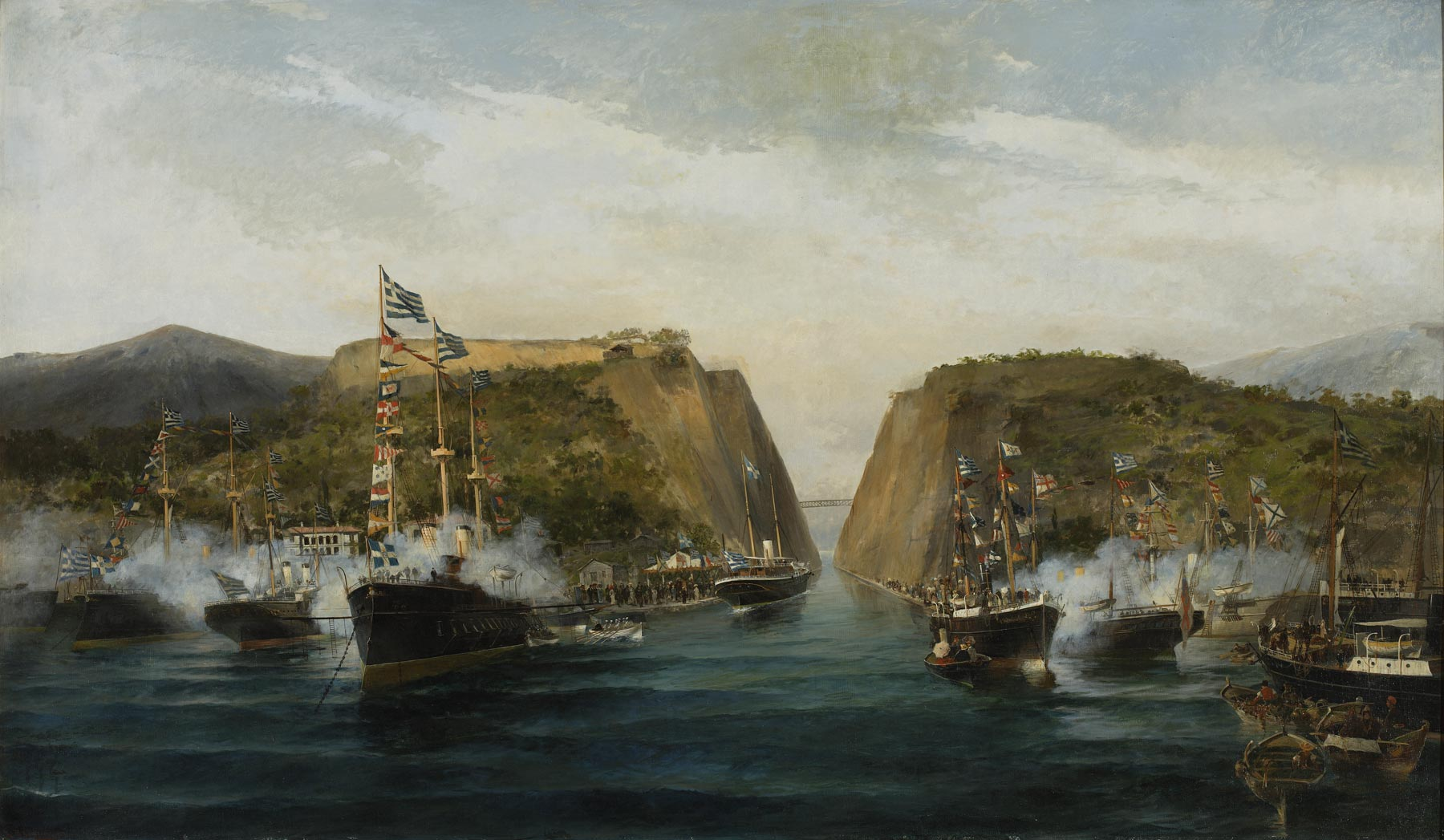
The Inauguration of the Corinth Canal (1893)

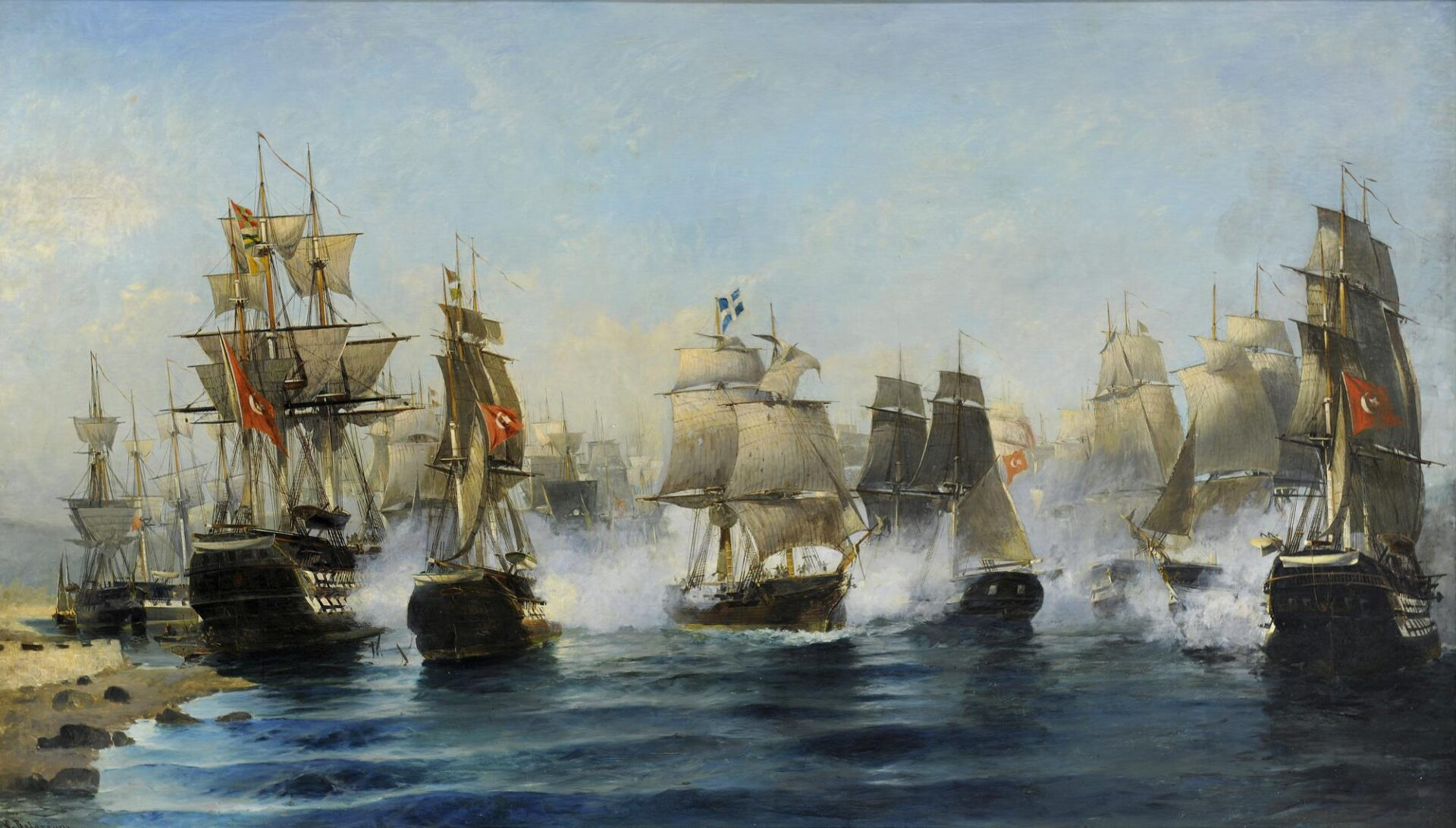
Sortie of the Aris (1894)

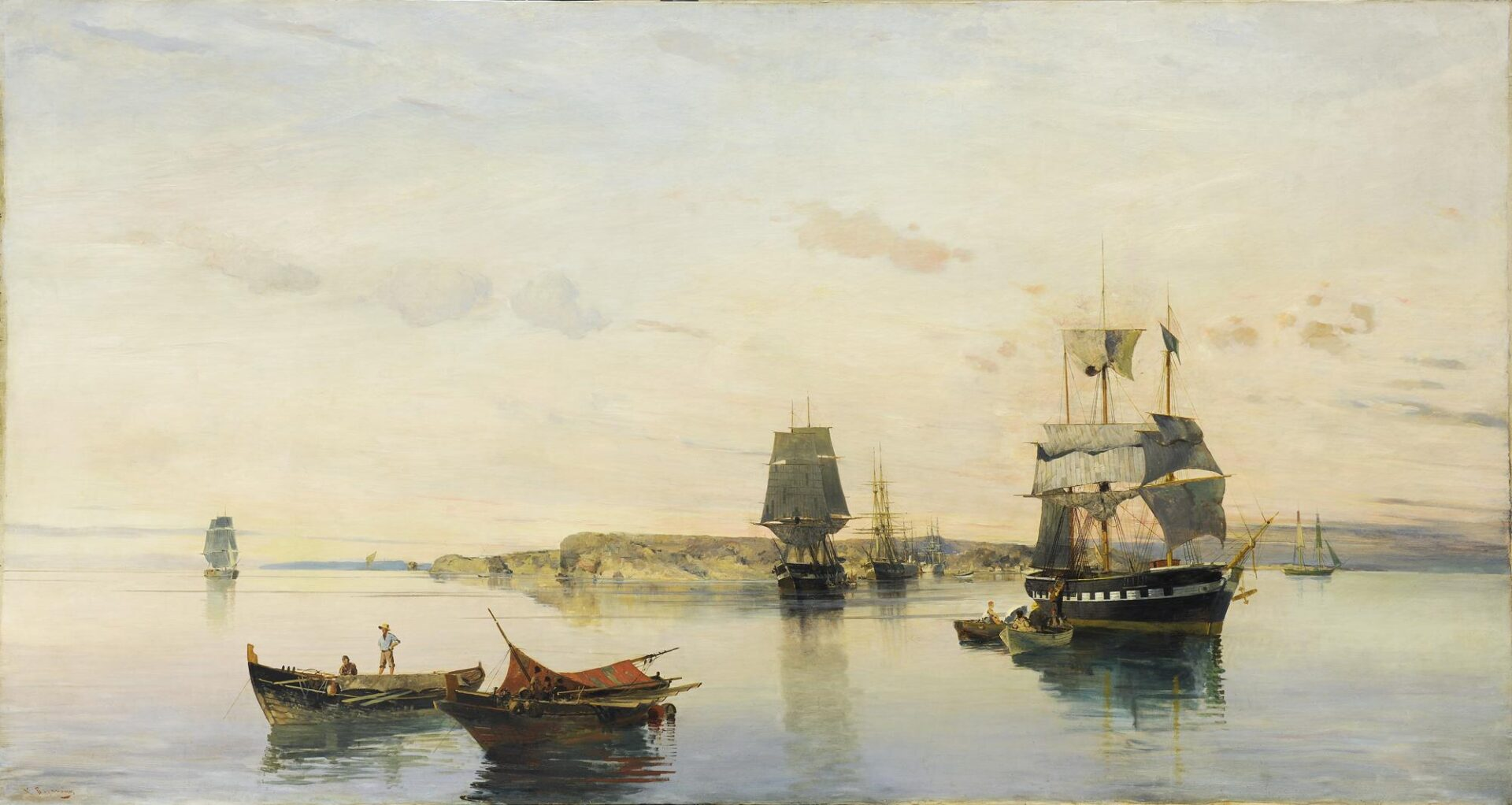
Anchored Boats (1895)

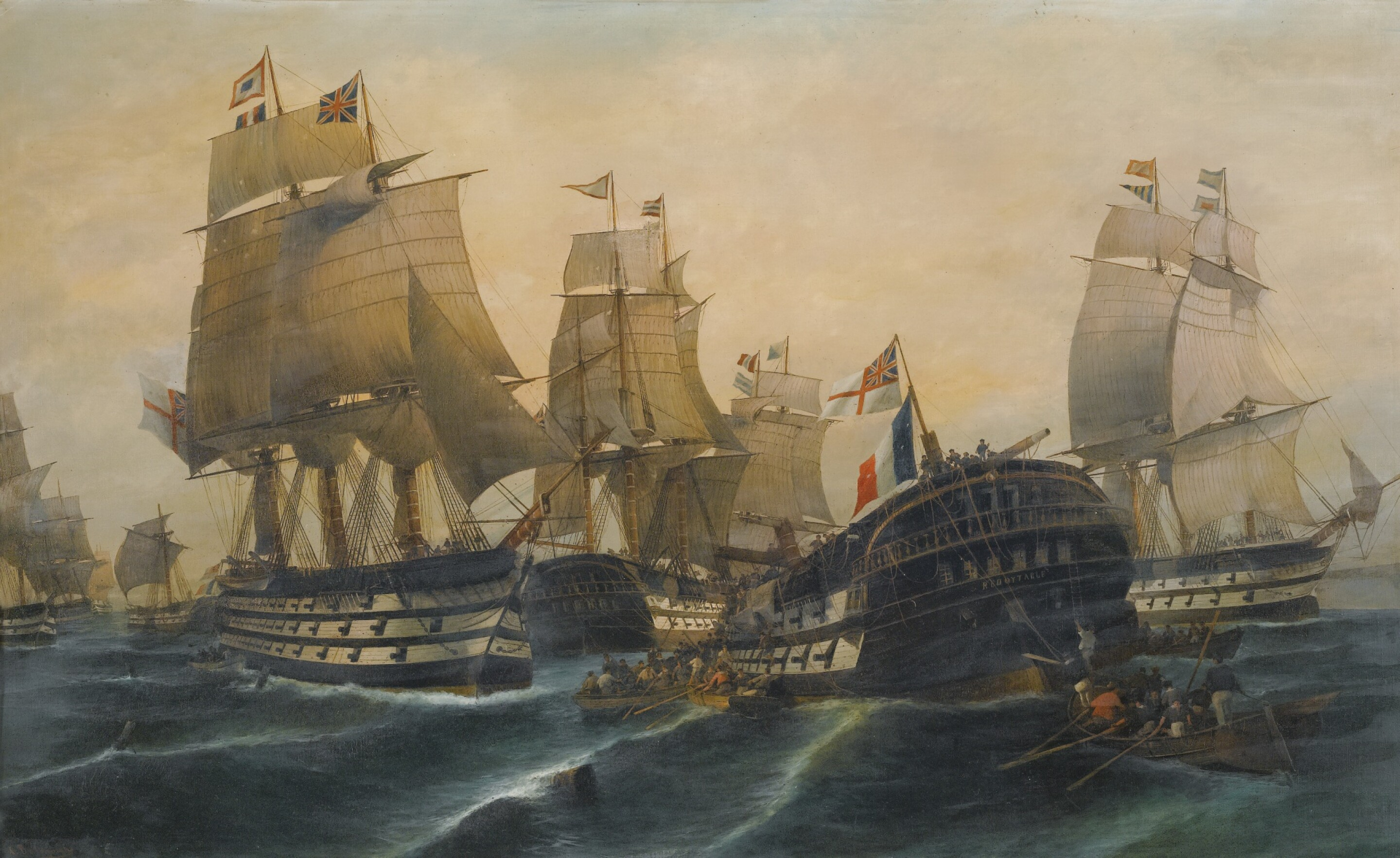
The Battle of Trafalgar (Unknown)
