= Sphacteria =

Small island in Greece, site of three battles

Native name: Σφακτηρία
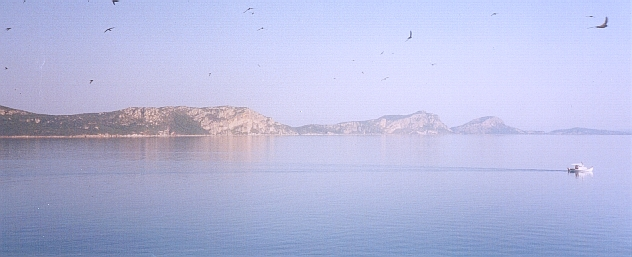
- Sphacteria from Pylos
- Interactive map of Sphacteria

Geography
- Coordinates: 36°55′48.49″N 21°39′56.61″E
- Area: 3.2 km^{2} (1.2 sq mi)

Administration
- Greece
- Region: Peloponnese
- Regional unit: Messenia

Demographics
- Population: 0 (2011)
- Pop. density: 0/km^{2} (0/sq mi)

Sphacteria (Greek: Σφακτηρία - Sfaktiria) also known as Sphagia (Σφαγία) is a small island at the entrance to the bay of Pylos in the Peloponnese, Greece. It was the site of three battles:

- the 425 BC Battle of Sphacteria in the Peloponnesian War.
- the 1825 AD Battle of Sphacteria in the Greek War of Independence from the Ottoman Empire
- the 1827 AD Battle of Navarino, also in the Greek War of Independence

The shipwreck of the Irenes Serenade took place near the island in 1980.
