= The Clifton Racecourse =

Painting by Rolinda Sharples

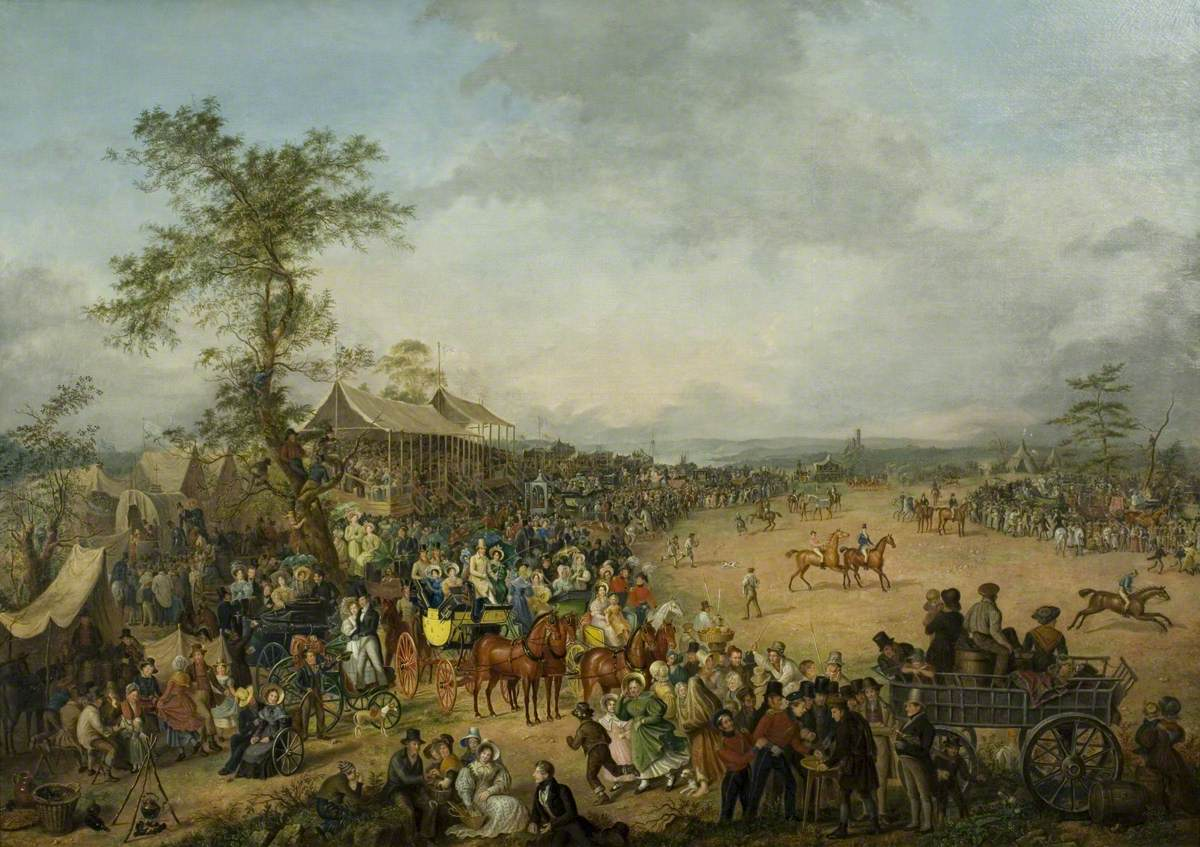
- Artist: Rolinda Sharples
- Year: 1836
- Type: Oil on canvas, genre painting
- Dimensions: 110.4 cm × 157.4 cm (43.5 in × 62.0 in)
- Location: City Museum and Art Gallery; Bristol

The Clifton Racecourse is an 1836 genre painting by the British artist Rolinda Sharples. It shows a horseracing meeting taking place at Durdham Down near Clifton.

The Bath-born Sharples was active in the port city of Bristol during the Regency era, although she was not a member of the Bristol School active at the same time. She had produced the notable depiction of fashionable Regency Bristol in her 1818 painting The Cloakroom, Clifton Assembly Rooms. This view of the race meeting was both her most complex work and her last work before her death at an early age. The painting is now in the collection of the City Museum and Art Gallery in Bristol, having been purchased in 1931.

== Bibliography ==
- Carter, Julia. Bristol Museum and Art Gallery: Guide to the Art Collection. Bristol Books, 2017.
- Johnson, Edward Dudley Hume. Paintings of the British Social Scene: From Hogarth to Sickert. Weidenfeld and Nicolson, 1986
- Samson, John. Public View; A Profile of the Royal West of England Academy. Redcliffe, 2002.
