= The Artist and her Mother =

Painting by Rolinda Sharples

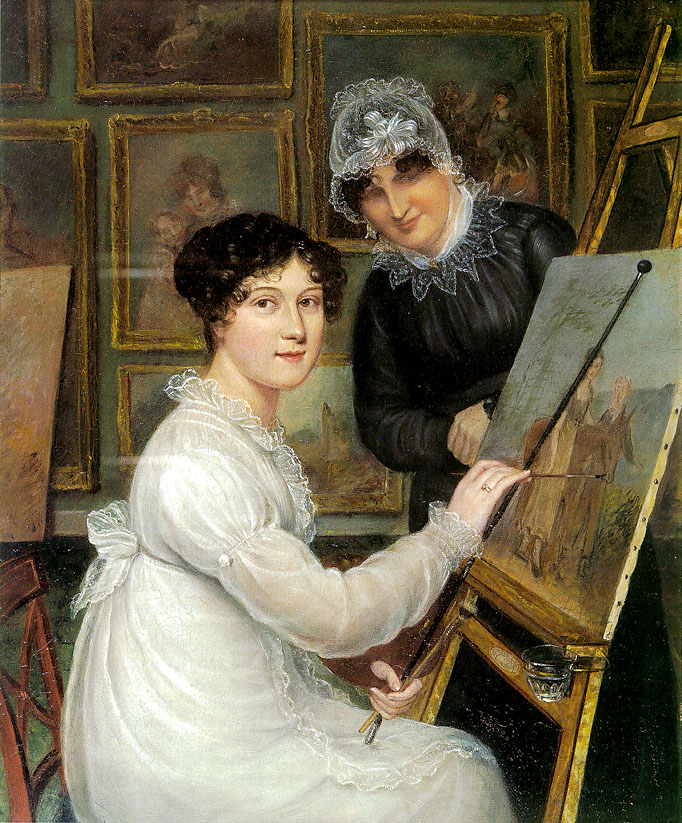
- Artist: Rolinda Sharples
- Year: 1816
- Type: Oil on panel, portrait painting
- Dimensions: 36.8 cm × 29.2 cm (14.5 in × 11.5 in)
- Location: City Museum and Art Gallery; Bristol

The Artist and her Mother is an oil on canvas portrait painting by the British artist Rolinda Sharples, from 1816. It features a self portrait of the artist with her mother Ellen Sharples, also a painter. Both women were Bath-born Bristol-based artists. Rolinda is one of the members of the loose Bristol School grouping and is known for her portrayals of Regency era life. She is shown in her studio at an easel working on a canvas.

Today the painting is in the collection of the City Museum and Art Gallery in Bristol, having been acquired in 1931.

== Bibliography ==
- Sanson, John. Public View: A Profile of the Royal West of England Academy. Redcliffe, 2002.
