= Dog Tired (painting) =

Painting by C.R.W. Nevinson

- Artist: C.R.W. Nevinson
- Year: 1916
- Type: Oil on canvas, war art
- Dimensions: 76.2 cm × 64.8 cm (30.0 in × 25.5 in)
- Location: City Museum and Art Gallery, Bristol

Dog Tired is a 1916 oil painting by the British artist C. R. W. Nevinson. It features a scene inspired by the trench warfare of the First World War. A group of exhausted British Army soldiers are shown catching a brief moment of sleep. Nevinson used the zigzagging angles of Futurism to convey the strain of warfare. The painting is in the collection of the City Museum and Art Gallery in Bristol, having been purchased in 1954.

== Bibliography ==
- Carter, Julia. Bristol Museum and Art Gallery: Guide to the Art Collection. Bristol Books, 2017.
- Gough, Paul. A Terrible Beauty: British Artists in the First World War. Sansom, 2010.
- Ingleby, Richard. C.R.W. Nevinson: The Twentieth Century. Merrell Holberton, 1999.
- Jeffrey, Keith. 1916: A Global History. Bloomsbury Publishing, 2015.
