= Rolinda Sharples =

English painter (1793–1838)

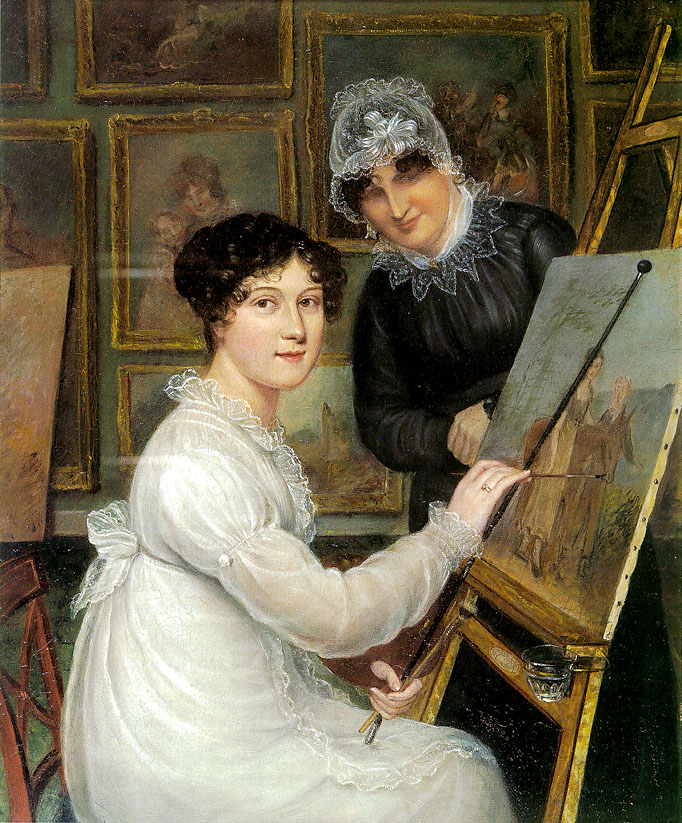
- The Artist and her Mother. Self-portrait by Rolinda Sharples, with her mother, Ellen, in the background, 1816
- Born: 1793; Bath, England
- Died: 1838 (aged 44–45); Bristol
- Known for: Painting,
- Notable work: The Cloak Room, Clifton Assembly Rooms c 1817–18, The Stoppage of the Bank, 1831
- Movement: Portrait, Genre, History

Rolinda Sharples (1793–1838) was an English painter who specialised in portraits and genre paintings in oil. She exhibited at the Royal Academy and at the Society of British Artists, where she became an honorary member.

== Biography ==
Rolinda Sharples was born into a family of artists headed by James Sharples, her father, and Ellen Sharples, her mother who had studied under her husband and continued to assist James in his studio after their marriage. Ellen Sharples not only made copies of her husband's better known compositions but she additionally received requests for her own work. Rolinda's three brothers also pursued careers in art. They were: George, from her father's first marriage; Felix, from his second marriage; and James Jr., who was Rolinda's full brother and son to Ellen, James's third wife. She was only an infant when her parents moved to America in 1793. Rolinda spent two periods in America, the first between 1793 and 1801 and the second from 1809 to 1811. In 1803, Rolinda's mother, a miniature portrait painter, began to encourage her daughter to take an interest in the profession. She taught Rolinda drawing, paying her small sums of money to encourage her. By the time Rolinda was 13 years old, she had joined the family business, which consisted of creating small scale pastel portraits of famous people, copying them and selling them for a profit. Along with her two brothers and mother, she began copying miniature portraits from her father's original paintings.

After her father's death in New York in 1811, Rolinda returned to Bristol with her mother and brother. She branched out from painting small portraits, to earning her living painting portraits in oil, and more ambitious genre and contemporary history paintings that depicted groups of people. During this time, her mother Ellen's diaries shifted their focus to Rolinda's progress as an artist. In 1812, Ellen wrote of her daughter: "Rolinda commenced oil painting on the 21, & has since applied with great ardour, continuing other studies, & having lessons in music, practising &c." Soon thereafter in 1813, Ellen notes that she "sat for my picture to Rolinda in oil colours as large as life, kit kat size, the first portrait she painted in oil." Rolinda painted her mother several times. At the end of 1813, she painted a large as life portrait, having, as her mother observed, "much improved in painting and become discontented with the portrait executed in Jan. 7." In 1814, Rolinda painted a self-portrait, and in 1815 she completed a double portrait entitled The Artist and Her Mother. A signature device of the artist was to paint herself into the background of many of her works, often pictured with a wry smile, gazing directly into the eyes of the observer.

Rolinda was elected an honorary member of the Society of British Artists in 1827. Rolinda was one of the first female British artists to tackle multi-figure compositions. Her group paintings were as meticulous in detail as the small portraits she once painted, and today her scenes of Regency Bristol are considered to be accurate social records of the period. Her major paintings include The Cloak Room, Clifton Assembly Rooms; Racing on the Downs; Rownham Ferry with Portraits; The Stoppage of the Bank; and The Trial of Colonel Brereton after the Bristol riots of 1831. Rolinda also painted smaller, more intimate studies from nature – of shells, or of a little mouse – which she exhibited.

Rolinda's paintings were included in exhibitions in Bristol, Leeds, Birmingham, and Carlisle, and with the Royal Academy and the Society of British Artists in London. For the last eight years of her life she lived with her mother in Hotwells area of Bristol, and died of breast cancer in 1838. Many of her paintings are now in the Bristol City Museum and Art Gallery.

== Personal papers ==
Letters, legal papers, bank and account books relating to the family of Rolinda Sharples are held at Bristol Archives (Ref. 15395) (online catalogue).

== The Cloakroom, Clifton Assembly Rooms, 1818 ==
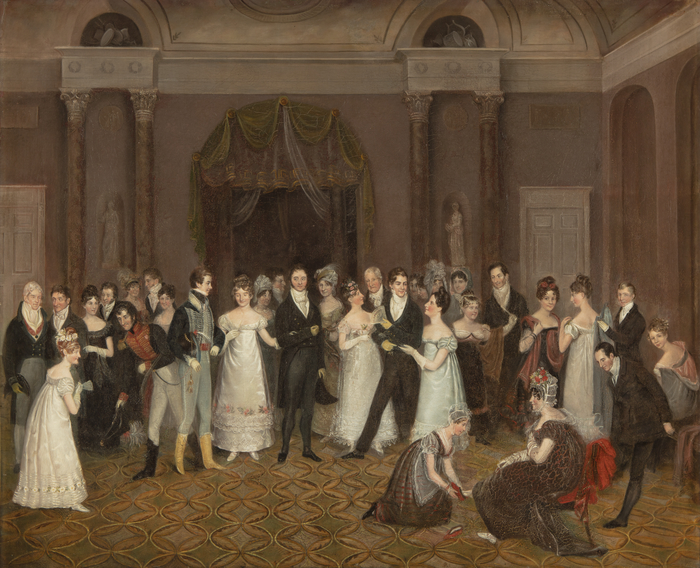
The Cloakroom, Clifton Assembly Rooms, 1818

This painting, which is on display in the Bristol Museum and Art Gallery, has become one of Rolinda's most recognisable images for fans of Jane Austen and the British Regency. The image has been used for numerous books, most notably A Portrait of Jane Austen, by David Cecil, Jane Austen's World, by Maggie Lane, and High Society, by Venetia Murray. One reason for its popular use might be that only a few Georgian paintings exist today that depict assemblies in progress, with people dancing or moving around. Rolinda's painting shows a group in the cloakroom preparing for the evening. The Clifton Assembly Rooms still survive to this day.

== Royal Academy paintings ==
The listing in a book of The Royal Academy Exhibitors, shows that she exhibited her works in 1820, 1822, and 1824.

- 1820 – Shells; Eliza at Work, A Market, Portrait of a Lady
- 1822 – Rownham Ferry With Portraits, The Young Delinquent
- 1824 – A mouse

== Gallery ==
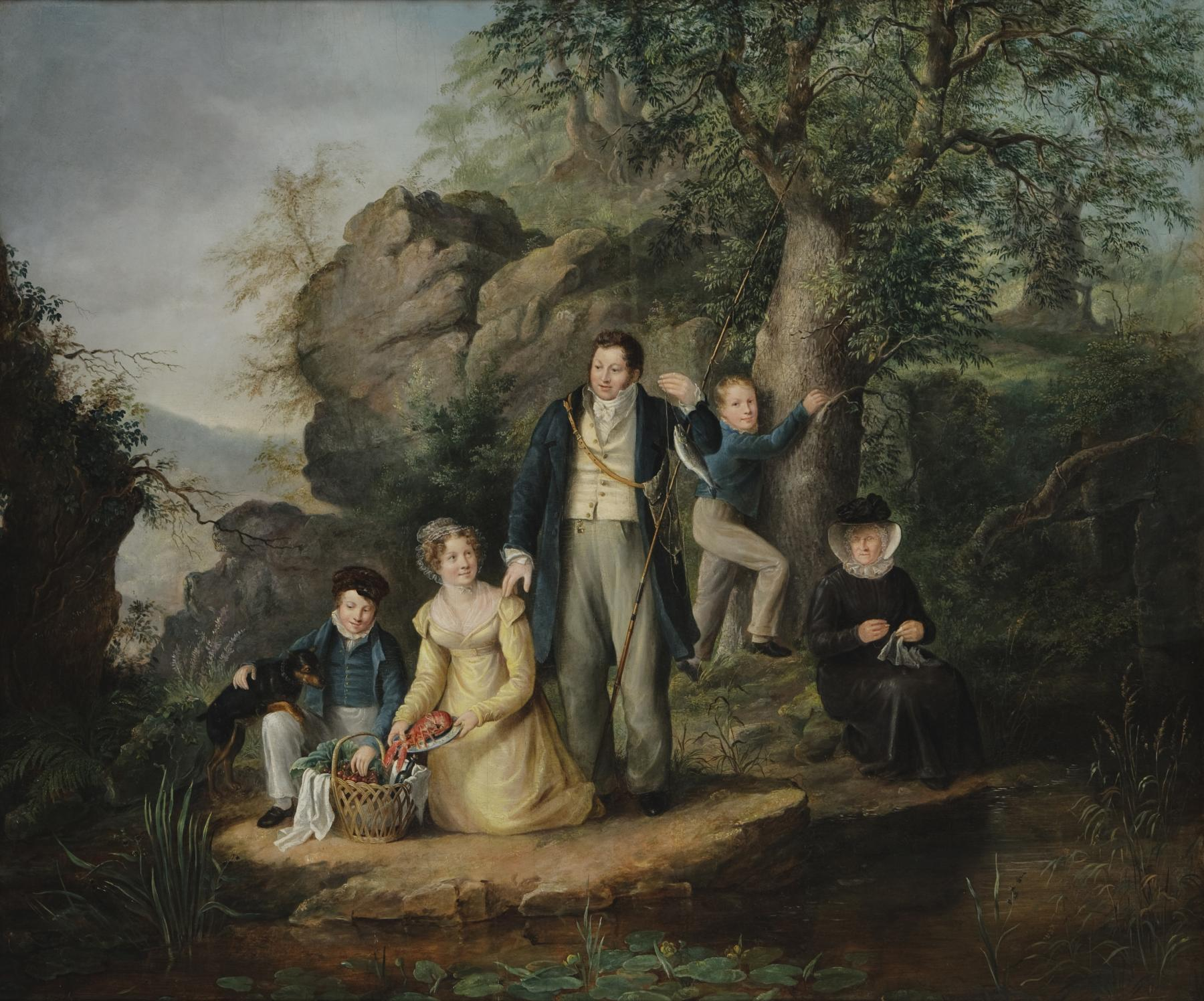
Picnic in England, 1825

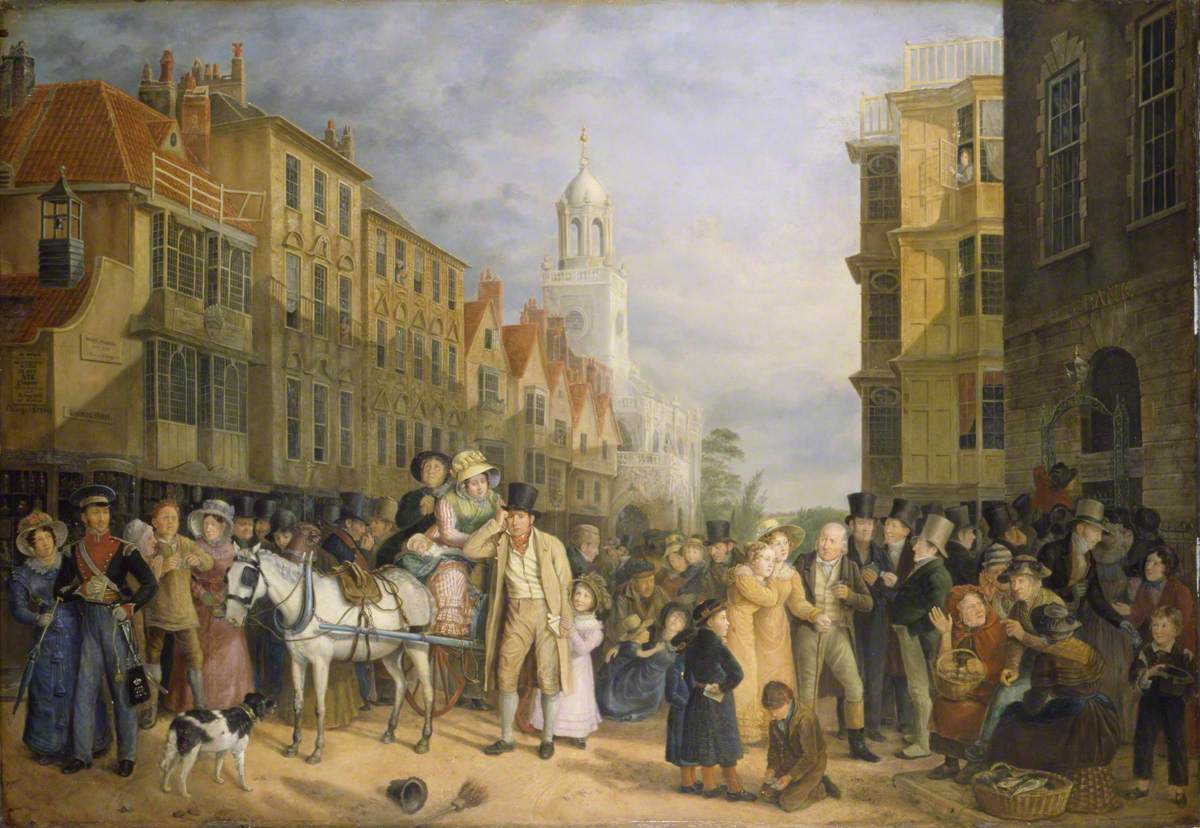
The Stoppage of the Bank, c. 1825

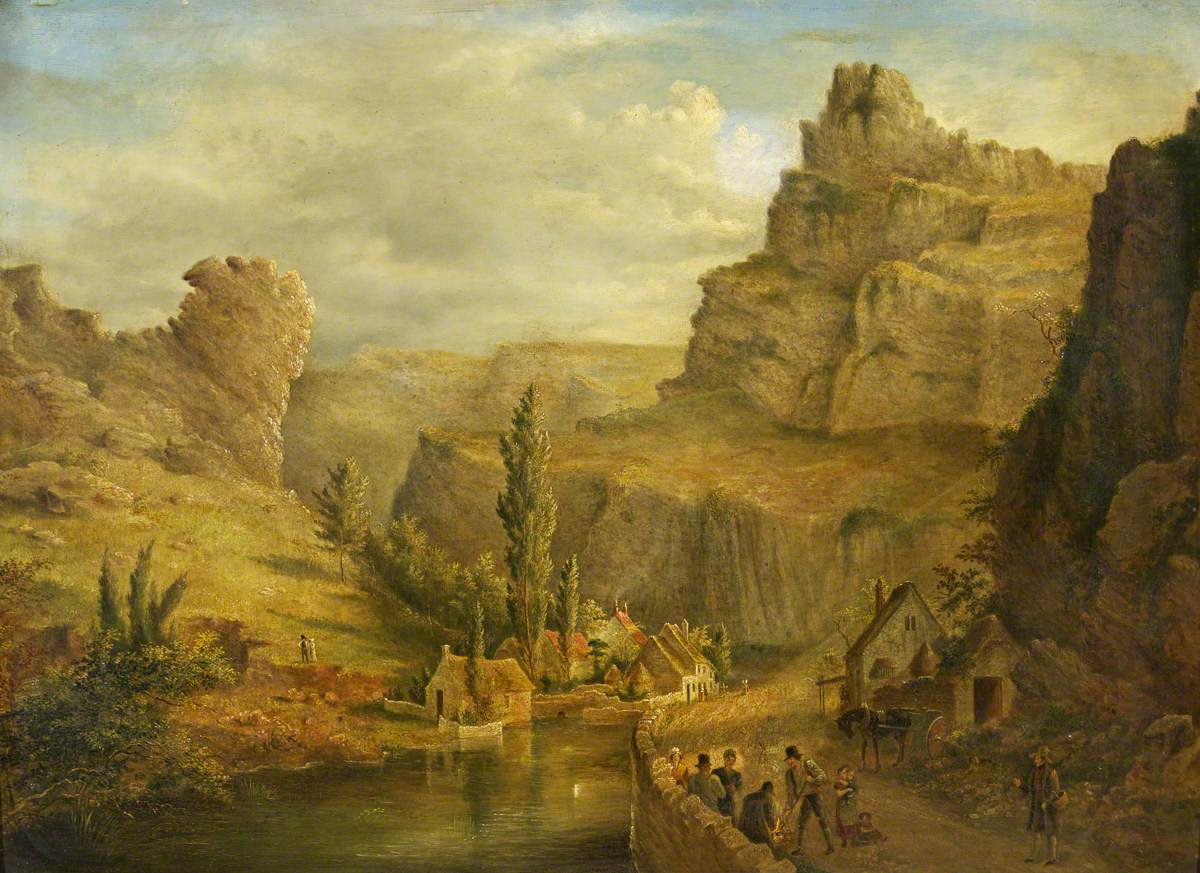
Cheddar, 1828

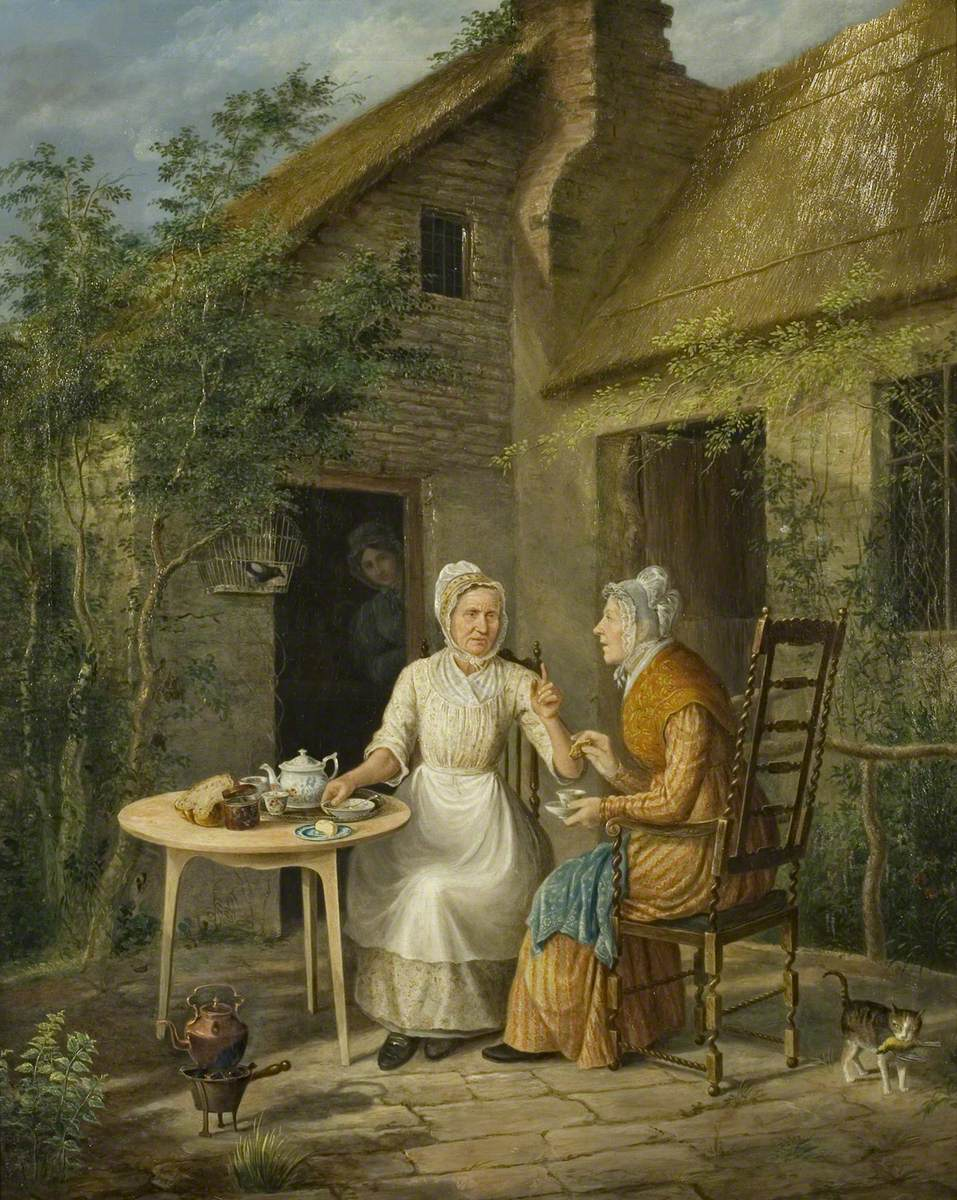
Village Gossips, 1828

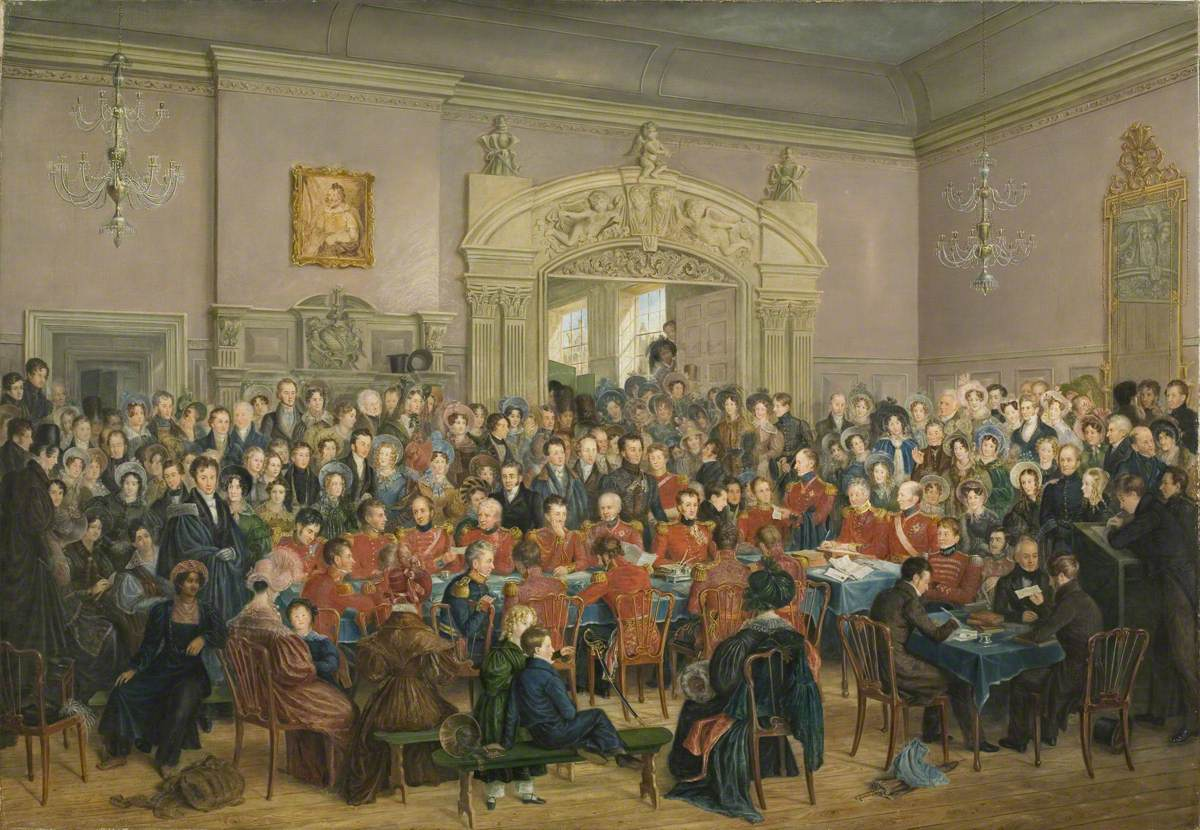
The Trial of Colonel Brereton, 1831

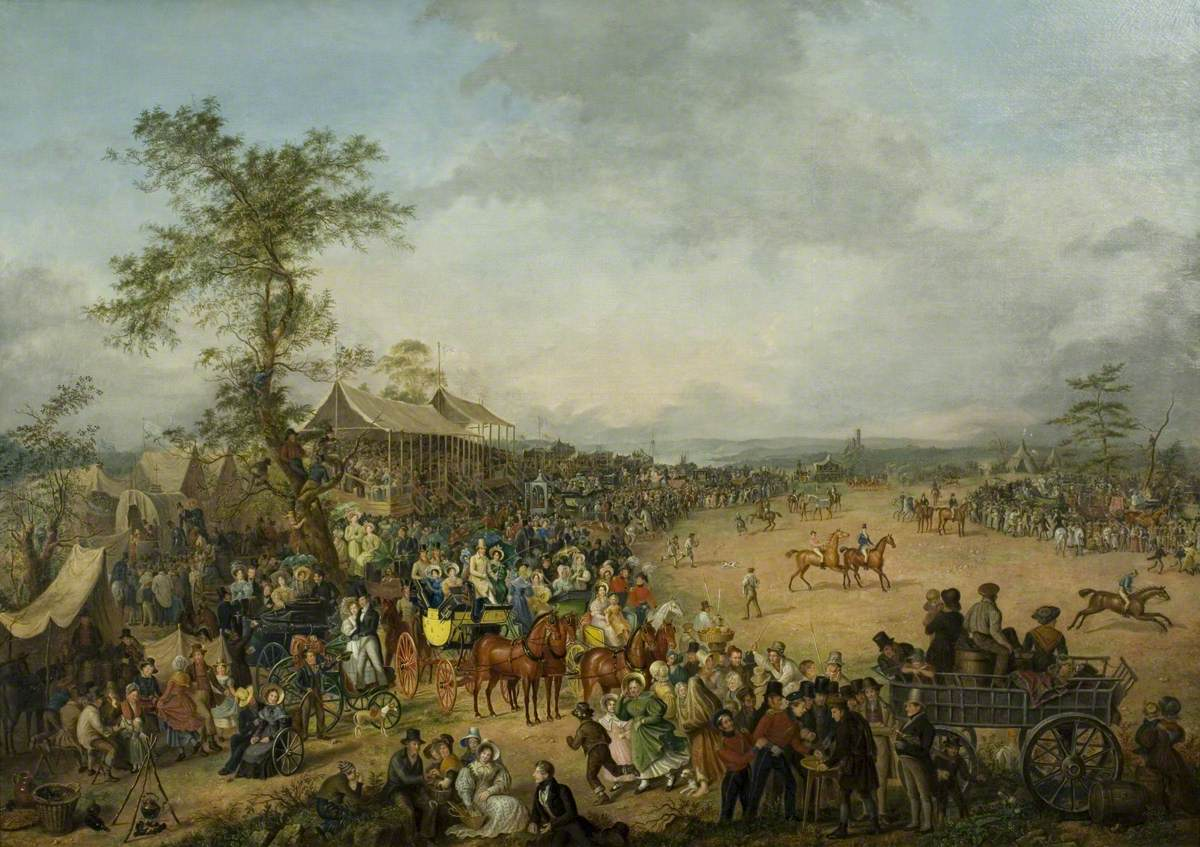
The Clifton Racecourse, 1836
