= The Farewells =

Painting by James Tissot

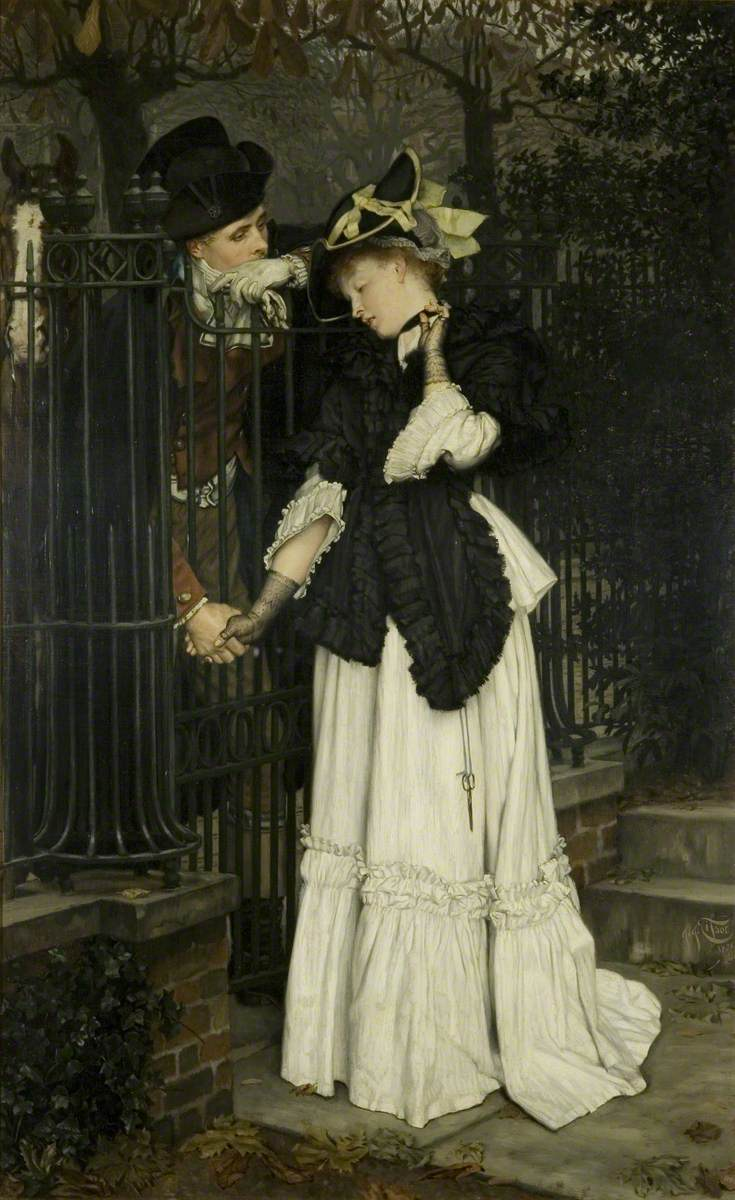
- Artist: James Tissot
- Year: 1871
- Type: Oil on canvas, genre painting
- Dimensions: 100.3 cm × 62.5 cm (39.5 in × 24.6 in)
- Location: Museum and Art Gallery, Bristol

The Farewells (French: Les Adieux) is an oil on canvas genre painting by the French artist James Tissot, from 1871.

== History and description ==
It depicts a young couple reluctantly saying their goodbyes through an iron gate and railings as they are holding hands. They are dressed in a very fashionale way. The young girl seems nostalgic as she bids farewell to her beloved. The scissors hanging from the lady's waist also allude to the separation, seemingly imposed. It was one of the first paintings Tissot produced following his move to London, after his departure from Paris in the wake of the Franco-Prussian War.

The work was displayed at the Royal Academy Exhibition of 1872 at the National Gallery along with An Interesting Story. It became well-known through an engraving produced in 1873 by Joel Ballin. The painting is in the Museum and Art Gallery, in Bristol, having been purchased in 1955.

== Bibliography ==
- Angiuli, Emanuela & Spurrell, Katy. De Nittis e Tissot: pittori della vita moderna. Skira, 2006.
- Marshall, Nancy Rose & Warner, Malcolm. James Tissot: Victorian Life, Modern Love. Yale University Press, 1999.
