= The Cloakroom, Clifton Assembly Rooms =

Painting by Rolinda Sharples

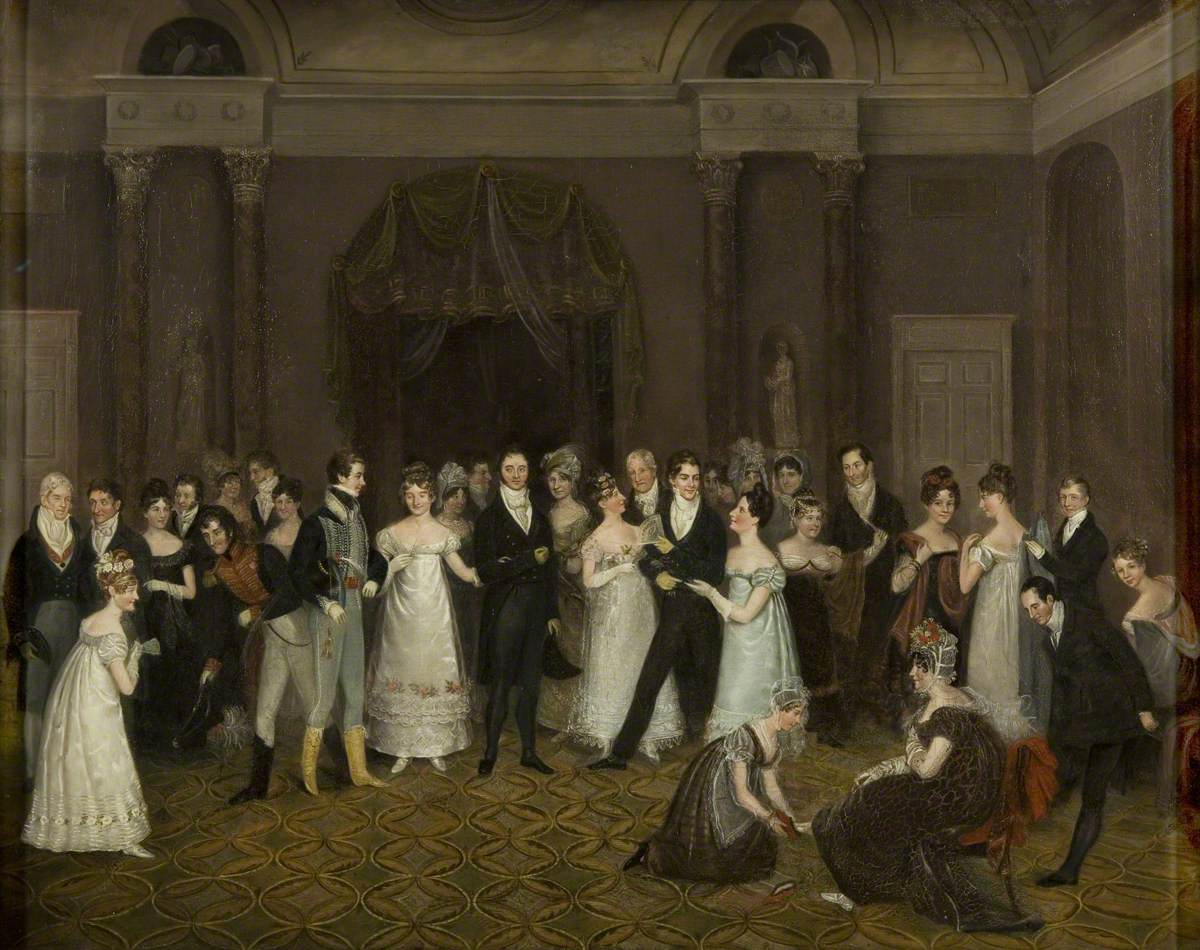
- Artist: Rolinda Sharples
- Year: 1818
- Type: Oil on canvas, genre painting
- Dimensions: 73 cm × 88.2 cm (29 in × 34.7 in)
- Location: City Museum and Art Gallery; Bristol

The Cloakroom, Clifton Assembly Rooms is an 1818 genre painting by the British artist Rolinda Sharples. Foster p. 36 It depicts the cloakroom of the Clifton Assembly Rooms during a ball. Clifton was a fashionable suburb of the port city of Bristol during the Regency era and the Assembly Rooms had opened in 1811. It was the first group painting the artist produced.

Loosely connected to the Bristol School of artists, the Bath-born Sharples produced a number of genre works. The image has become a popular one for illustrating the Regency era. Today the painting is in the collection of the City Museum and Art Gallery in Bristol, having been acquired in 1931.

The painting has been used as the cover of several Jane Austen novels and books of her works, including some publications of Pride and Prejudice, and Jane Austen: The World of Her Novels by Deirdre Le Faye.

== Bibliography ==
- Carter, Julia. Bristol Museum and Art Gallery: Guide to the Art Collection. Bristol Books, 2017.
- Davidson, Hilary. Dress in the Age of Jane Austen: Regency Fashion. Yale University Press, 2019.
- Foster, Vanda. The Nineteenth Century. Batsford, 1984.
