= Bristol Museum & Art Gallery =

Museum in Bristol, England

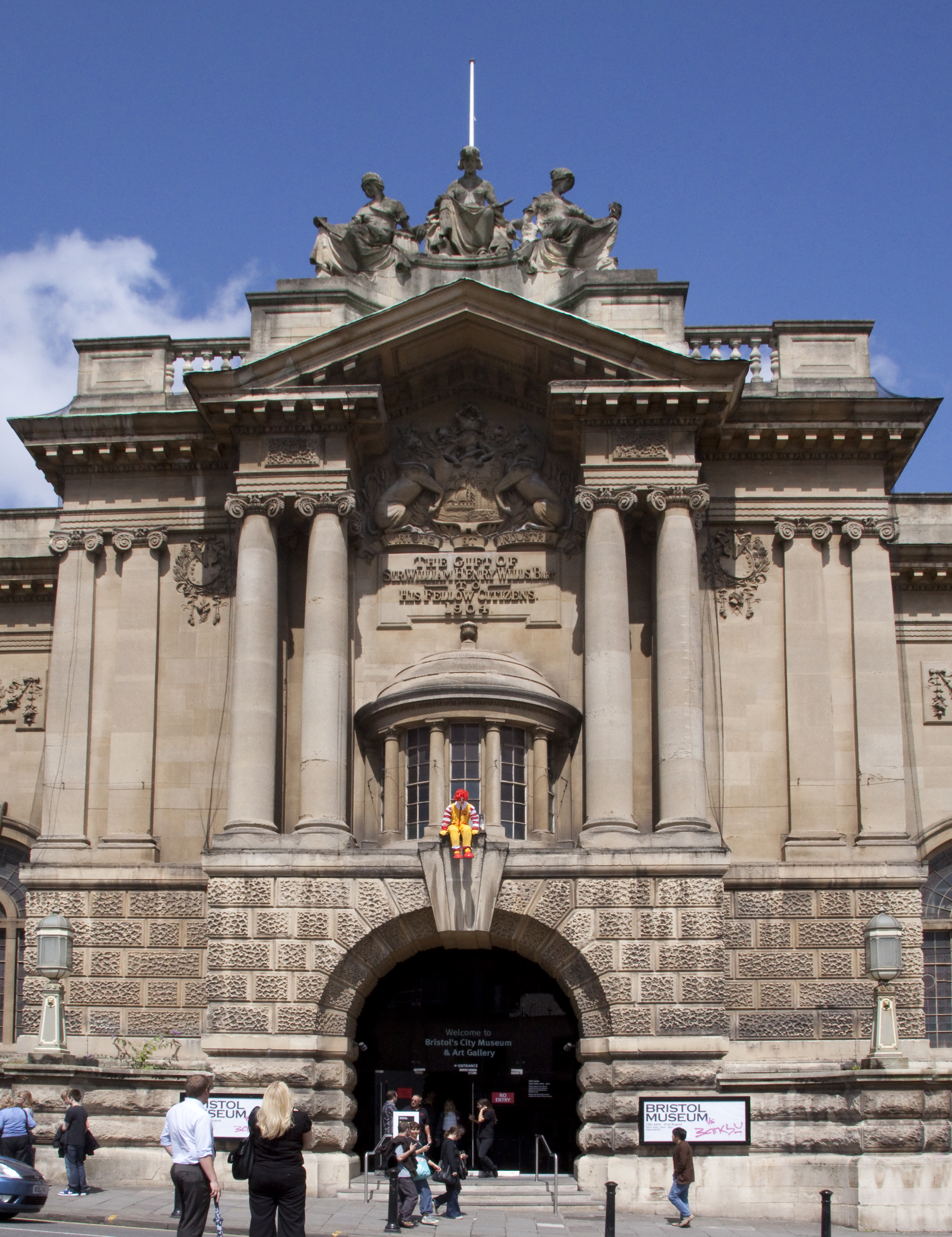

- Location within Bristol
- Established: 1823
- Location: Queens Road, Bristol BS8 1RL, England, United Kingdom
- Coordinates: 51.4561°N 2.6053°W
- Visitors: 467,608 (2015/16)* Ranked 23rd nationally
- Director: Jon Finch
- Website: Bristol Museum & Art Gallery

Listed Building – Grade II*
- Official name: City museum and art gallery and attached front walls
- Designated: 1 November 1966
- Reference no.: 1202478

Bristol Museum & Art Gallery is a large museum and art gallery in Bristol, England. The museum is situated in Clifton, about 0.5 miles (0.8 km) from the city centre. As part of Bristol Culture and Creative Industries it is run by Bristol City Council with no entrance fee.

The museum holds designated museum status, granted by the national government to protect outstanding museums. The designated collections include: geology, Eastern art, and Bristol's history, including English delftware.

The museum includes sections on natural history as well as local, national and international archaeology. The art gallery contains works from all periods, including many by internationally famous artists, as well a collection of modern paintings of Bristol.

In the summer of 2009 the museum hosted an exhibition by Banksy featuring more than 70 works of art, including animatronics and installations and was his largest exhibition. It was developed in secrecy and with no advance publicity, but soon gained worldwide attention.

The building is of Edwardian Baroque architecture and has been designated by English Heritage as a Grade II* listed building.

== History ==
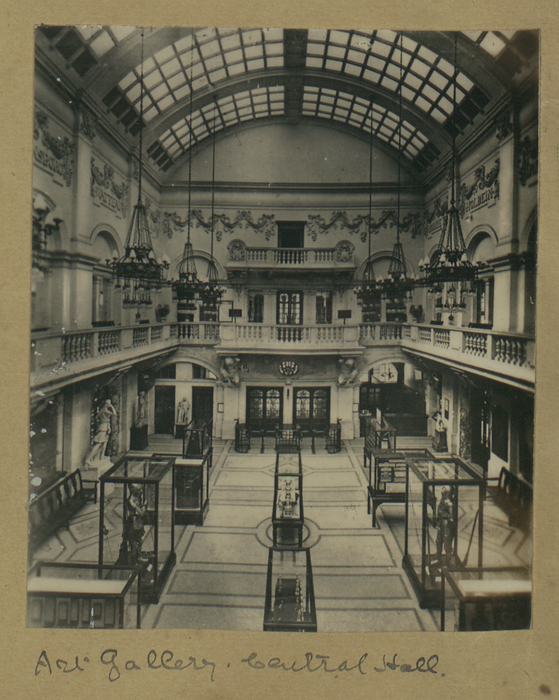
Bristol Museum entrance, 1904

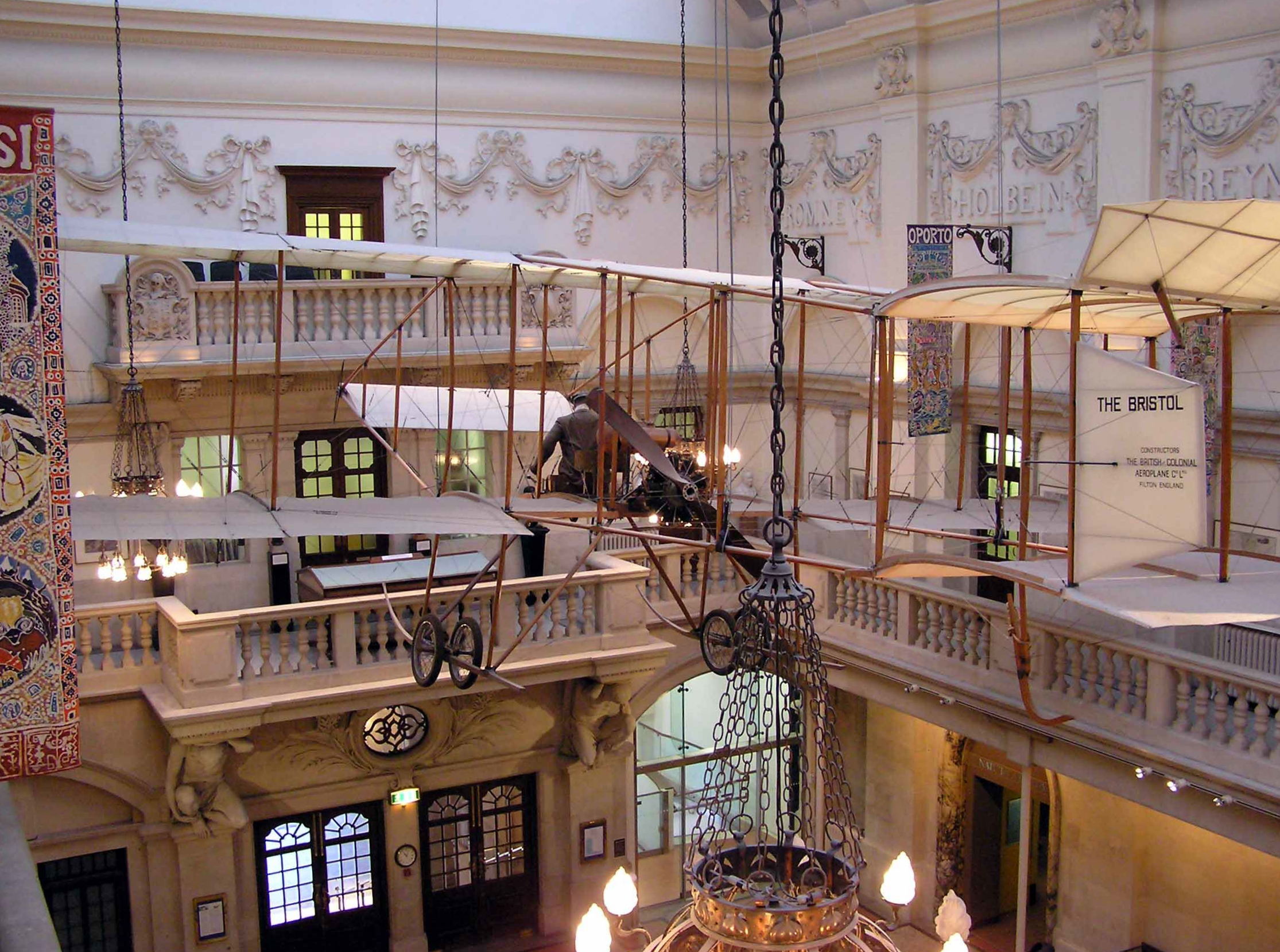
A Bristol Biplane replica hangs from the ceiling of the main hall of the Museum. This aircraft was made in 1963 for the film Those Magnificent Men in their Flying Machines.

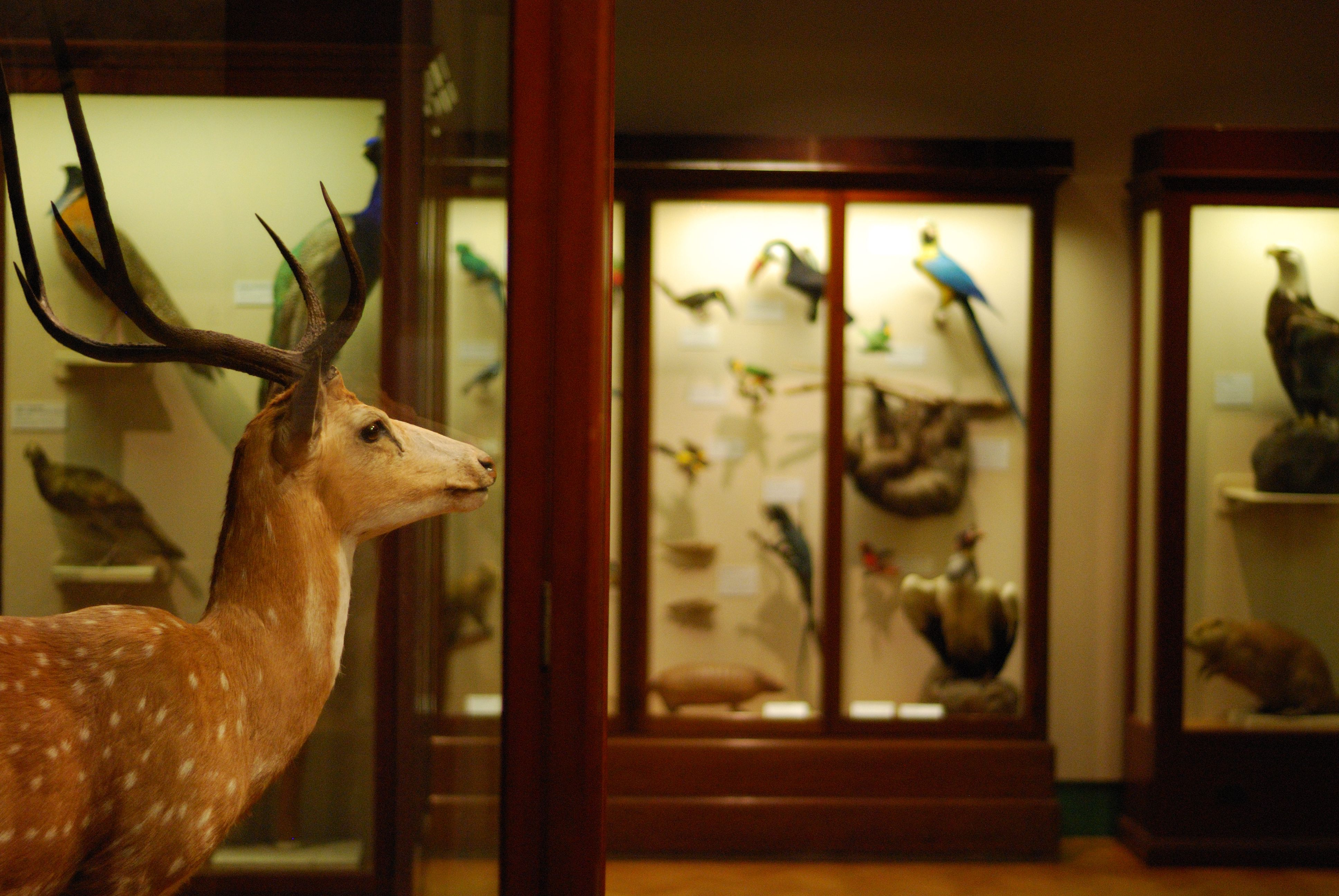
The museum's natural history galleries include a large selection of taxidermied animals

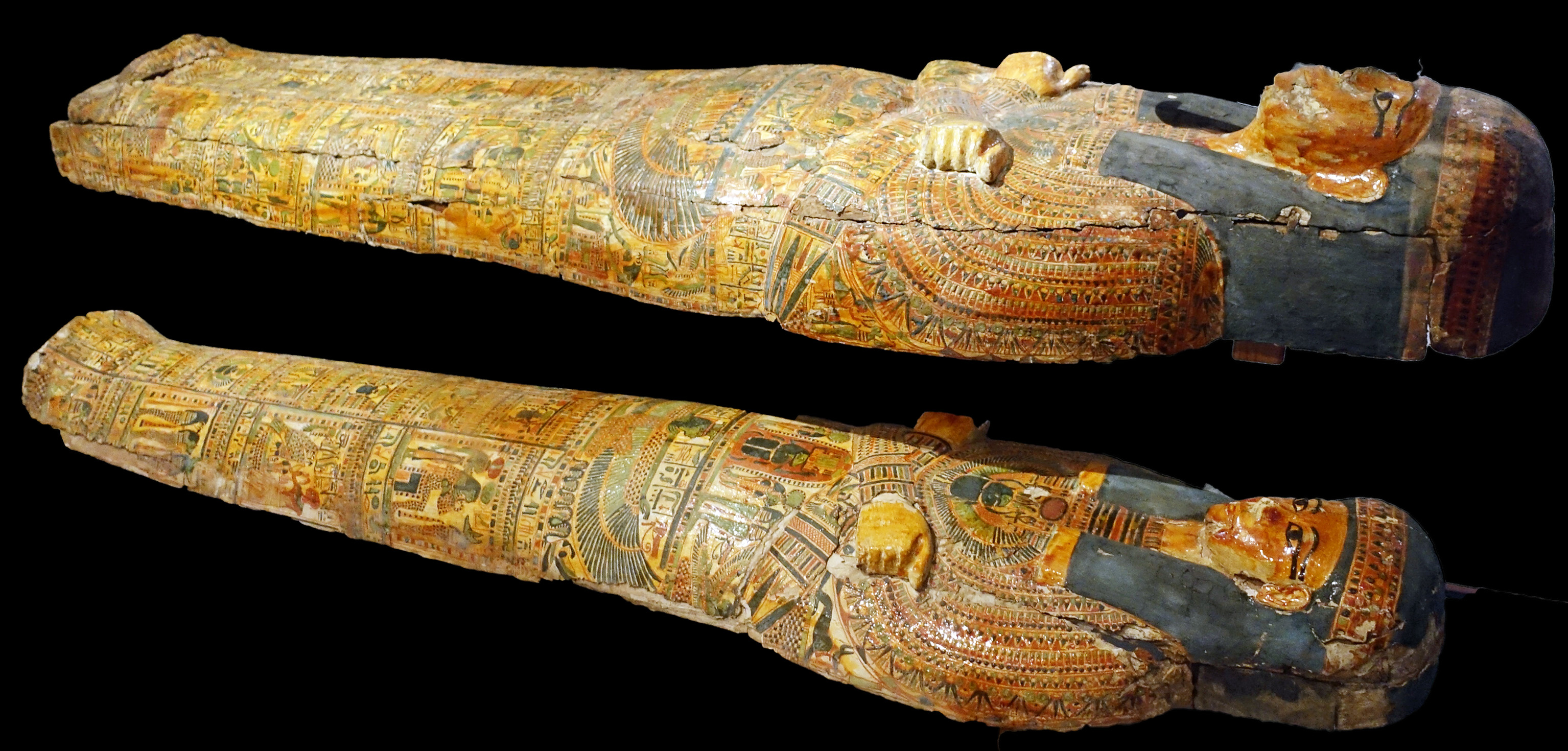
Sarcophagi in the Egyptology collections

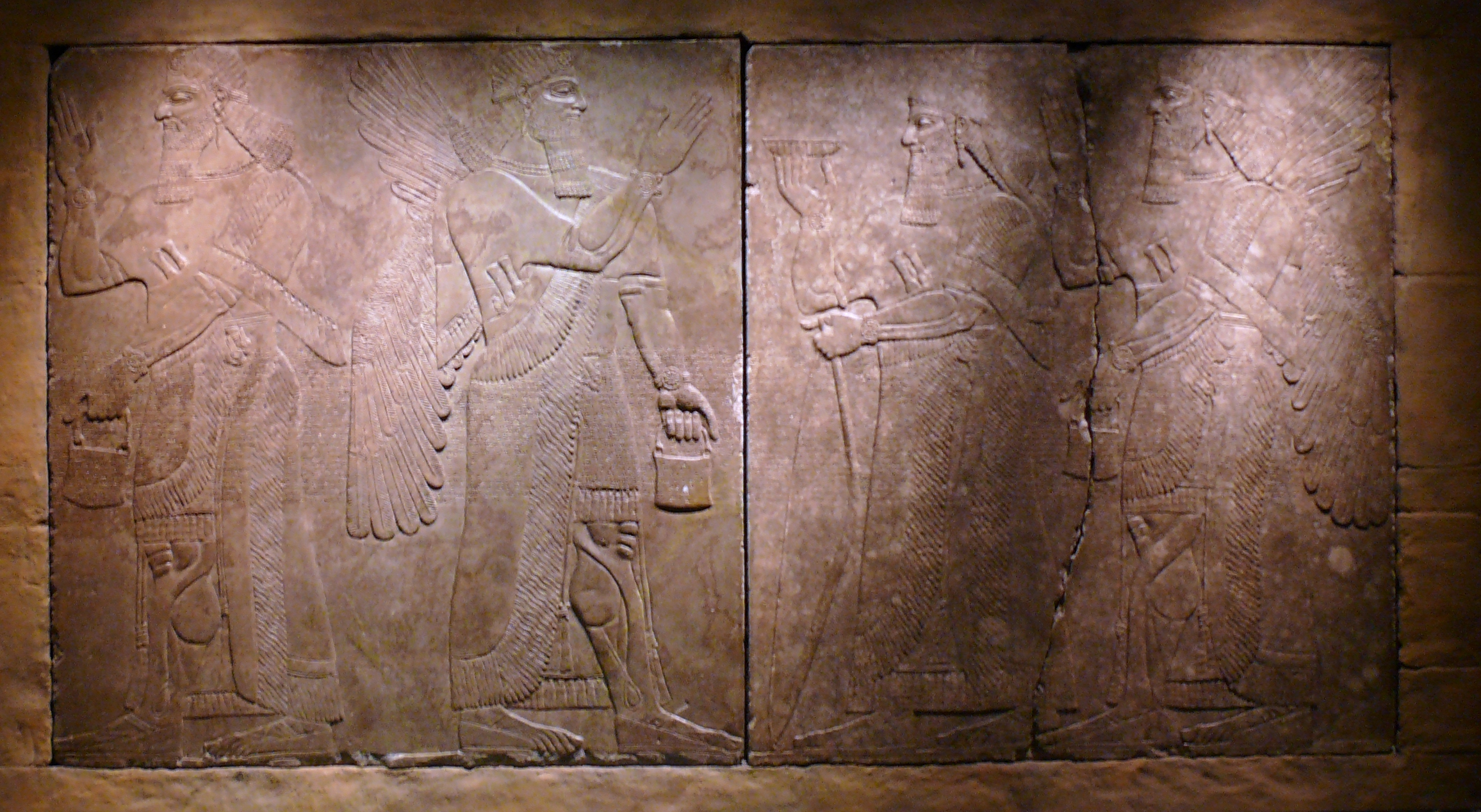
Assyrian reliefs

The Museum and Art Gallery's origins lie in the foundation, in 1823, of the Bristol Institution for the Advancement of Science and Art, sharing brand-new premises at the bottom of Park Street (about 400 metres (440 yd) downhill from the current site) with the slightly older Bristol Literary and Philosophical Society. The neoclassical building was designed by Sir Charles Robert Cockerell (1788–1863), who was later to complete the Fitzwilliam Museum, Cambridge, and build St. George's Hall, Liverpool, and was later used as the Freemasons Hall.

In April 1871, the Bristol Institution merged with the Bristol Library Society, and on 1 April 1872 a new combined museum and library building in Venetian Gothic style was opened at the top of Park Street. The lease on the former Bishop's College building next door, which had been the Library Society's home since 1855, passed to the local army reserve unit, whose drill hall lay behind it; it became the Victoria (later Salisbury) Club and a restaurant. The old Institution building was sold to the Freemasons. Although the new building was extended in 1877, by the 1890s the Museum and Library Association was struggling financially, and even unable to pay its curator, Edward Wilson (1848–1898). Negotiations with the city corporation culminated in the transfer of the whole organisation and premises to Bristol city corporation on 31 May 1894. Wilson remained Curator until his death – only this time he was actually paid!

However, in June 1899 the site of the Salisbury Club was offered for sale to the city, the tobacco baron, Sir William Henry Wills (1830–1911, later Lord Winterstoke) offering £10,000 to help buy the site and build a new City Art Gallery on it. Designed by Frederick Wills in an Edwardian Baroque style work on the new building started in 1901, and opened in February 1905 with an inaugural address by Sir Hubert von Herkomer. It was built in a rectangular open plan in 2 sections each consisting of a large hall with barrel-vaulted glazed roofs, separated by a double staircase. It incorporated a Museum of Antiquities, as it had been decided during the planning stage that Assyrian, Egyptian, Greek and Roman antiquities should be grouped with art in the new structure, rather than remaining with the natural history collections that remained in the old building. Stone tools continued to reside with the geology collections within natural history. Yet more space became available to museum displays when Bristol Central Library moved down the hill to College Green in 1906. The vacant rooms were reconstructed as invertebrate and biology galleries.

After a verbose battle, the museum opened on Sundays.

In 1913 the army reserve's drill hall, which now lay between the rear of the Art Gallery and the rapidly expanding University of Bristol, was purchased by the two institutions, three-fifths of the complex falling to the Museum and Art Gallery, the rest to the University. Unfortunately, the outbreak of war in 1914 put paid to any plans for new building; indeed, the Upper Museum Room (geology) was cleared in 1916 to become a 'Soldiers Room' to entertain convalescents and the Egyptian Room 'served for reading and writing and for the delivery of special demonstrations. However, after being used for storage for over a decade, it proved possible to demolish the Drill Hall to permit a rearward extension of the Art Gallery. This was funded by Sir George Alfred Wills (1854–1928, a cousin of Lord Winterstoke) and completed in 1930.

The 1872–77 museum building was gutted by fire following a bomb hit on the night of 24–25 November 1940, during the Bristol Blitz; some 17,000 of the natural history specimens were lost. The 1930 extension of the art gallery was also hit, but luckily escaped the conflagration, although suffering badly from blast damage. Nevertheless, the art gallery partially reopened in February 1941, now also housing some of the museum's surviving material on a 'temporary' basis. Although now housed in the same building, from April 1945, the museum and art gallery were formally split into separate institutions with the lower floor becoming the museum and the upper floors the art gallery. As part of this restructuring, the archaeology and anthropology collections were transferred from the art gallery to the museum.

In February 1947, the remains of the old museum building (with the exception of the undamaged lecture theatre) were sold to Bristol University: it was then rebuilt as its dining rooms, later becoming Brown's Restaurant. The sale of the building in 1947 reflected the intention that new premises would soon be provided for the museum and the art gallery; planning began in 1951, but then dragged on for the next 20 years, during which time the old buildings received minimal attention, other than the insertion of mezzanines to gain additional space.

Meanwhile, various proposals had been made for new museum buildings in Castle Park, in the very centre of Bristol, overlooking the river Avon. However, spiraling costs and funding difficulties meant that in 1971 the plans were abandoned and a smaller amount of money was put into upgrading the existing building. Wholesale refurbishment was required, including rewiring, rearranging offices, creating laboratories and dividing up and furnishing the basement to provide proper storage for the reserve collections.

In the summer of 2009, the museum hosted an exhibition by Banksy called Banksy versus Bristol Museum, featuring more than 70 works of art including animatronics and installations; it is his largest exhibition yet. It was developed in secrecy and with no advance publicity.

In September 2025, more than 600 items from the museum's British Empire and Commonwealth collections were stolen from a storage building, with four unidentified individuals named as persons of interest.

== Collection ==
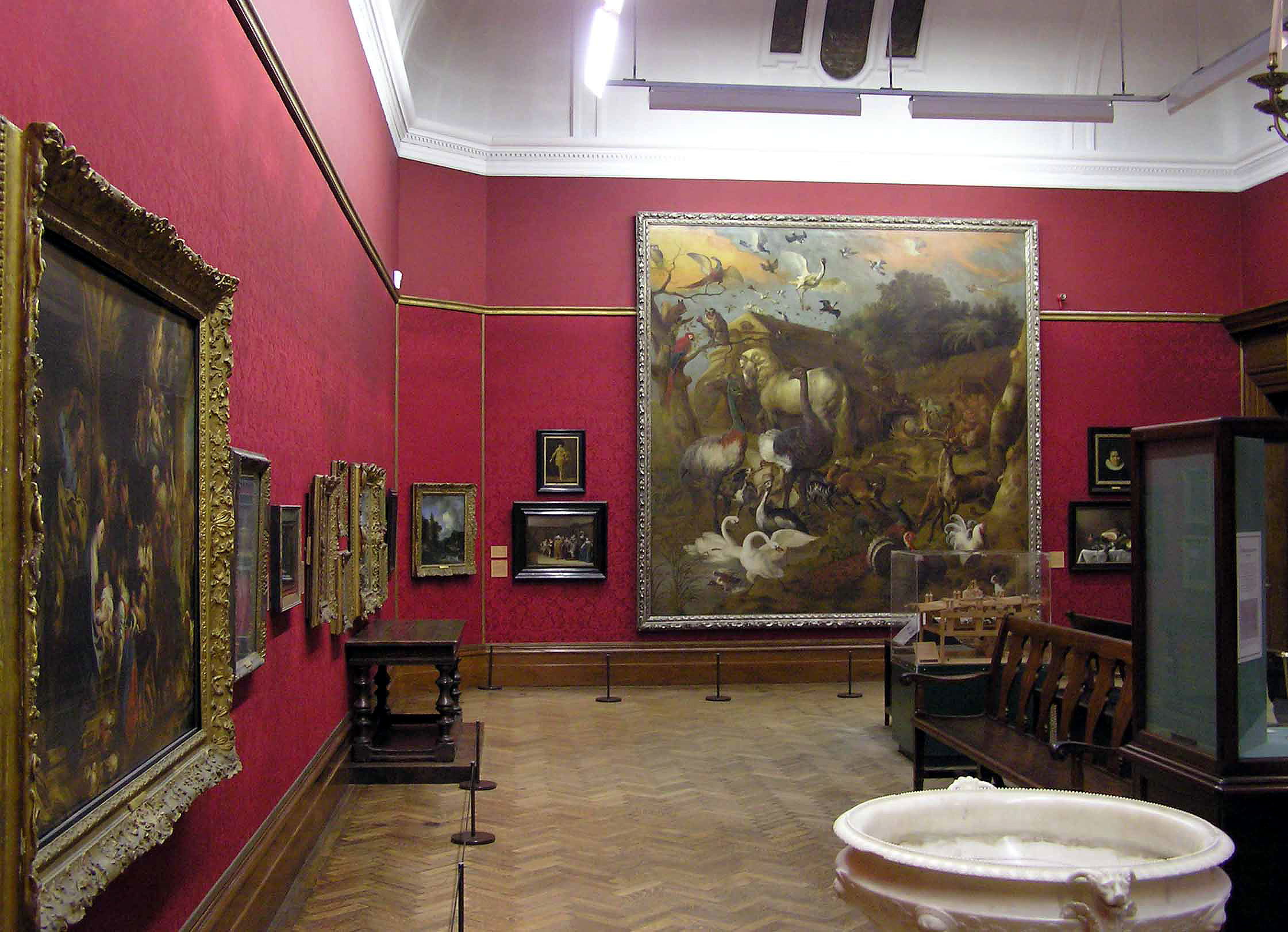
Interior of Bristol Art Gallery. The large picture Noah's Ark (4 m by 4 m) was painted in c.1710 by the Dutch artist Jan Griffier.

The art galleries include a collection of Chinese Glass and the "Schiller collection" of Eastern Art collected by Ferdinand Nassau Schiller, and bequeathed by his younger brother Frederick P. M. "Max" Schiller, the Recorder of Bristol from 1935 to 1946. It contains a range of Chinese ceramics wares spanning different dynastic periods. Particularly fine pieces include a number of white, light blue and green-glazed (Ying Qing and Qingbai) wares from the Tang (AD 618–960) and Song (AD 960–1279) dynasties. It also holds a collection of Bristol blue glass. The museum also acquired 164 mainly 18th-century English drinking glasses from the late Peter Lazarus's collection in 1983.

The Egyptology gallery contains mummies and other items, including a wall decoration made over 3,000 years ago – the Assyrian Reliefs, which were transferred from the Royal West of England Academy. It also has a significant collection of Egyptian antiquities, a considerable number derived from the excavations of the Egypt Exploration Society – such as the stela of Meni – and the British School of Archaeology in Egypt. A completely rebuilt Egyptian gallery opened in 2007.

A natural history gallery contains examples of aquatic habitats in the south west of England and an interactive map of local wildlife sites and a freshwater aquarium containing fish typical of the region.

The museum also holds many of the prehistoric and Roman artefacts recovered before the flooding of Chew Valley Lake, and other local archaeological finds such as those from Pagans Hill Roman Temple and the Orpheus Mosaic from Newton St Loe.

The artwork galleries include Old Masters, the French School, British Collection, Modern Art and the Bristol School.

In 2012 the museum was given the entire 50,000 piece collection of the former British Empire and Commonwealth Museum.

== Funding and support ==
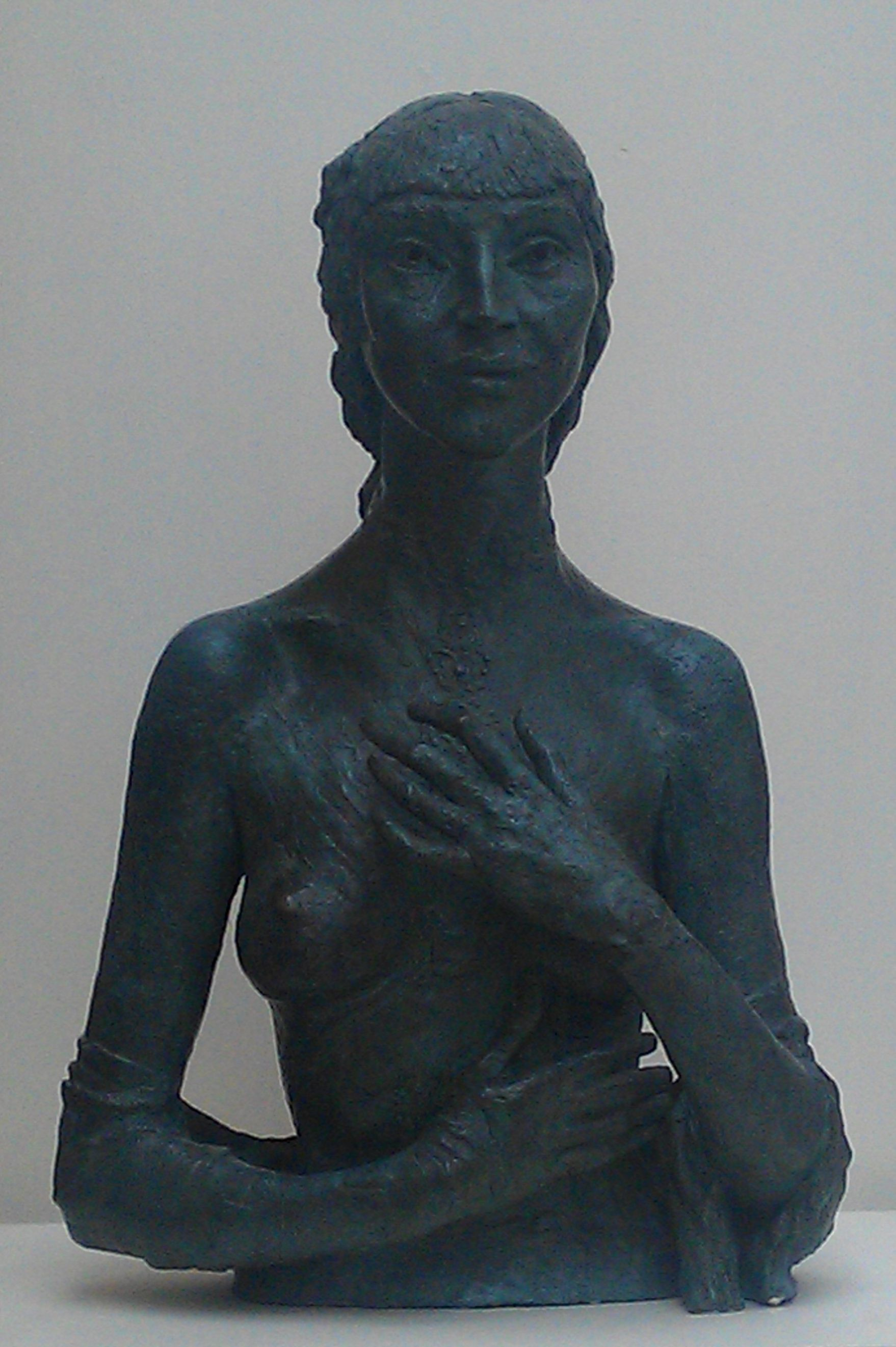
Bronze sculpture of Kathleen Garman by Jacob Epstein, titled Kathleen and made in 1935, while she was his mistress (they later married). The position of her hands and arms are closely modelled on those of Andrea del Verrocchio's marble bust Lady with Primroses.

The museum is one of several in the city supported by Bristol Museums, which in 2019 was funded 36% by Bristol City Council, 23% by Arts Council England grants, and the remainder from sources including donations, ticket and souvenir sales, and venue hire. From 2012 to 2018, Bristol Museums was one of 16 Arts Council England "Major Partner Museums", and from 2015–18 it received £4.7 million from the programme. After Arts Council England replaced the Major Partner Museums programme with the National Portfolio, Bristol Museums has been granted £1.34 million per year from 2018 to 2022, and £1.36 million per year from 2022 to 2026.

The Friends of Bristol Art Gallery has supported the gallery since 1947, acquiring over 300 works of art for the gallery. The Friends of Bristol Museum and Art Gallery was founded in 1977 (first known as the "Bristol Magpies") to support the principal sites of Bristol's museums, galleries and archives service.

== Related museums and sites ==
Other museums and sites administered by Bristol Culture and Creative Industries are M Shed, Blaise Castle House Museum, the Red Lodge Museum, the Georgian House Museum, Bristol Archives and Kings Weston Roman Villa. The Bristol Industrial Museum, which closed in 2006 reopened in June 2011 as a museum called M Shed dedicated to telling the story of Bristol.

== Gallery ==
The Rialto Bridge by Michele Marieschi, 1740

The Close of the Battle of the Saintes by Nicholas Pocock, 1782

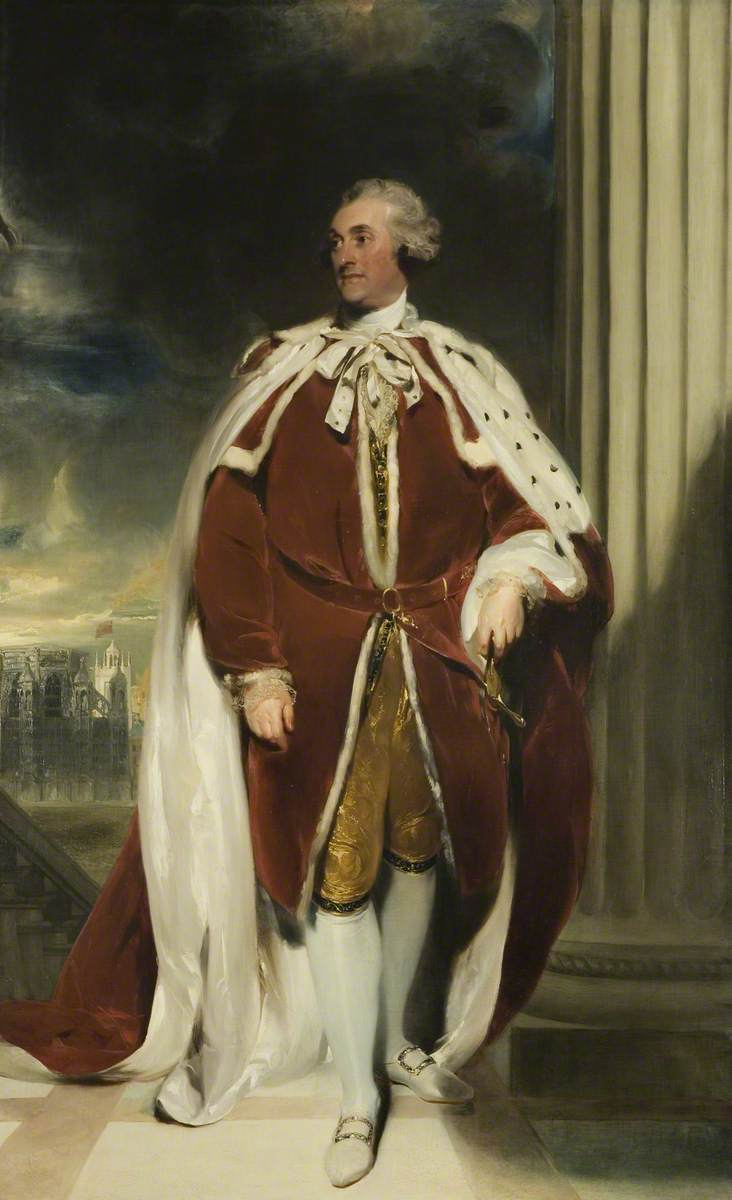
Portrait of the Duke of Portland by Thomas Lawrence, 1792

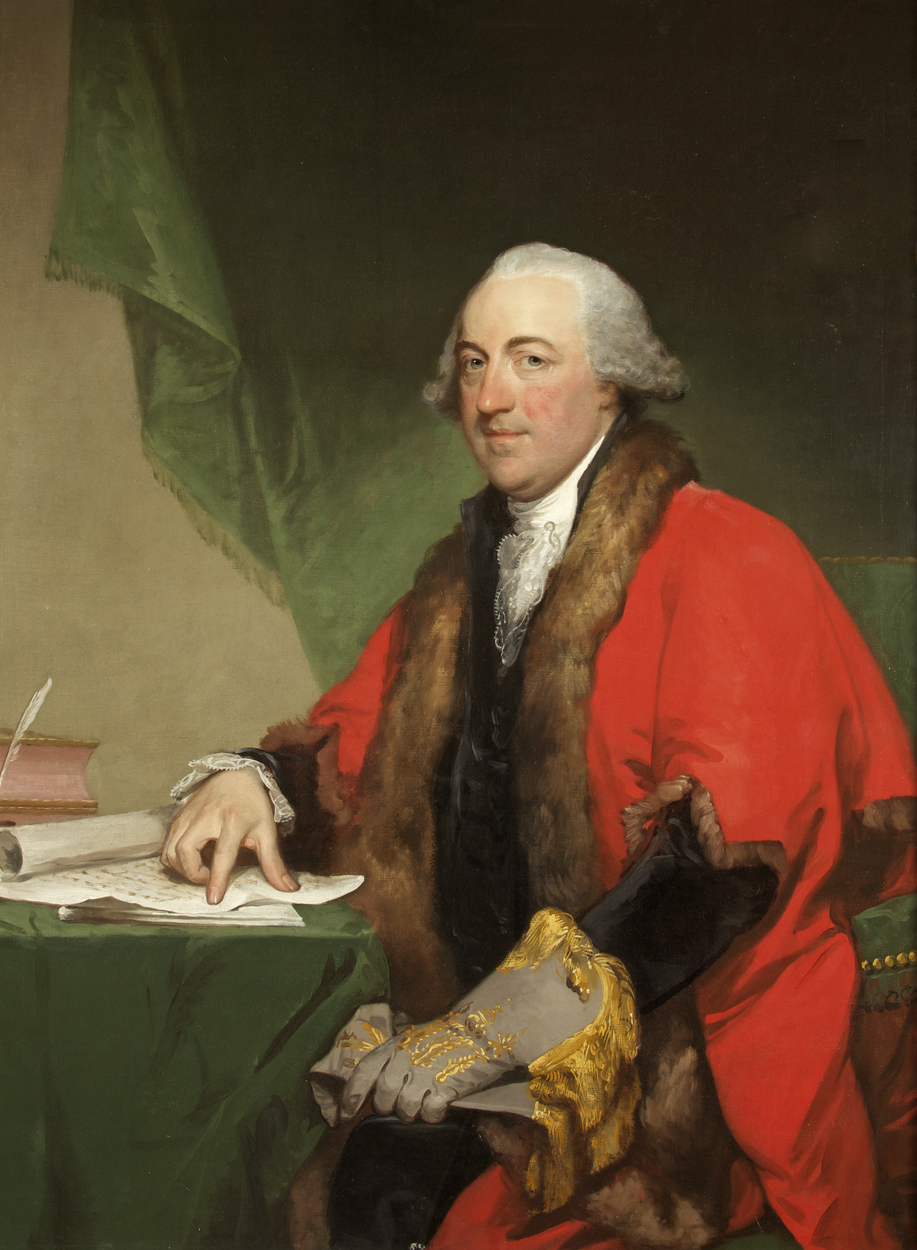
Portrait of Henry Cruger by Gilbert Stuart, 1794

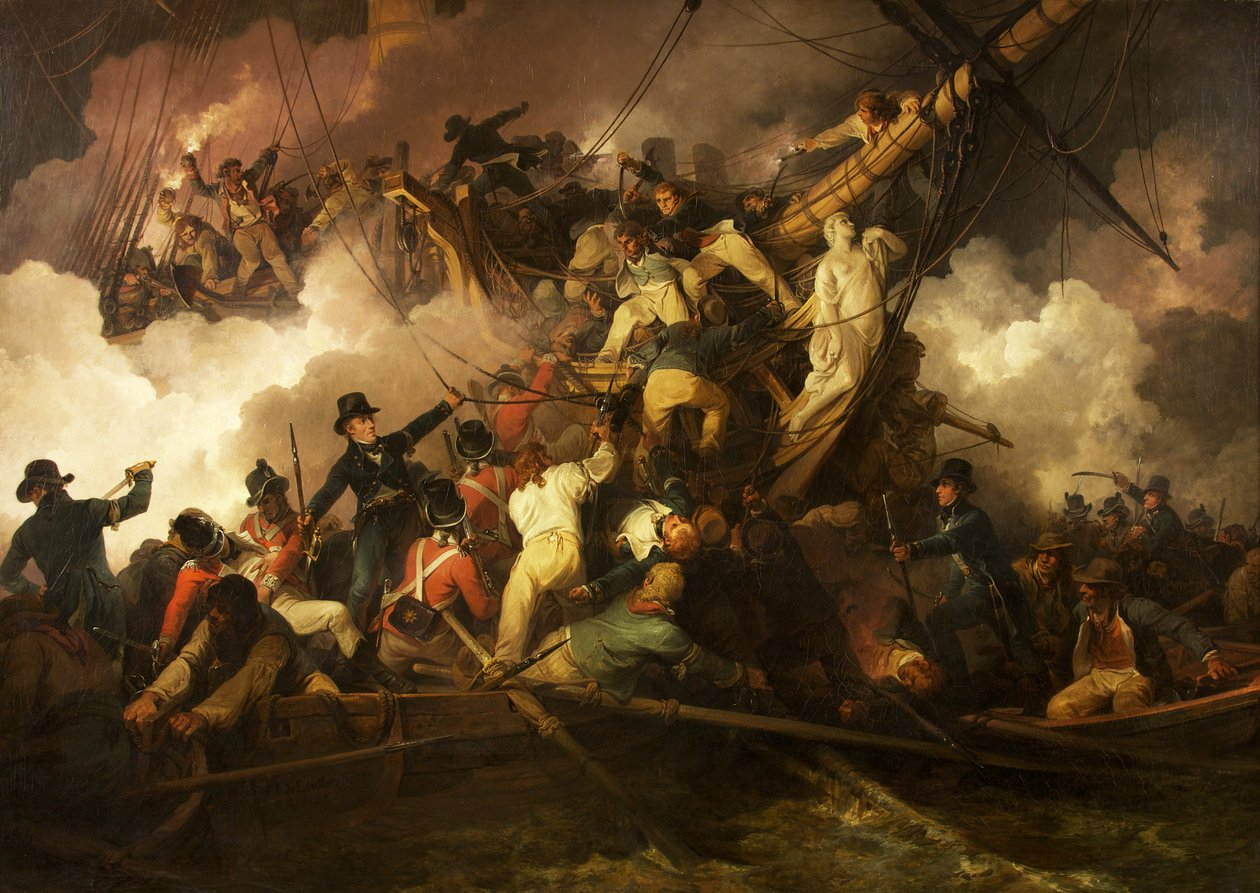
The Capture of the Chevrette by Philip James de Loutherbourg, 1802

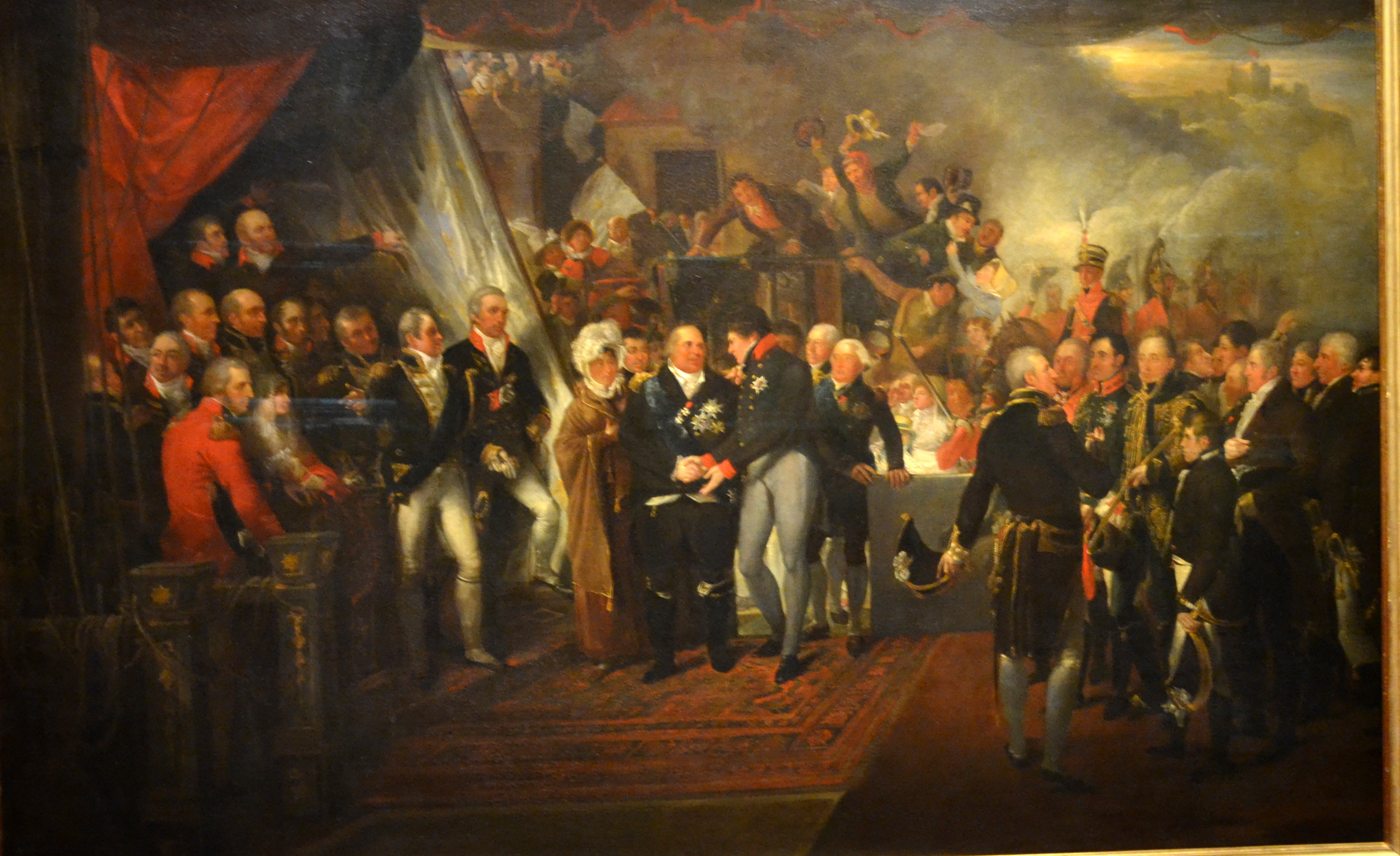
The Embarkation of Louis XVIII at Dover by Edward Bird, 1816

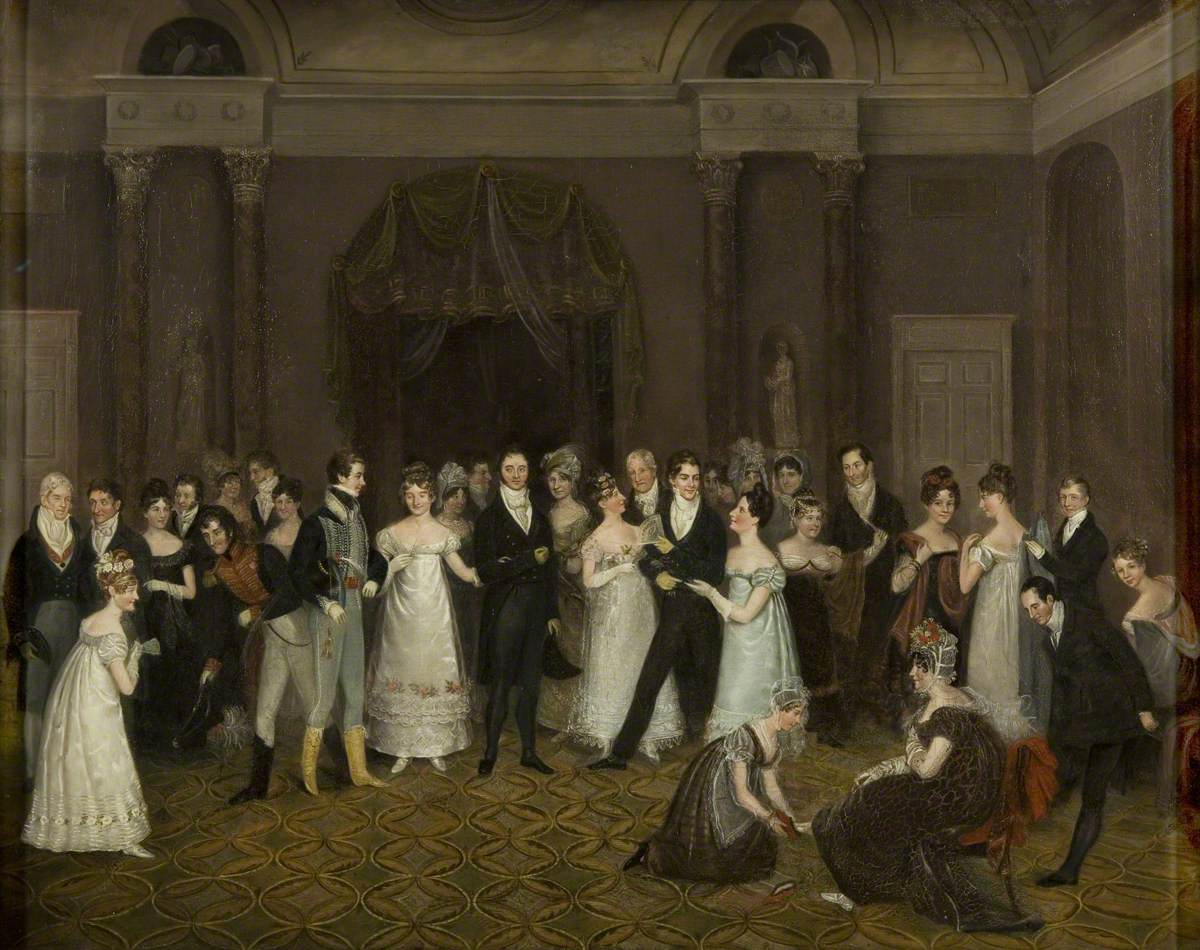
The Cloakroom, Clifton Assembly Rooms by Rolinda Sharples, 1818

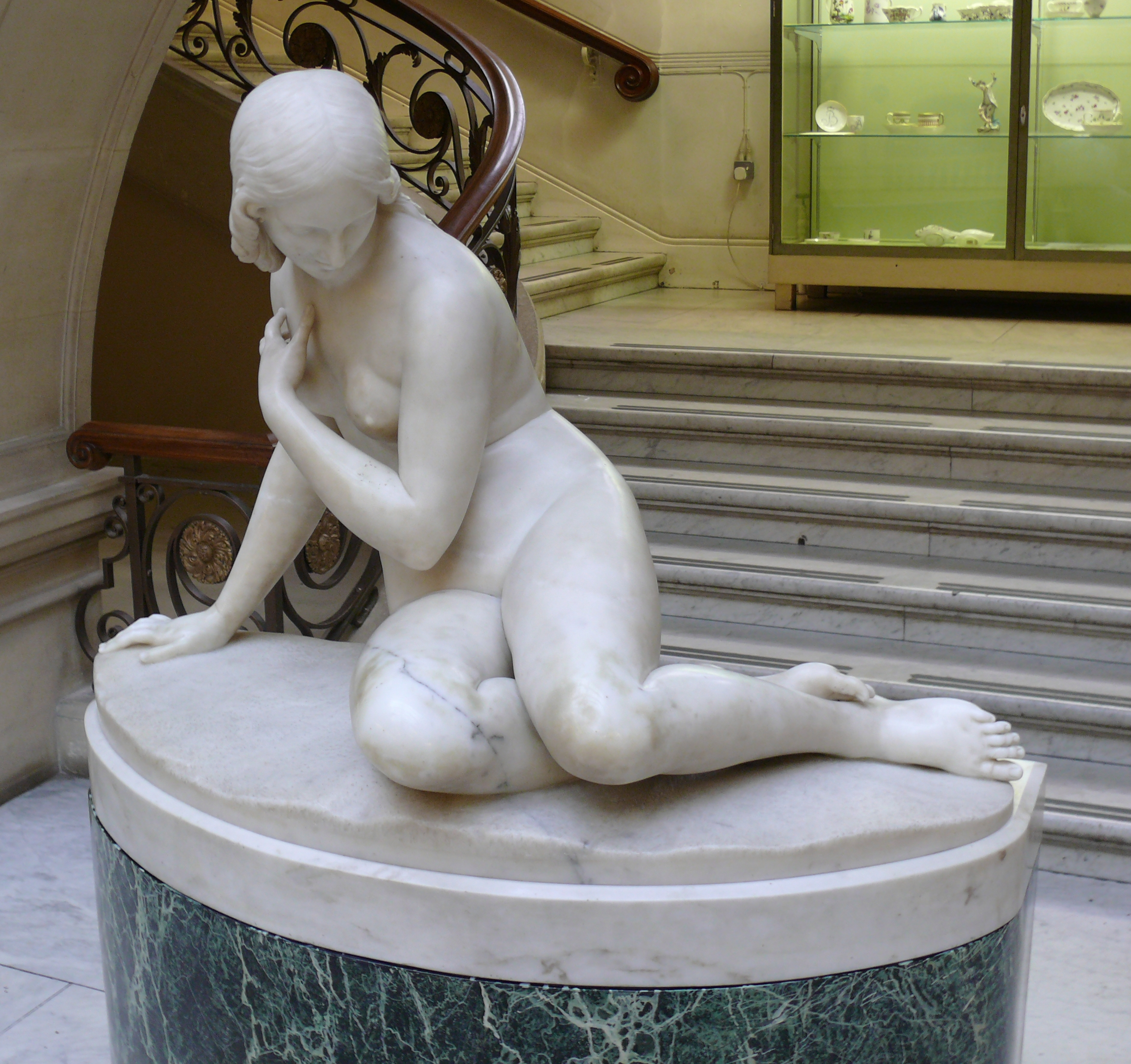
Eve at the Fountain by Edward Hodges Baily, 1822

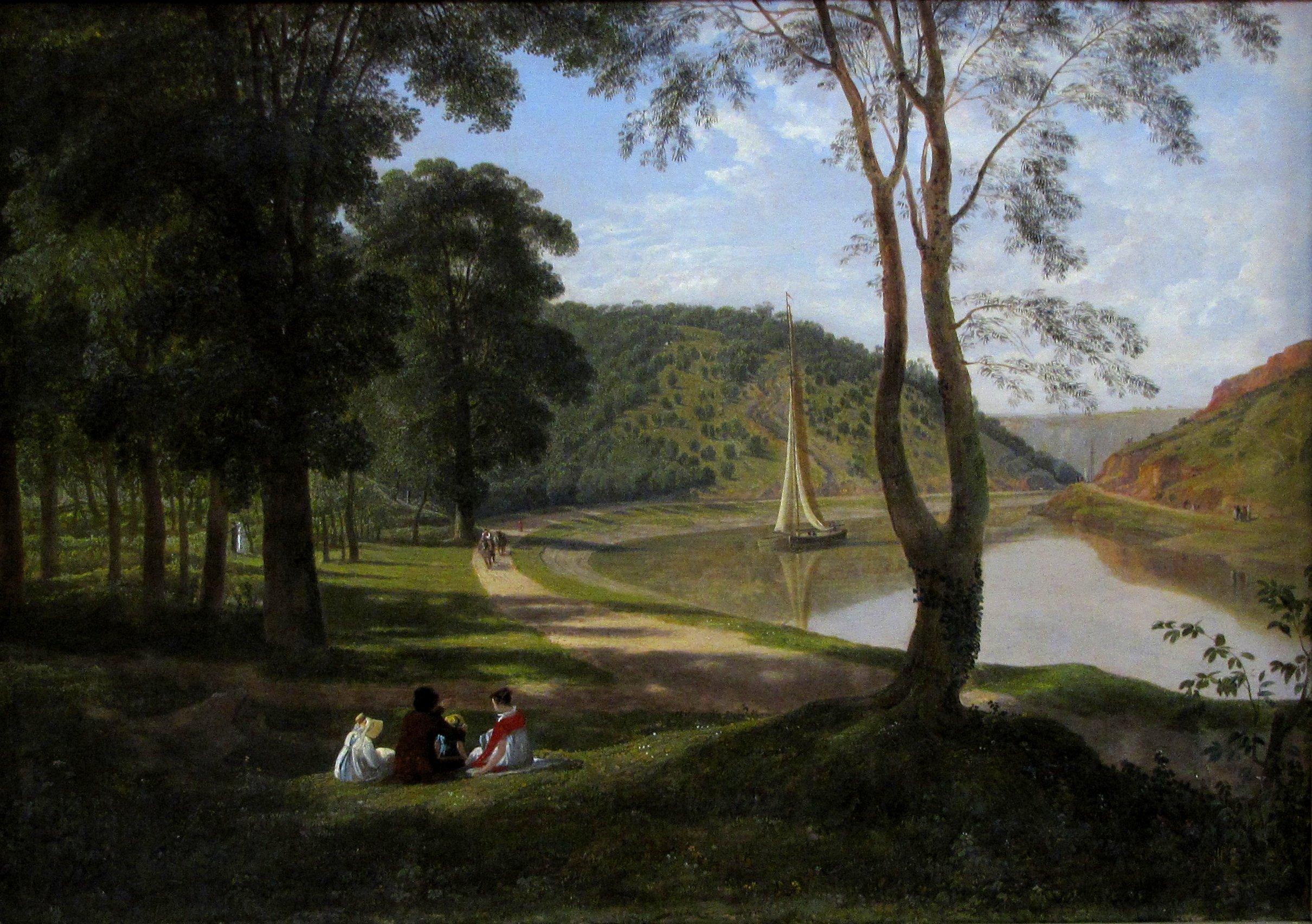
View of the Avon Gorge by Francis Danby, 1822

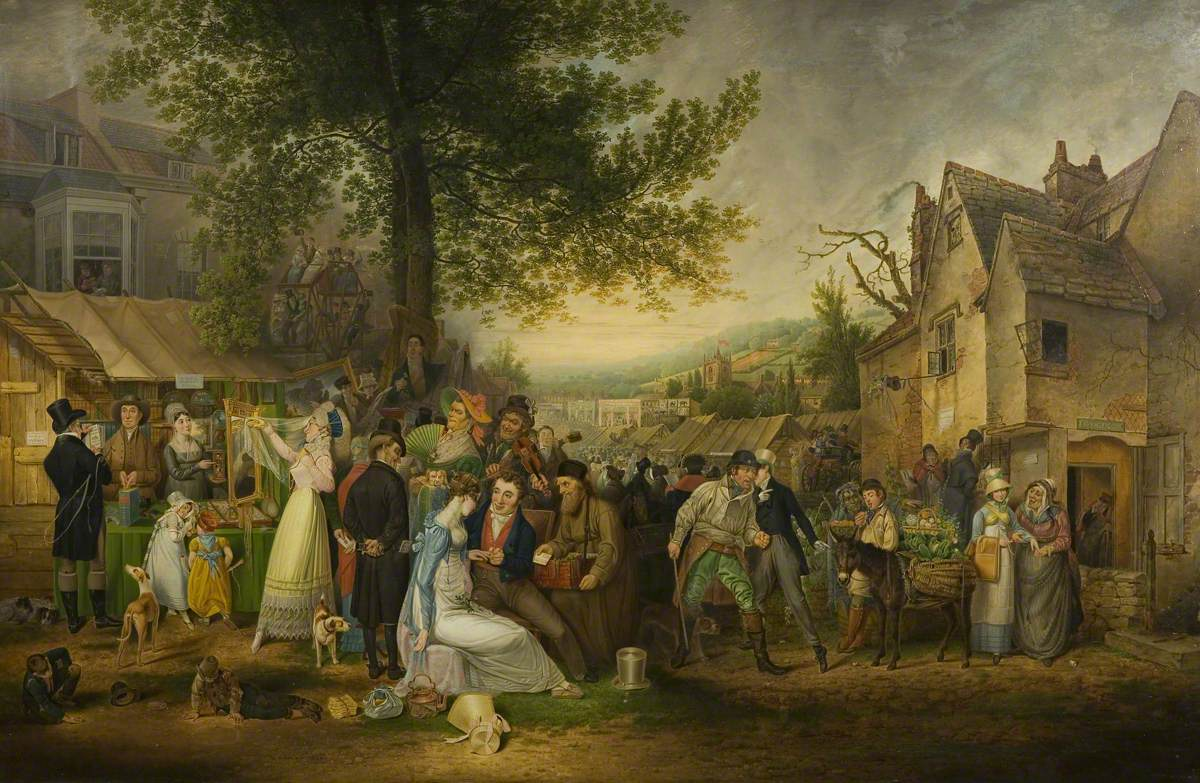
St James's Fair by Samuel Colman, 1824

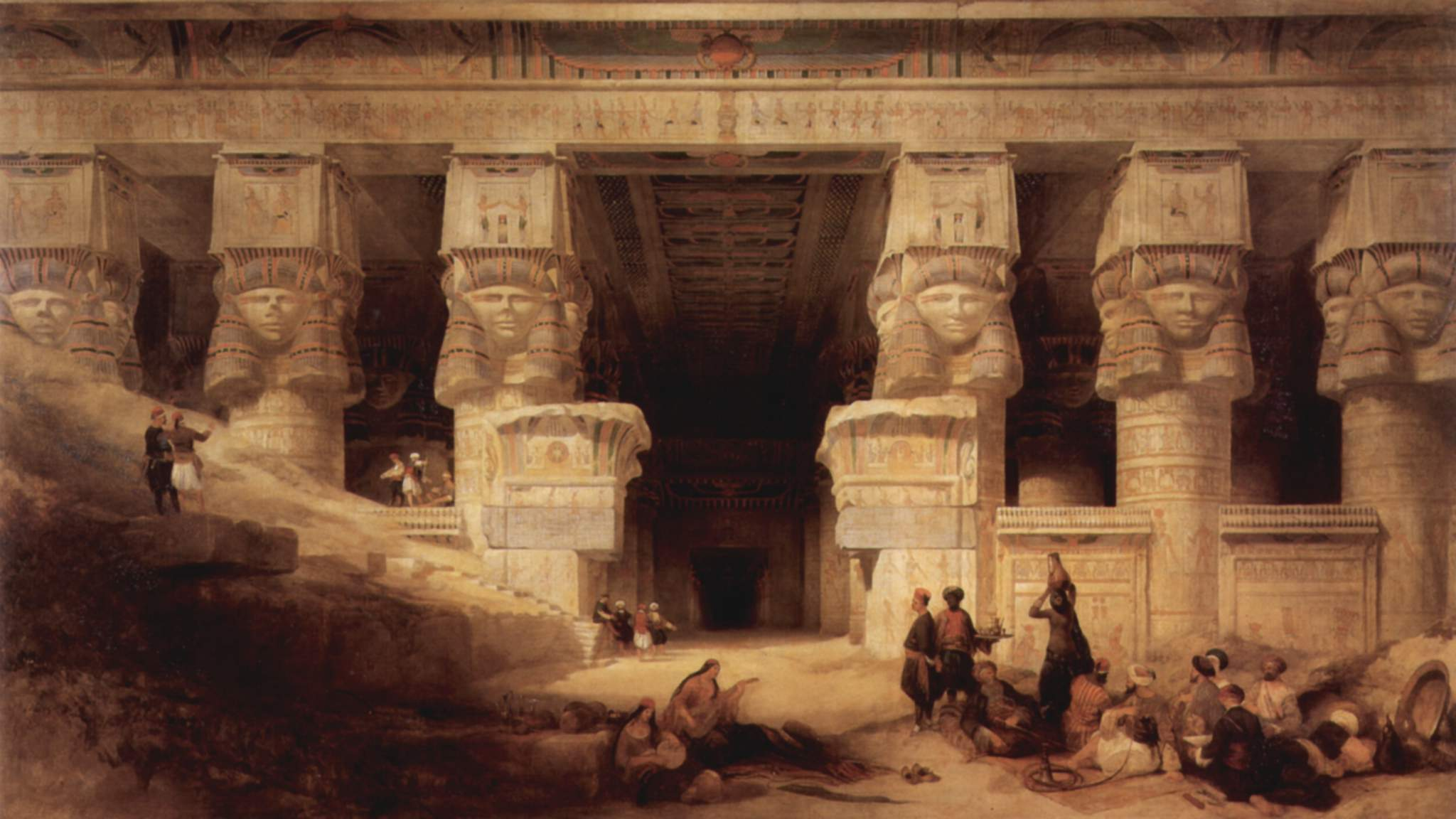
The Temple of Dendera by David Roberts, 1841

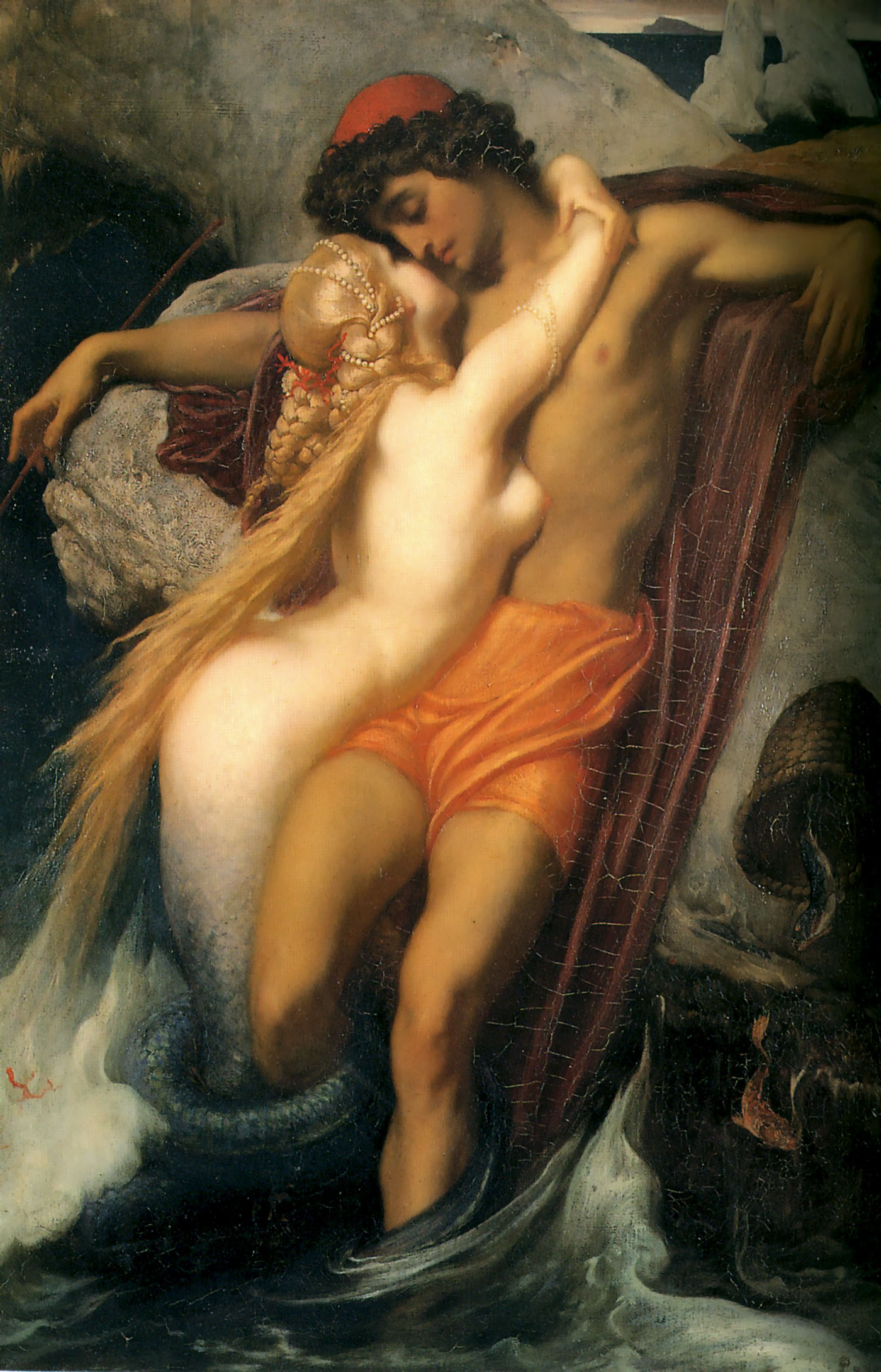
The Fisherman and the Syren by Frederic Leighton, 1858

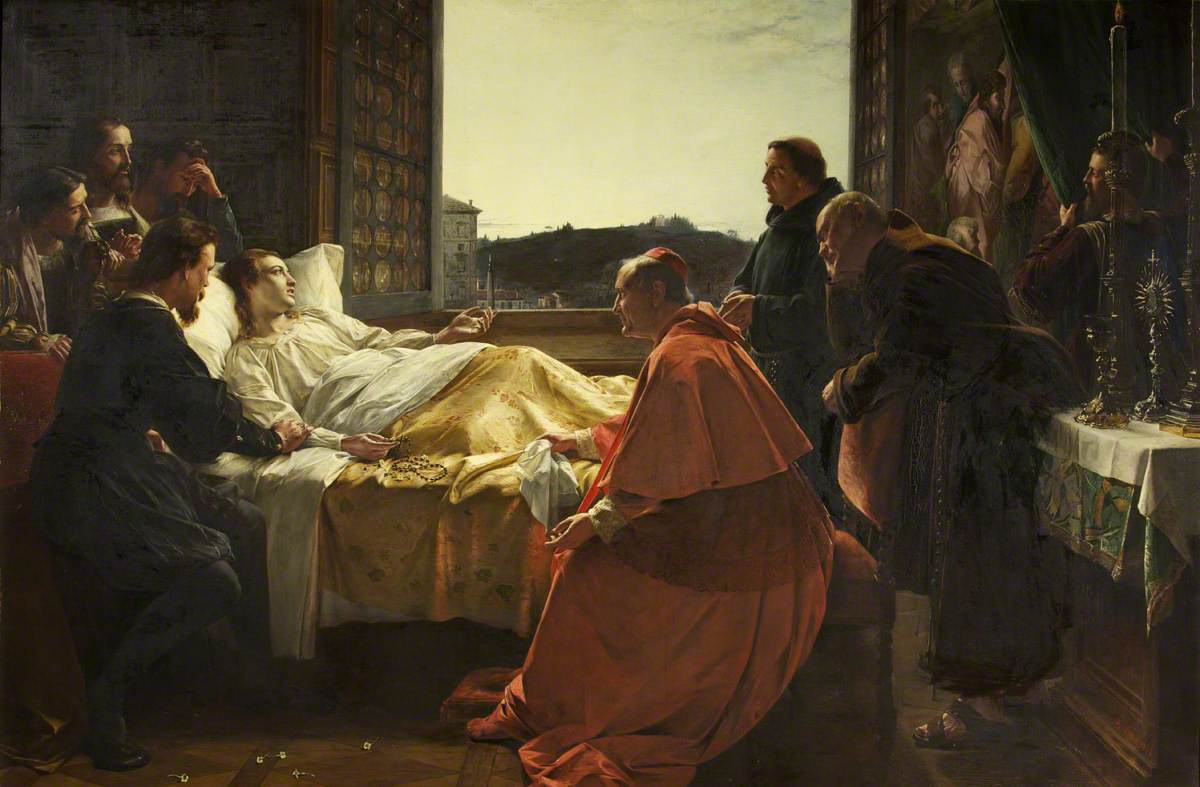
The Last Moments of Raphael by Henry Nelson O'Neil, 1866

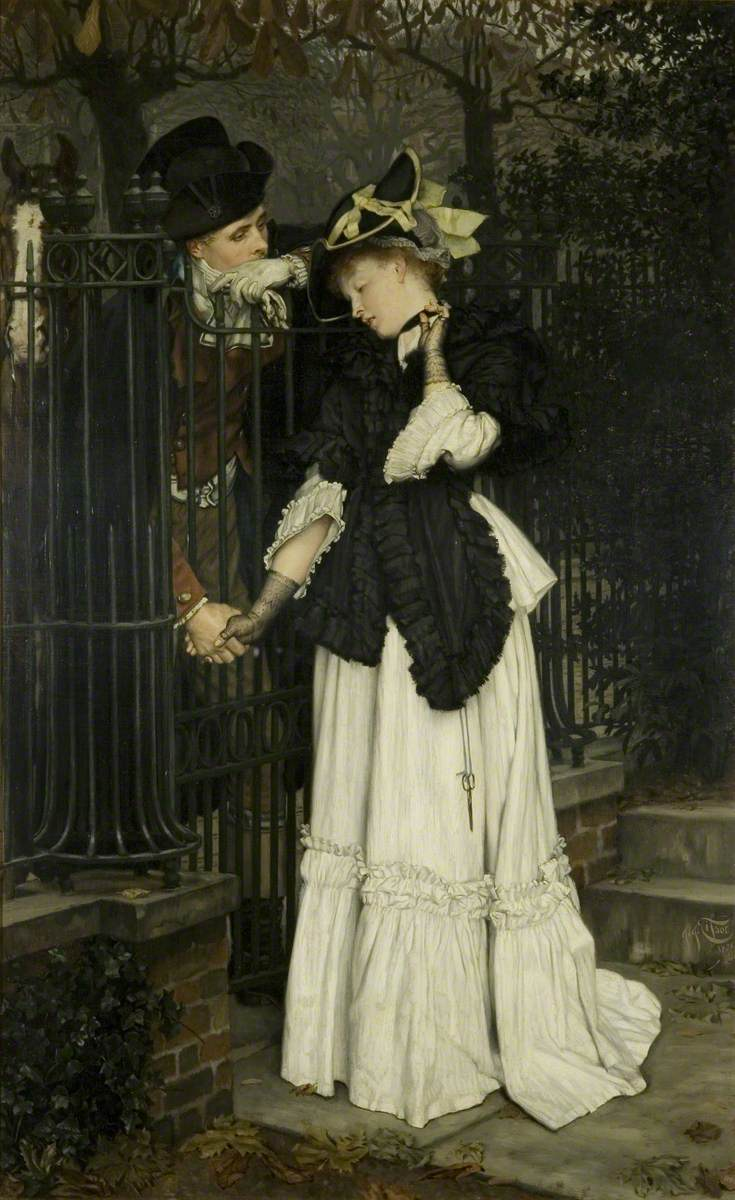
The Farewells by James Tissot, 1871

The Discovery of Moses by Edwin Long, 1886

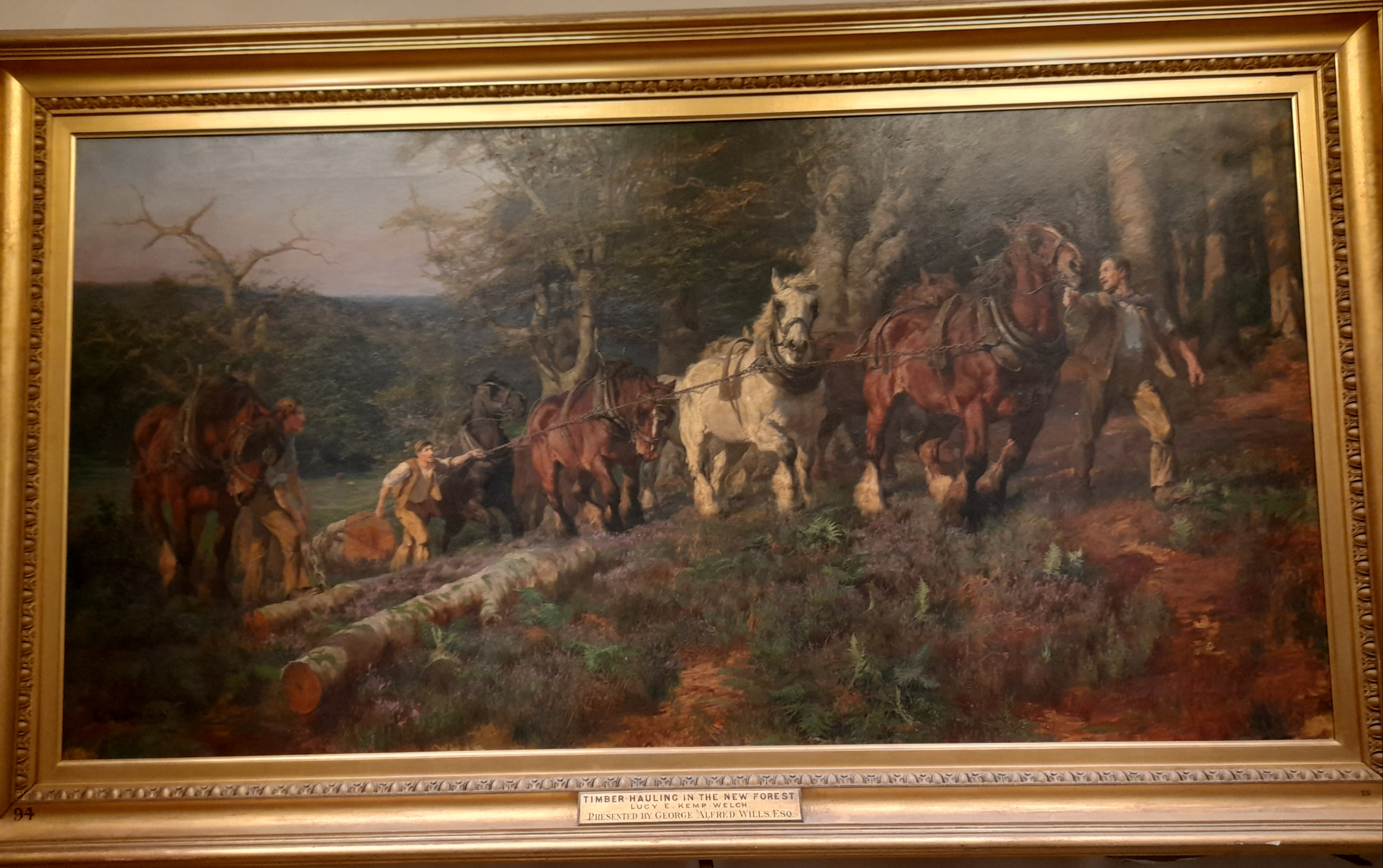
Hauling Timber in the New Forest by Lucy Kemp-Welch, 1904

Dog Tired by C.R.W. Nevinson, 1916

== See also ==
- Grade II* listed buildings in Bristol
- Royal West of England Academy

== References and sources ==
=== Sources ===
- Dodson, Aidan Mark; Sue Giles (August 2007). "Ancient Egypt in the City and County of Bristol, England". KMT. 18 (4): 20–32.
- Walton, K.M. (1980). 75 years of Bristol Art Gallery: The gift of Sir William Henry Wills, Bart to his fellow citizens, 1905 : a short history. Bristol: City of Bristol Museum & Art Gallery. ISBN 978-0-900199-10-3.
