= Alexis Soyer =

French chef (1810–1858)

- Soyer, painted by his wife Emma, 1841
- Born: Alexis Benoît Soyer; 4 February 1810; Meaux-en-Brie, France
- Died: 5 August 1858 (aged 48); London, England
- Occupations: Chef; author; inventor
- Spouse: (Elizabeth) Emma Jones (m. 1837; died 1842)

Alexis Benoît (Note: Originally spelled Bénoist, according to some sources.) Soyer (4 February 1810 – 5 August 1858) was a French chef, writer and inventor, who made his reputation in Victorian England.

Born in north-east France, Soyer trained as a chef in Paris, and quickly built a career that was brought to a halt by the July Revolution of 1830. Moving to England he worked in the kitchens of royalty, the aristocracy and the landed gentry until 1837. He was then appointed head chef of the Reform Club in London, where he designed the kitchens on radical modern lines and became celebrated for the range and excellence of his cooking. His best-known dish, lamb cutlets Reform, has remained on the club's menu since the 1840s and has been taken up by later chefs from Auguste Escoffier to Prue Leith.

Soyer became a well-known author of cookery books, aimed variously at the grand kitchens of the aristocracy, at middle-class households, and at the poorest families, whose diet he strove to improve. He took a keen interest in public health, and when the Irish potato famine struck in the 1840s he went to Dublin and set up a soup kitchen that could feed 1,000 people an hour; he published recipes for inexpensive and nutritious food and developed cheaper alternatives to bread. He left the Reform in 1850 and tried to establish himself independently, but his venture failed and lost him a great deal of money.

During the Crimean War, reports reached London of the appalling privations endured by British soldiers, with disease rife and food inadequate. At the request of the British government Soyer travelled to the Crimea in 1855 and worked with the nursing pioneer Florence Nightingale to improve conditions for the troops. He ensured that in all parts of the army there were nominated cooks, useful recipes, and the means to cook food properly − in particular, the portable Soyer stove which he invented and which remained in army use, with modifications, for more than a century. In the Crimea, Soyer became seriously ill; he never fully recovered his health. A little over a year after his return to London in 1857 he died of a stroke.

== Life and career ==
=== Early years ===
Meaux-en-Brie in the 19th century

Soyer was born on 4 February 1810 in Meaux-en-Brie in north-eastern France. He was the youngest of the five children, all boys, of Emery Roche Soyer and his wife, Marie Madeleine Françoise, née Chamberlan. (Note: The second and third sons died in infancy.) Meaux had been a Huguenot stronghold and retained a reputation for religious toleration. Emery Soyer and his wife, who are thought to have been Protestants, settled in the town in 1799. Emery had several jobs, one of them as a grocer, and scraped a modest living.

Soyer's early life is not well documented. According to his first biographers, François Volant and J. R. Warren, the boy was destined by his parents for the Protestant ministry and was sent to a local seminary at the age of nine. In Volant and Warren's account, Soyer rebelled against the claustrophobic environment of the seminary and deliberately contrived his expulsion by ringing the church bell at midnight, causing general alarm in the town. Later biographers differ about the plausibility of this account: Ruth Brandon (2004) finds the story improbable; Ruth Cowen (2006) does not discount it, but notes that there are no surviving school records for Soyer; Elizabeth Ray, in the Oxford Dictionary of National Biography (2011), treats the story as true. (Note: Helen Morris (1938) also treats the story as true, but as Elizabeth David noted in 1986, Morris "lifted large chunks of the Volant/Warren book, sometimes word for word".)

In 1821 Soyer was sent to Paris to live with his eldest brother, Philippe, who was a cook. Philippe arranged an apprenticeship for him at a restaurant run by a friend, Georg Rignon, first in the Rue Vivienne, near the Bourse, and later relocated to the Boulevard des Italiens. In 1826 Soyer left to become second chef at Maison Douix, a large restaurant further along the Boulevard des Italiens. Within a year he was promoted to chef de cuisine with a team of twelve chefs beneath him.

By the end of the decade Soyer had struck out on his own, providing grand and high-profile banquets in aristocratic households. His career in Paris was halted by the July Revolution in 1830. Sources differ as to whether it was in a freelance capacity or as a newly appointed full-time chef to the French foreign ministry that he was cooking for a banquet given by the French chief minister, Jules de Polignac, when an armed mob broke in. Soyer was unharmed, but in the aftermath of the revolution his association with the fallen Bourbon aristocracy made him persona non grata and unemployable. At the suggestion of his brother Philippe he moved to England. He left behind him a young woman, Adelaide Lamain, and the baby son recently born to them.

=== London ===
By the time of the 1830 revolution in France, Philippe Soyer had been living and working in London for several years. There was a long tradition of French chefs working in the houses of Britain's rich and powerful; among the celebrated chefs to move from France to England in the early 19th century were Louis Eustache Ude and Antonin Carême. Philippe was head chef to the Duke of Cambridge, a son of George III, at Cambridge House, the duke's mansion in Piccadilly. In early 1831 Philippe secured a junior post for his brother in the kitchens of Cambridge House.

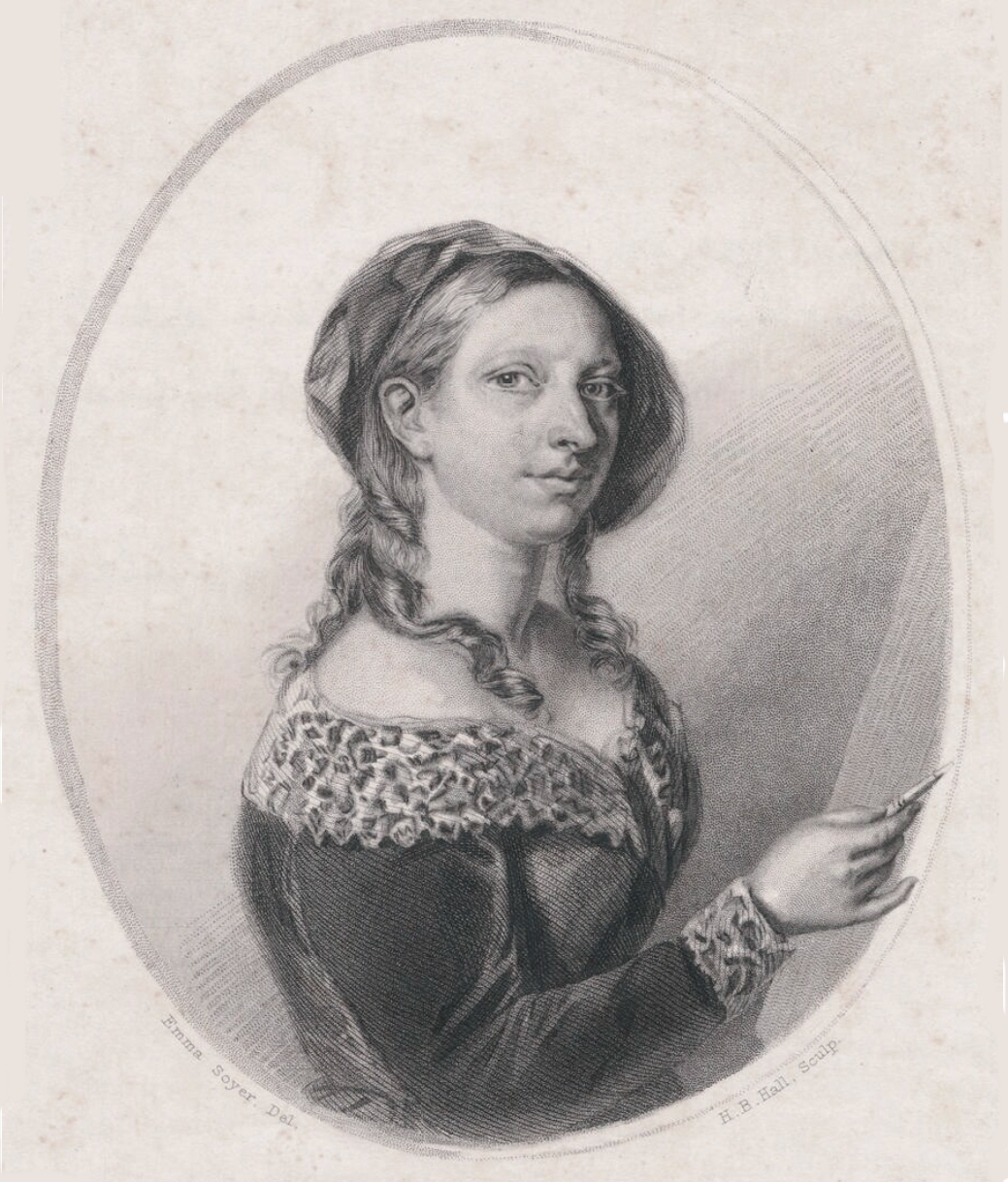
Emma Soyer: self-portrait drawing, engraved by H. B. Hall

Over the next six years Soyer moved upwards from post to post. He became sous-chef to the 2nd Marquess of Waterford, and then, in 1833, to the 1st Duke of Sutherland, whose London residence, Stafford House (now Lancaster House), was widely considered to be the grandest in the capital. The duke died in July of that year and Stafford House passed to his son. The latter's wife, Harriet, was a Whig hostess and promoter of liberal causes; she remained a friend and supporter of Soyer throughout his life.

Soyer gained his first appointment as a head chef in a British establishment in the household of William Lloyd, a rich landowner, who maintained a town house in Upper Brook Street, Mayfair but whose main residence was at Aston Hall in Shropshire. Soyer worked for the Lloyd family for more than three years, becoming well known among the Shropshire landed gentry, who vied to lure him away from the Lloyds but had to content themselves with borrowing his services for important occasions. During his employment with the Lloyds he decided to have his portrait painted by François Simonau, a Belgian painter and teacher based in London. By some accounts he intended to send the portrait to Adelaide Lamain in Paris, but at Simonau's studio he met the artist's stepdaughter and pupil (Elizabeth) Emma Jones, with whom he fell in love. Simonau was not pleased – "A mere chef!" – but the romance flourished.

Soyer left the Lloyds in early 1836 to take over the kitchens of the 1st Marquess of Ailsa at St Margaret's House near Twickenham, a large riverside residence. Ailsa also had a central London house at the Privy Garden in Whitehall. He was a gourmet, a prominent Whig and a freemason; it is possible that it was he who introduced Soyer to freemasonry, of which he became a lifelong member. Ailsa took a very active interest in the kitchen, discussing menus in detail with Soyer, and was to remain a friend and supporter when Soyer moved on after a year.

=== Reform Club ===
On 12 April 1837 Soyer and Emma Jones were married in St George's, Hanover Square. One of the witnesses was Soyer's friend Ude, then London's most celebrated chef. Soyer encouraged his wife's burgeoning artistic career, and she continued to exhibit and sell her paintings.

At around the same time (Note: Most of the sources follow Volant and Warren in giving the year as 1837, although a researcher found in the club's archives an entry indicating that Soyer's appointment followed three short-lived tenures as chef and began in March 1838.) Soyer was appointed head chef of the recently-founded Reform Club, a liberal-minded rival to the right-wing Carlton Club, situated nearby. The Reform was temporarily based in Pall Mall while purpose-built permanent premises were built further along the same street. Elizabeth David comments that Soyer's appointment:

... carried with it the opportunity to have his say in the lay-out and furnishing of the kitchens in the great new Club house planned to replace the old premises ... The architect was to be Charles Barry, and Soyer was to collaborate with him on the overall design of the kitchen quarters, the stoves, the equipment. For the ambitious, inventive, hyperactive young Frenchman it was the chance of a lifetime.

On 28 June 1838 Queen Victoria was crowned; on the day of the coronation the Reform Club put on a grand breakfast for 2,000 members and guests. Soyer served "déjeuner à la fourchette" – a buffet – featuring among other dishes:

Bouillon aux œufs (clear soup topped with a poached egg)
Eperlans en brochettes (whitebait on skewers)
Galantine de volaille (boned and rolled chicken)
Jambon á la gelée (jellied ham)
Pâté de pithiviers (lark pâté)

Salade á la jardinière (garden salad)
Truffes au vin de champagne (balls of ham, veal and truffle cooked in champagne)
Pannequets au confiture (pancakes with jam)
Tartes sucrées (sweet tartlets)
Fruits et dessert (fruit and dessert)

Other dishes in the buffet, as recorded by Cowen, were "delicate fish in clear aspics, succulent pigeons wrapped in vine leaves, salmon in pastry cases and tiny butter croustades filled with lobster, oysters and carefully blended pâtés".

Soyer's kitchens at the Reform Club. He is seen at the centre in his trademark beret worn aslant, showing two visitors round.

Soyer's kitchens at the Reform were the most talked-of in the country, and became a tourist attraction. The Morning Chronicle commented that the British Museum, Westminster Abbey and other tourist attractions were outshone by Soyer's kitchens at the Reform Club.

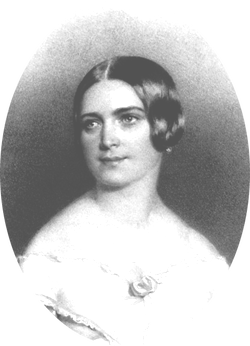
Fanny Cerrito, 1842

The kitchens used a variety of fuels: coal, charcoal, and gas − the last a major innovation. Meat and game were kept in a larder fitted with slate tabletops and lead-lined ice-drawers, keeping the temperature cool and constant. Fish was kept fresh on a marble slab under a constant stream of iced water. The main kitchen table was large and twelve-sided; at its centre was a steam-heated metal cupboard in which delicate dishes could be kept hot. The table was built around the kitchen's four central columns, to which Soyer had small cupboards attached, holding spices, salt, fresh herbs, breadcrumbs and bottled sauces, conveniently to hand for the chef and his juniors. David notes that, unusually, several of Soyer's junior chefs were women.

In 1842, at the invitation of Leopold I, King of the Belgians, Soyer travelled to Brussels. During his absence his wife had a miscarriage and died. He was distraught and, according to Ray, "never fully recovered from his grief and guilt at having left his wife alone". He commissioned a memorial statue, and threw himself into his work, becoming even busier. In 1844 he fell in love again, this time with the ballet dancer Fanny Cerrito, with whom he began an amitié amoureuse (Note: A romantic friendship, in some cases platonic, in other cases not. Brandon writes, "by September 1844 when Emma's monument was erected at Kensal Green cemetery, the two had almost certainly become lovers".) that lasted the rest of his life.

Soyer's best-known dish, still on the club's menu in 2023, is côtelette d'agneau Réforme – lamb cutlets Reform – fried breaded lamb cutlets served with the piquant Reform sauce. (Note: Reform sauce is made from a mirepoix of vegetables, and vinegar, redcurrant jelly, beetroot, mushrooms, egg white, gherkin, truffle and lamb's tongue. Chopped ham and parsley are added to the breadcrumbs with which the cutlets are coated.) His original recipe, published in 1846, runs to more than 500 words. Later chefs, including Auguste Escoffier and more recently Victor Ceserani, Mark Hix and Prue Leith, have featured the dish in their repertoires. Escoffier's recipe is considerably shorter than Soyer's but both contain the same essential ingredients, although Escoffier specifies truffles in addition.

Soyer's 1846 banquet for Ibrahim Pasha of Egypt

Among the most celebrated of the banquets that Soyer provided for the Reform Club was one given in honour of the visiting Ibrahim Pasha of Egypt in July 1846. There were four kinds of soup; four of fish (salmon, trout, turbot and whiting); thirteen different entrées, including spring chicken, mutton cutlets, hot quail terrine, young hare and vol-au-vents of mackerel's roe; eight roasts (among them capon, duck, turkey and saddle of mutton); and then a course that in the manner of the time offered choices of both savoury and sweet dishes: among others, curried lobster, chicken salad or game galantines, and crisp cakes of almonds and cherries, praline tarts with apricots, or pineapple crystallised jellies. The climax of the menu was the dessert, named La Crème d'Egypte à l'Ibrahim Pacha: a huge pyramid of meringue and cake, filled with pineapple cream and topped with a portrait of the chief guest's father, Muhammad Ali Pasha.

In 1846 Soyer published The Gastronomic Regenerator − "a simplified and entirely new system of cookery with nearly two thousand practical receipts (Note: "Receipt" in this sense is an old form of the modern term "recipe".) ... illustrated with numerous engravings" − a work of well over 700 pages; according to the historian Eric Quayle the book had "a profound effect on the cooking and eating habits of several generations of Britons". The Times reported that the book had taken the author ten months to prepare, and during that time, as well as writing it, the chef had "furnished 25,000 dinners, 38 banquets of importance, comprising above 70,000 dishes, besides providing daily for 60 servants, and receiving the visits of 15,000 strangers, all too eager to inspect the renowned altar of a great Apician temple". (Note: These are the figures according to Soyer: as Elizabeth David observed, The Times was quoting directly from "what would nowadays be ... the blurb printed on the dust-jacket")

=== Ireland ===
Official opening of Soyer's soup kitchen in Dublin, 1847

During the Irish potato famine, which began in 1845, Soyer was among those agitating for action by the British government to alleviate the starvation. He had recipes published in The Times for cheap but nourishing soup that could be made in large quantities to feed the hungry; he put theory into practice, first in a soup kitchen in Spitalfields in the East End, where Huguenot silk weavers had been impoverished by cheap imports. Under the pressure of public opinion Parliament passed an act authorising the establishment of soup kitchens in Ireland. At the government's request Soyer sought leave of absence from the committee of the Reform in 1847 and went to Dublin, where he set up a kitchen capable of feeding a thousand people an hour.

Soyer's recipes were attacked by the anonymous "Medicus" of the rival Athenaeum Club, who maintained that "Every physician and physiologist knows that the digestive organs in man are incapable of assimilating sufficient nutriment for health or strength from any liquid diet". The Queen's doctor, Sir Henry Marsh, stated that although a liquid diet would suffice for children and for adults in sedentary occupations, labourers needed solid food as well. Soyer responded by providing solid foods such as "pea panada", which an independent report found "only one-fourth the price of bread, while it is fully five times as nutritious". The report concluded that Soyer:

has given to us two boons of no ordinary value, – a model dispensing kitchen of great ingenuity, and a method of economic cooking far superior to any to which the poorer order of our countrymen have hitherto been accustomed.

While in Ireland Soyer wrote a sixpenny book, Soyer's Charitable Cookery, or The Poor Man's Regenerator, and donated part of the proceeds to charity.

=== Return to London ===
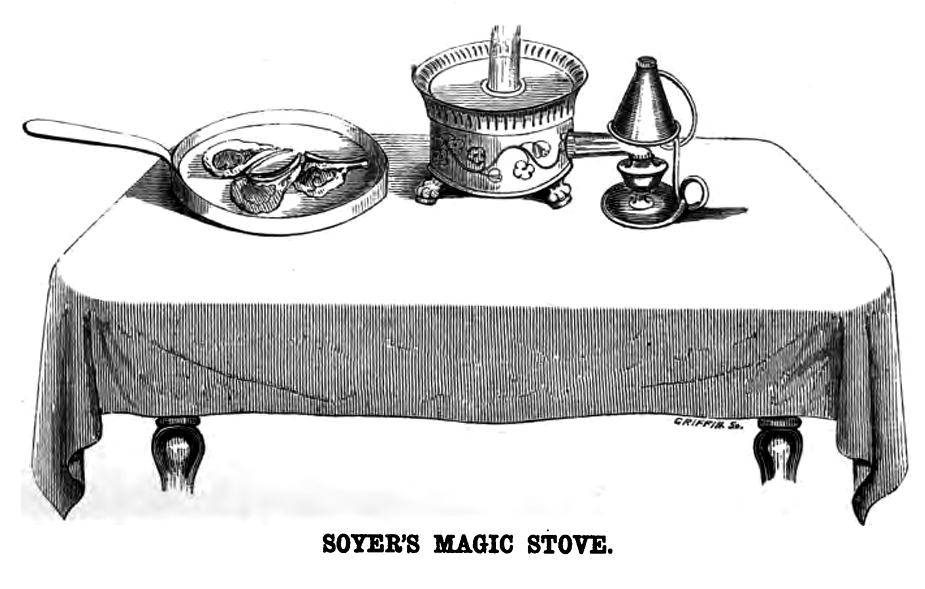

In 1849 Soyer brought out what Ray calls "his most ingenious production", Soyer's Magic Stove, a compact cooker with which food could be prepared at the table. The Morning Chronicle commented that it was certainly portable: "the whole apparatus can be carried at the bottom of your hat". It was a development of earlier devices, and was further developed after his day: an essentially similar device remains in use in restaurants. At his office he exhibited to aristocratic crowds his skill in cooking with this stove, which had a large sale.

As well as the stove, Soyer produced a series of kitchen gadgets that were the forerunners of many modern utensils, and sold a range of patent sauces and relishes. In David's words, "Whatever novelty he produced, from a new bottled sauce to a pair of poultry dissectors, from a six-inch portable table cooker to a gas-fired apparatus for roasting a whole ox, every London newspaper, a good many provincial ones, and often a few Paris journals thrown in, had their say." Soyer never patented his inventions, and therefore made little money from them. His next book, The Modern Housewife (1849), written with a middle-class readership in mind, was in the form of letters between two housewives, and in Ray's view now gives an interesting insight into domestic life of the time.

=== Symposium to Pantropheon ===
Soyer's Gastronomic Symposium, 1851

In 1850 Soyer resigned from the Reform Club. He was invited to tender for the catering at the Great Exhibition being planned for the following year, but he found the brief too restrictive. Instead he took a lease of Gore House, Kensington, opposite the site of the exhibition, and there he created the Gastronomic Symposium of All Nations. It was not only a restaurant but, in Ray's words, "a place of magical entertainment, the gardens being filled with fountains, statues, and replicas of the seven wonders of the world, and offering much else, including fireworks, music for dancing, and other noisy frolics". The Symposium was well attended, but Soyer was not as good a businessman as he was a chef and had aimed at the wrong public. When he left the Reform a friend there had recommended him to set himself up in an exclusive establishment, catering to an elite clientele. Instead, his customers at Gore House were mostly from lower down the social scale, and noise and drunken behaviour caused the local magistrates to withdraw Soyer's licence, forcing him to close the Symposium with a loss of £7,000.

In the last days of the Symposium, Soyer was contacted by Jean Alexis Lamain, his son with Adelaide Lamain. She had died in 1836, and Jean had only recently learned who his father was. The two men met in London and the father acknowledged his son (and later made him his heir) though the two agreed not to publicise their relationship.

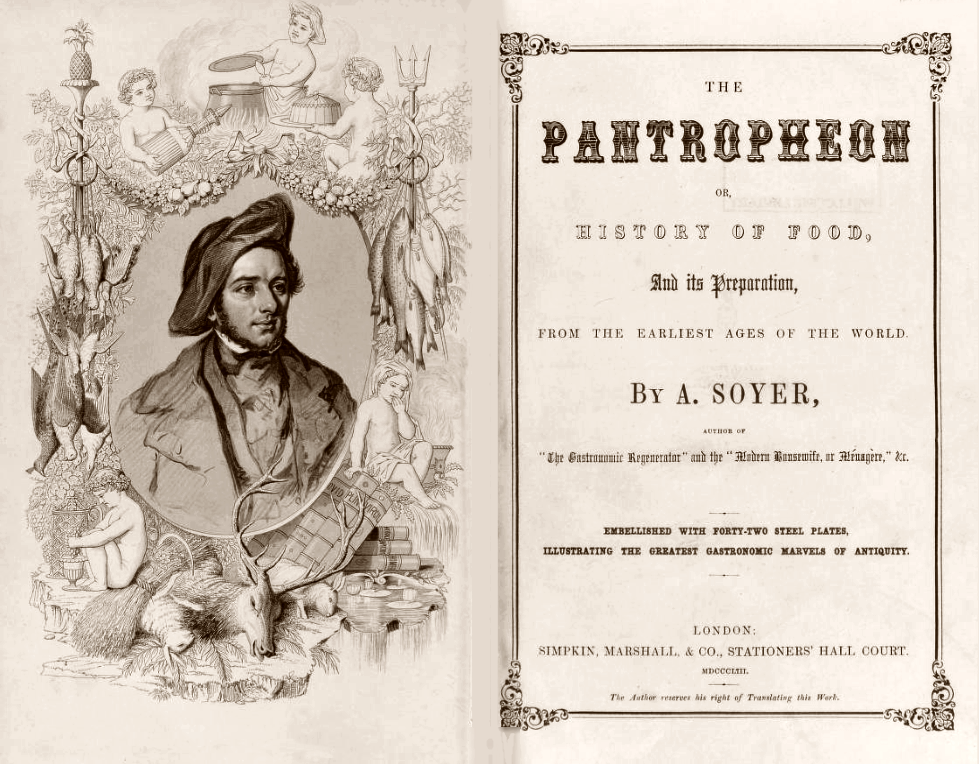
Title pages of Soyer's Pantropheon. 1853

After the closure of the Symposium, Soyer began to restore his reputation by undertaking another pro bono publico assignment. A scandal developed about supplies of canned meat to the Royal Navy. The Admiralty accepted Soyer's offer to examine some of the cans. He endorsed the findings of other examiners that the supplier was using meat unfit for human consumption, and found that the methods of canning were inadequate, allowing even good meat to decompose within the tin. The navy adopted his recommendations that meat should be supplied by supervised suppliers, and – after some official resistance on grounds of cost – that smaller cans should be used, ensuring that the meat was adequately cooked to the centre.

At around the same time Soyer was working on another book. This was a scholarly work, The Pantropheon: (Note: From Greek παν ("pan" − all) and τροφεῖον ("tropheion" − food)) History of Food, and Its Preparation (1853). It was in a completely different style from his previous books, and was almost entirely based on a French manuscript he had acquired from its author, Adolphe Duhart-Fauvet, a fact he concealed at the time. Soyer removed some of Duhart-Fauvet's drier academic passages; the book was favourably reviewed but it did not sell well.

Soyer followed The Pantropheon with a work in his own, livelier style: A Shilling Cookery for the People (1854), aimed at a working-class readership. It opened with 37 soup recipes, and went on to cover topics ranging from the techniques of griddling, boiling and roasting to fish cookery, "important remarks on steak and rumpsteak", meat puddings and pies, a "general lesson on the cooking of vegetables", and sweet pies and puddings. Bell's Weekly Messenger asked, "Where is the housewife who will be satisfied without a copy?".

=== Crimea ===
In 1855 reports of the conditions, described by the historian Roger Swift as "appalling privations", endured by British soldiers in the Crimean War were causing outrage in the press. Having read in The Times of what Cowen calls "the privations being suffered by the troops", who were "racked by disease and near-starvation", Soyer offered the government his services, at his own expense. The offer was accepted and he went out to Scutari and Constantinople, reforming the catering in the hospitals there. He then went with Florence Nightingale to Balaklava and Sevastopol and reorganised the provisioning of the field hospitals, in addition to undertaking the cooking for the Fourth Division of the army.

Until this time, soldiers had a daily allowance of a pound of meat and a pound of bread a day, and were expected to carry and cook their own food. Ignorance led to undercooking and food poisoning on a large scale. Soyer decided that each regiment should have a trained cook, armed with a book of simple recipes which he put together for the purpose. He had brought with him a small team of cooks, whom he sent out to teach selected soldiers. The army adopted his arrangements permanently, giving rise to the appointment of regimental cooks and eventually, decades later, the creation of the Army Catering Corps.

Soyer stove

Before leaving London Soyer had devised field stoves, which he had sent out to him for use in camp kitchens. They were horse-drawn boilers that could cook whether the army was stationary or moving. They proved so efficient and economical that the army used them, with later modifications, for more than a century. (Note: They were in use during the Gulf War (1990–91), although fired by bottled gas or petrol rather than coal or wood.) Nightingale wrote of them, "Soyer's stoves will boil, stew, bake and steam, in short, do everything but grill, ensuring that variety in cooking which is proved essential to health". Soyer's contribution to the war effort brought him further fame in Britain.

In May 1857 Soyer returned to London. He published A Culinary Campaign, recounting his experiences in the Crimea and his reform of army catering. He included a section of recipes for military or naval cooking, such as "Salt Meat for Fifty Men", "Salt Pork with Mashed Peas for One Hundred Men" and "Pot-au-Feu, Camp Fashion". In March 1858 he lectured at the United Service Institution on cooking for the army and navy. He was then asked to design new kitchens for the existing Wellington Barracks.

=== Death ===
While in the Crimea, Soyer had been seriously ill with dysentery and Crimea fever (a form of brucellosis). After his return to London his health remained precarious, but he ignored his doctors' advice to rest (and to give up alcohol, of which he had long been a devotee). In July 1858 he was able to attend the official opening of the kitchens he had designed for the Wellington Barracks, but rapidly declined thereafter. He had a stroke in early August, and died at his house in St John's Wood on 5 August 1858, aged 48. He was buried in Kensal Green cemetery under the elaborate memorial he had erected to his wife, interred there sixteen years earlier. In an obituary tribute The Illustrated London News commented, "There can be no doubt that the seeds of his malady were sown in the Crimea, as ever since he has been ailing, and an overtaxed mind has brought to the grave a man whom the world could ill afford to lose".

== Legacy ==
Styles of cooking have changed since Soyer's time and, with the exception of his lamb cutlets Reform, his recipes rarely feature in modern menus. His chief legacy is in his radical designs for the kitchens of the Reform Club, and elsewhere, which led to important improvements in the conditions in which chefs had to work. Hitherto, even the most prestigious chefs such as Carême had worked in smoky and unhealthy kitchens. Soyer's military stove, with later modifications, remained in use by the British army in both World Wars and beyond.

Soyer's books remain valued by historians of both food and social history. They are:

Book	Subtitle
Délassements culinaires (in French). London: Simpkin and Marshall. 1845. OCLC 26724475.	
The Gastronomic Regenerator. London: Simpkin and Marshall. 1846. OCLC 1505372.	A Simplified and Entirely New System of Cookery, with Nearly Two Thousand Practical Receipts Suited to the Income of all Classes
Soyer's Charitable Cookery. Dublin: Hodges and Smith. 1847. OCLC 503994259.	Or, The Poor Man's Regenerator
The Modern Housewife or Ménagère. London: Simpkin and Marshall. 1849. OCLC 13360438.	Comprising nearly one thousand receipts, for the economic and judicious preparation of every meal of the day : with those of the nursery and sick room, and minute directions for family management in all its branches
The Pantropheon. London: Simpkin and Marshall. 1852. OCLC 1159842499.	Or, History of Food and Its Preparation, from the Earliest Ages of the World
A Shilling Cookery Book for the People. London: Routledge. 1854. OCLC 1157227860.	Embracing an Entirely New System of Plain Cookery and Domestic Economy
A Culinary Campaign. London: Routledge. 1857. OCLC 669949611.	Being Historical Reminiscences of the Late War: With the Plain Art of Cookery for Military and Civil Institutions, the Army, Navy, Public, etc

== Notes, references and sources ==
=== Sources ===
==== Books ====
- Brandon, Ruth (2004). The People's Chef. London: Wiley. ISBN 978-0-470-86991-8.
- Ceserani, Victor; Ronald Kinton (1974). Practical Cookery (fourth ed.). London: Edward Arnold. ISBN 978-0-7131-1853-7.
- Cowen, Ruth (2006). Relish: The Extraordinary Life of Alexis Soyer, Victorian Celebrity Chef. London: Weidenfeld and Nicolson. ISBN 978-0-297-64562-7.
- David, Elizabeth (2001). Norman, Jill (ed.). Is There a Nutmeg in the House?. London: Viking Penguin. ISBN 978-0-670-03033-0.
- Escoffier, Auguste (1970). Ma cuisine: 2500 recettes (in French). Paris: Flammarion. ISBN 978-2-08-200018-5.
- Kelly, Ian (2004). Cooking for Kings: The Life of Antonin Carême, the First Celebrity Chef. London: Short. ISBN 978-1-904095-93-4.
- Langley, Andrew (1987). The Selected Soyer. Bath: Absolute Press. ISBN 978-0-948230-10-3.
- Leith, Prue (1980). Leith's Cookery Course. London: Fontana. ISBN 978-0-00-635272-3.
- Mars, Valerie (2013). "Experiencing French cookery in Nineteenth-century London". In Kelly, Debra; Martyn Cornick (eds.). A History of the French in London. London: University of London Press. pp. 217–240. ISBN 978-1-909646-48-3. JSTOR j.ctv512xmz.18.
- Morris, Helen (2013) [1938]. Portrait of a Chef. Cambridge: Cambridge University Press. ISBN 978-1-108-06169-8.
- Nightingale, Florence (1858). Notes on Matters Affecting the Health, Efficiency, and Hospital Administration of the British Army. London: Harrison. OCLC 27435325.
- Quayle, Eric (1978). Old Cook Books: An Illustrated History. London: Cassell. ISBN 978-0-289-70707-4.
- Ray, Elizabeth (1995). "Introduction II: Campaign Food". A Culinary Campaign. Lewes: Southover. ISBN 978-1-870962-11-7.
- Soyer, Alexis (1854). A Shilling Cookery for the People: Embracing an Entirely New System of Plain Cookery and Domestic Economy. London: Routledge. OCLC 1157227860.
- Soyer, Alexis (1995) [1857]. A Culinary Campaign. Lewes: Southover. ISBN 978-1-870962-11-7.
- Swift, Roger (2017). Charles Pelham Villiers: Aristocratic Victorian Radical. London: Taylor & Francis. ISBN 978-1-35-197468-4.
- Volant, François; J. R. Warren (1859). Memoirs of Alexis Soyer: With Unpublished Receipts and Odds and Ends of Gastronomy. London: W. Kent. OCLC 970773248.
- Willan, Anne (1992). Great Cooks and their Recipes. London: Pavilion Books. ISBN 978-1-85145-596-6.

==== Web ====
- Clement-Lorford, Frank (2001). Alexis Soyer: The First Celebrity Chef. Guildford: Academia.edu.
