= Emma Soyer =

British painter (1813–1842)

Emma Jones Soyer
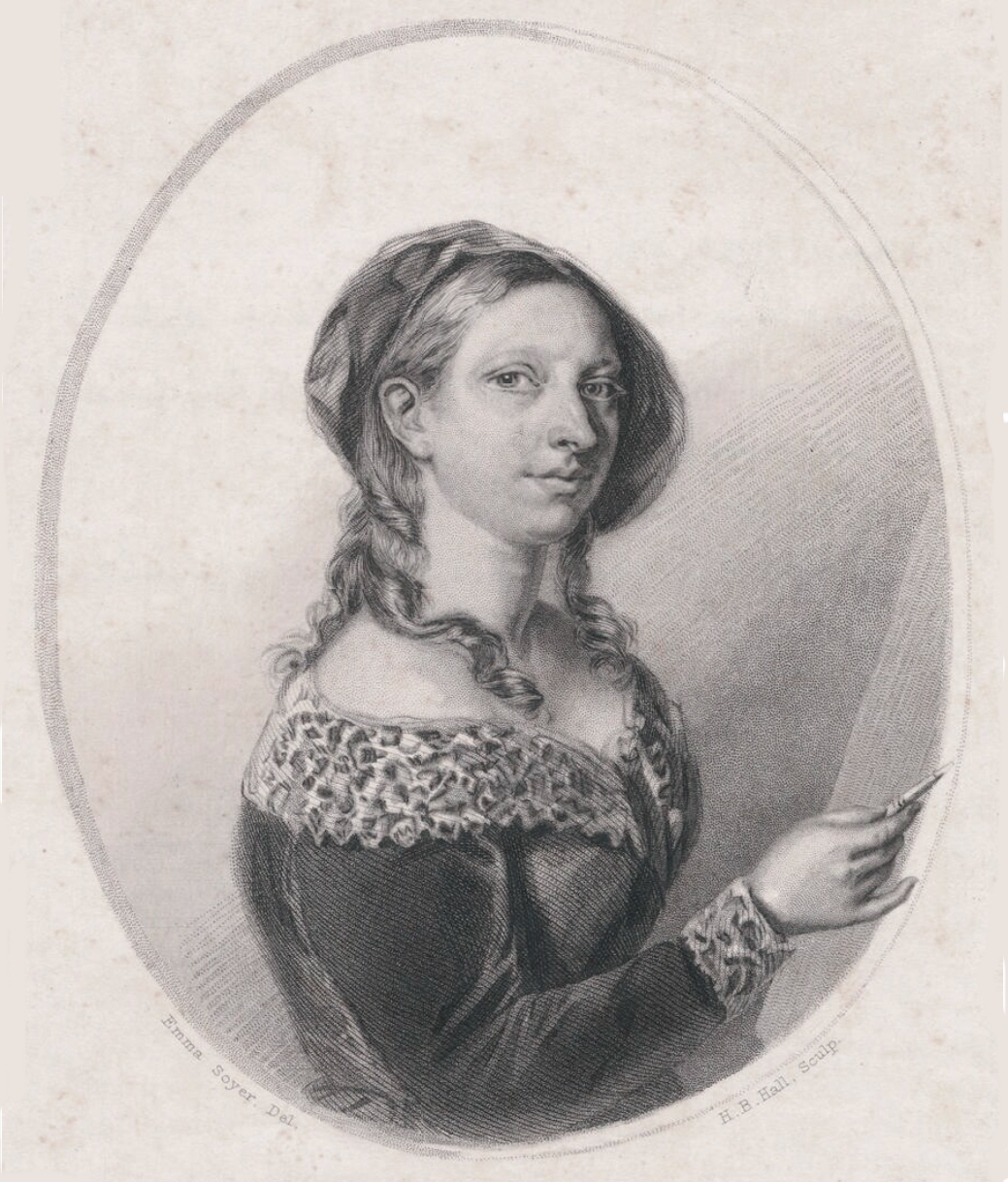
- Self-portrait, engraved by H. B. Hall
- Born: Elizabeth Emma Jones; 5 September 1813; London, England
- Died: 30 August 1842 (aged 28); London, England
- Resting place: Kensal Green Cemetery, London
- Known for: Portraiture, genre scene
- Notable work: Two Black Children with a Book; Watercress Woman; Portrait of Alexis Soyer; The Grandmother at Her Spinning Wheel
- Spouse: Alexis Soyer (m. 1837)
- Relatives: François Simonau, teacher and stepfather

Elizabeth Emma Soyer, née Jones (5 September 1813 – 30 August 1842) was an English painter, known as Emma Jones or Emma Soyer.

== Biography ==
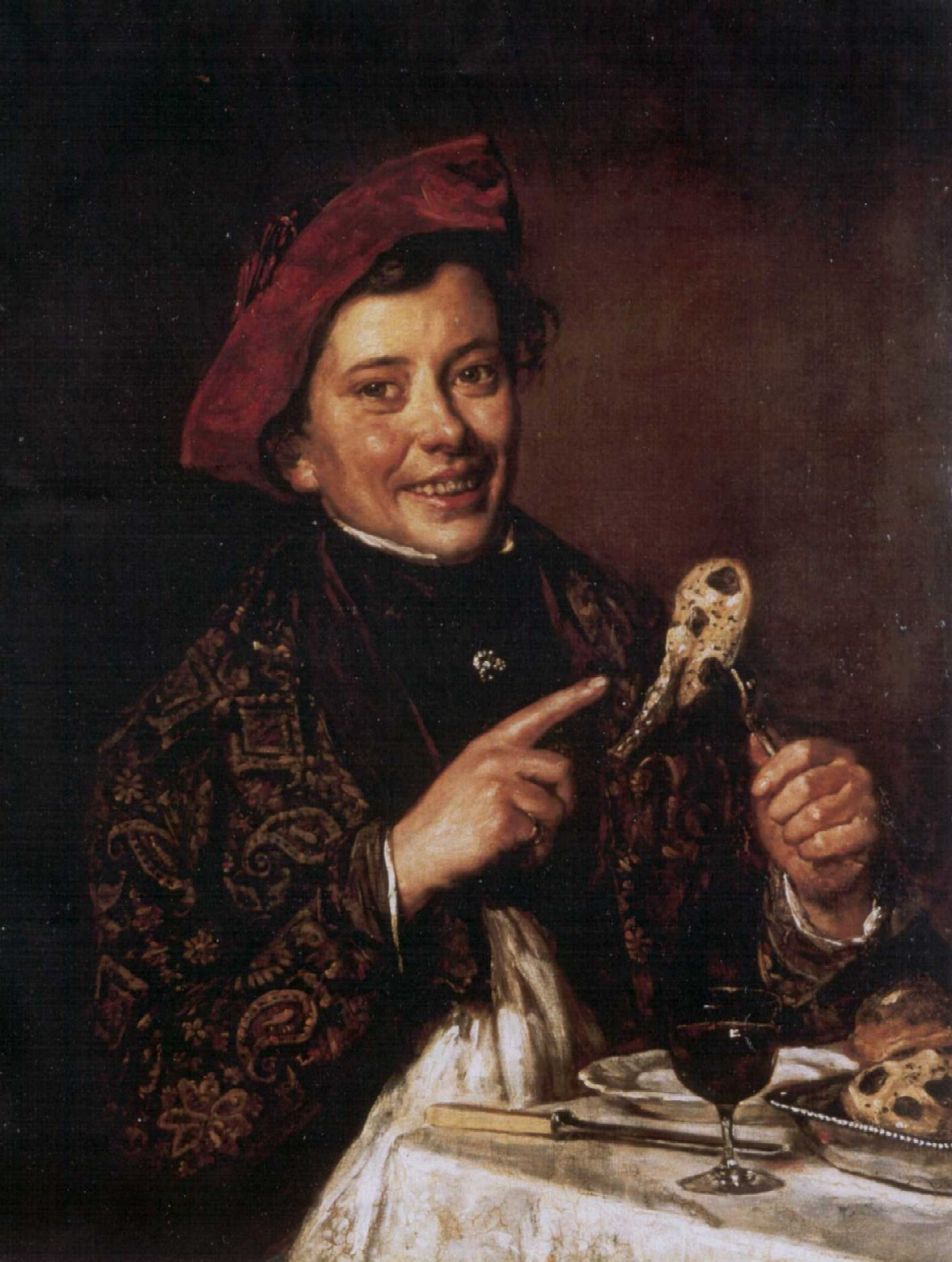
Emma Soyer, Portrait of Alexis Soyer, 1841 (private collection, on loan to the Reform Club)

Elizabeth Emma Jones was born in London in 1813, and was instructed in French, Italian, and music. At a very early age she became a pupil of the Belgian painter François Simonau (1783–1859), who in 1820 married her mother, Mrs. Jones. Finding that Emma had talents for drawing, Simoneau devoted the whole of his time to her instruction, and before the age of twelve she "had drawn more than a hundred portraits from life with great fidelity". She also became a talented pianist under the tutelage of Jean Ancot.

On 12 April 1837, she married Alexis Soyer, the first senior chef at the Reform Club. She then turned her attention to portraits in oil, and, with Simoneau, travelled in the provinces, working in Canterbury, Ramsgate and Shrewsbury and gained great popularity. Upon her return to London, she produced "The Blind Boy", "The Crossing Sweeper", "The Bavarians", "Taglioni" and the "Kentish Ceres". In 1842 she completed her last work, "The Two Organ Boys". She also showed two paintings at the 1842 Paris Salon ("L'aveugle de la tour de Londres" and "Portrait de M. Soyer" - Nos. 1729–30). Her portrait of Soyer was engraved by Henry Bryan Hall.

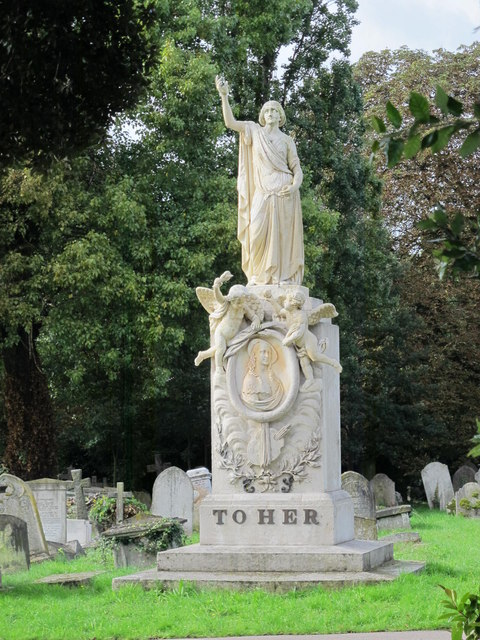
Monument at Kensal Green Cemetery

On 29–30 August 1842, she had complications with her pregnancy, owing to fright produced by a thunderstorm, and she died the same night at her residence near Charing Cross, London. She was buried at Kensal Green Cemetery, London, on 8 September, where her husband erected a large monument to her memory. It is now Grade II* listed, giving it legal protection from unlawful modification or demolition.

In her obituary, The Gentleman's Magazine described her as "Cut off when her reputation was about to make her fortune, and when, in spite of all obstacles, her merits were become known to her countrymen".

Between 1823 and 1843, fourteen of her pictures were exhibited at the Royal Academy, thirty-eight at the British Institution, and fourteen at the Suffolk Street Gallery (Graves, Dictionary of Artists, pp. 130, 221).

In June 1848, one hundred and forty of her works were exhibited at the Prince of Wales's bazaar, under the name of Soyer's Philanthropic Gallery, on behalf of the Spitalfields soup kitchen, and a catalogue was printed. Among these pictures was "The Young Savoyards Resting", a work which obtained for Madame Soyer the name of the "English Murillo". Two of her pieces, "The Jew Lemon Boys" and "The English Ceres", were engraved by Gérard. In Paris, where many of her pictures were exhibited, her reputation stood higher than in her native country.

== Legacy ==
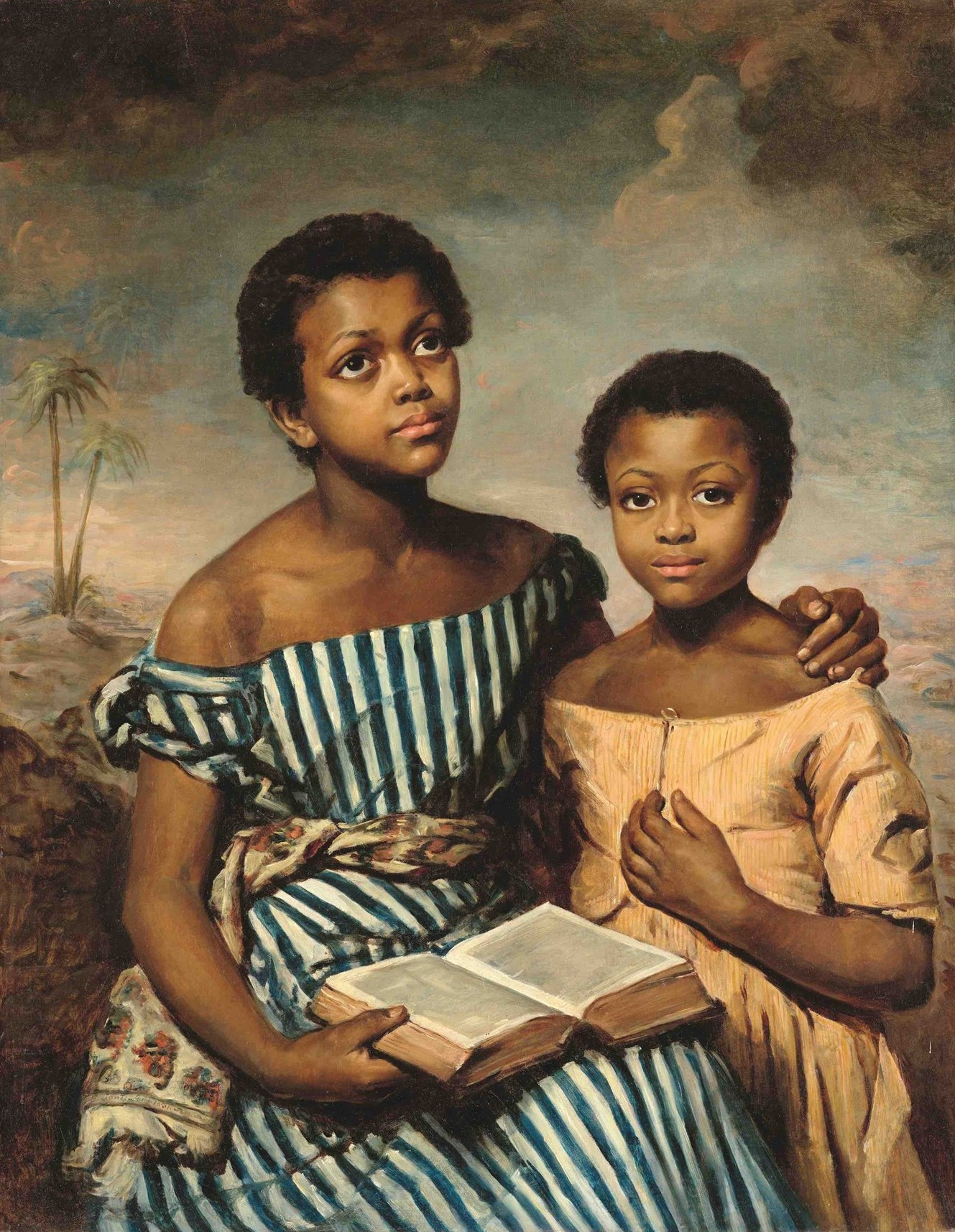
Emma Jones (later Soyer), Two Children with a Book, 1831, (private collection, on loan to the Tate Britain since 2022)

In September 2018 Soyer's painting of two black girls, in a tropical landscape, possibly painted for the slavery abolitionist cause in Britain, was featured on the BBC One television programme Fake or Fortune?. The picture is on long term loan to the Tate Britain since 2022.

The artwork and Soyer herself are mentioned in Zadie Smith's 2023 novel The Fraud.

Her portrait of Alexis Soyer is in the collection of the Reform club (on loan from a private collection).

== Gallery ==
Works by Emma Soyer

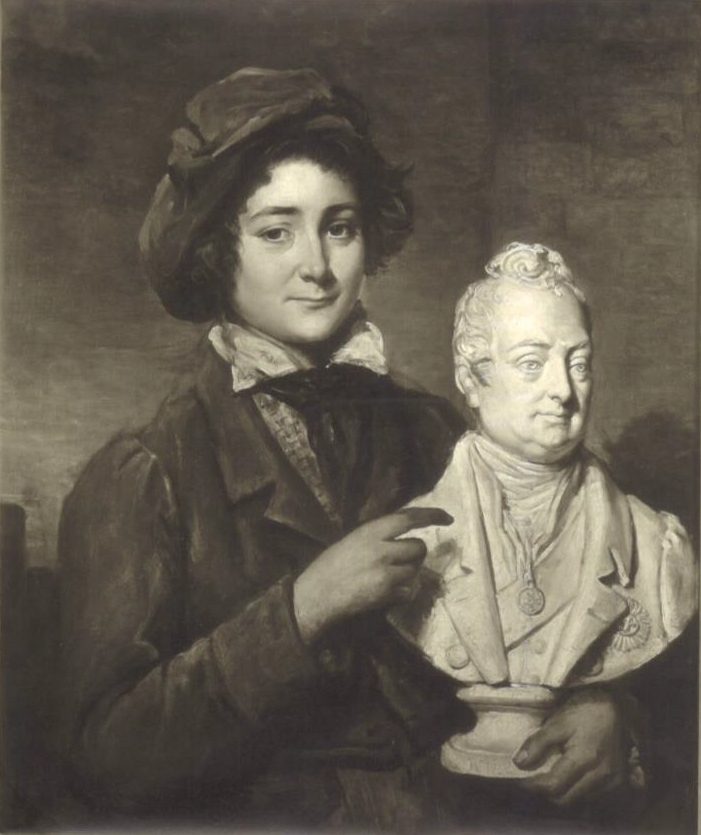
A Young Italian with a Bust of William IV, 1831, exhibited at the British Institution, 1832 (black and white reproduction).

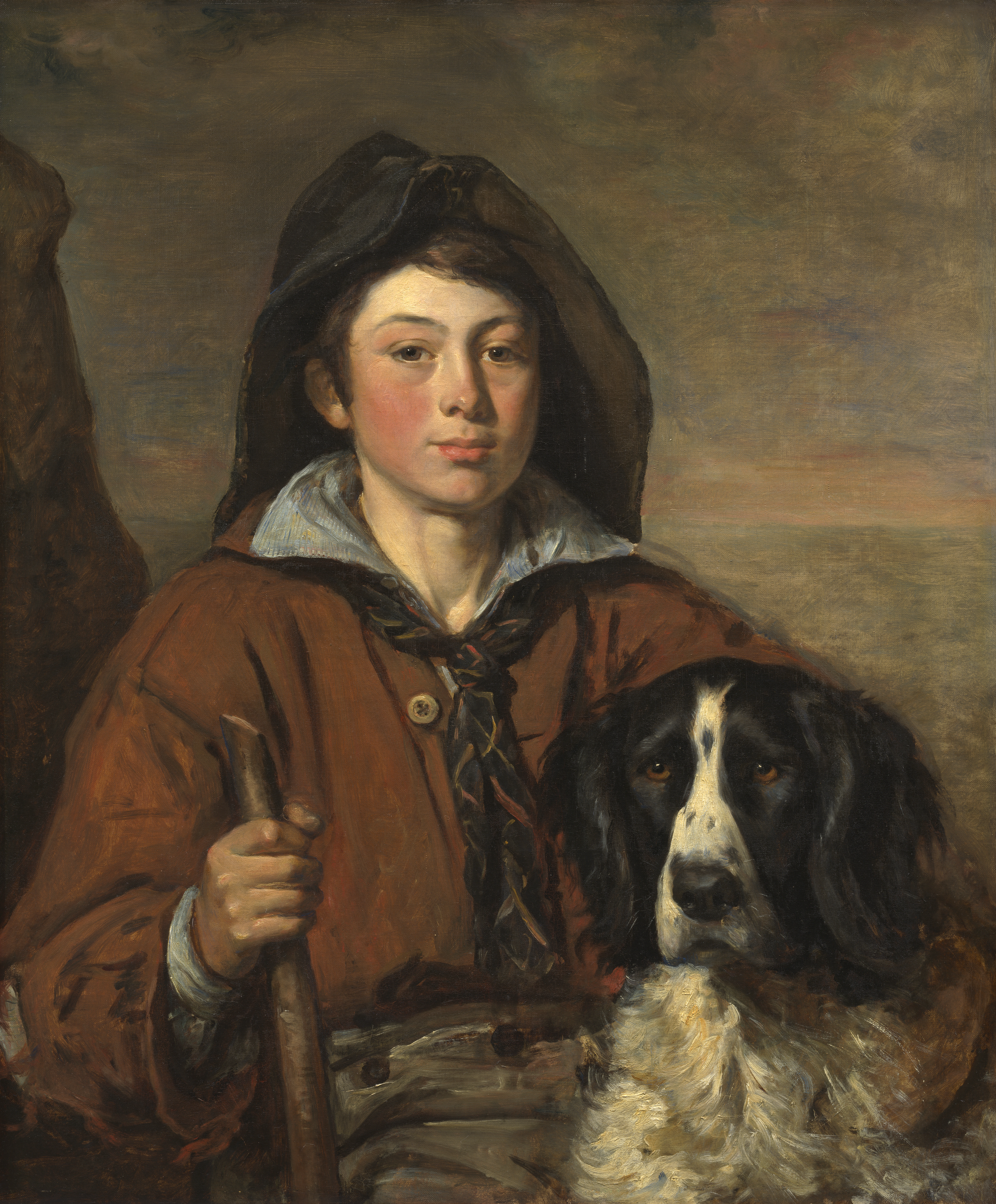
Young Mariner and Dog, 1833 (New Haven, Yale Center for British Art)

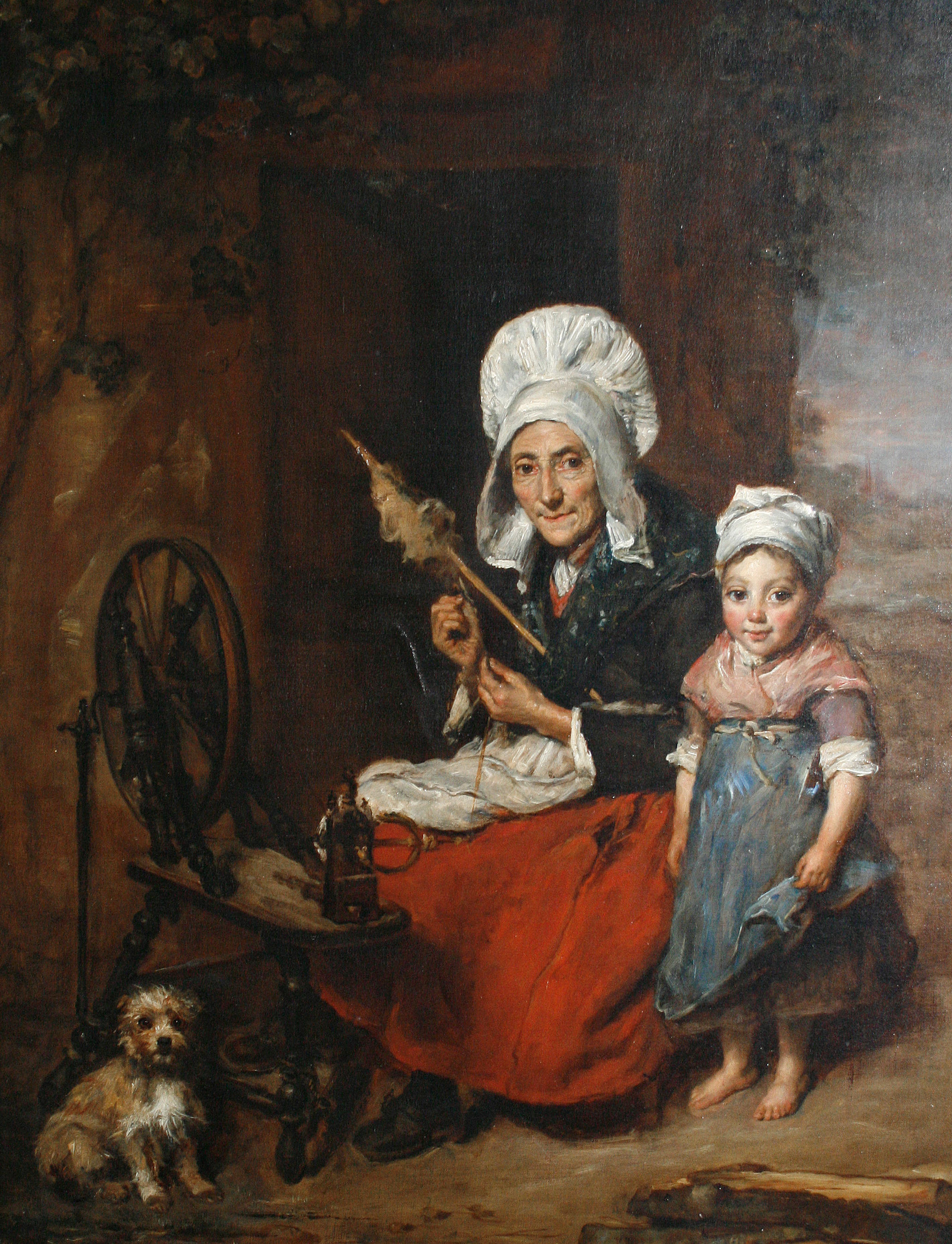
The Grandmother at her Spinning Wheel, 1835 (private collection)

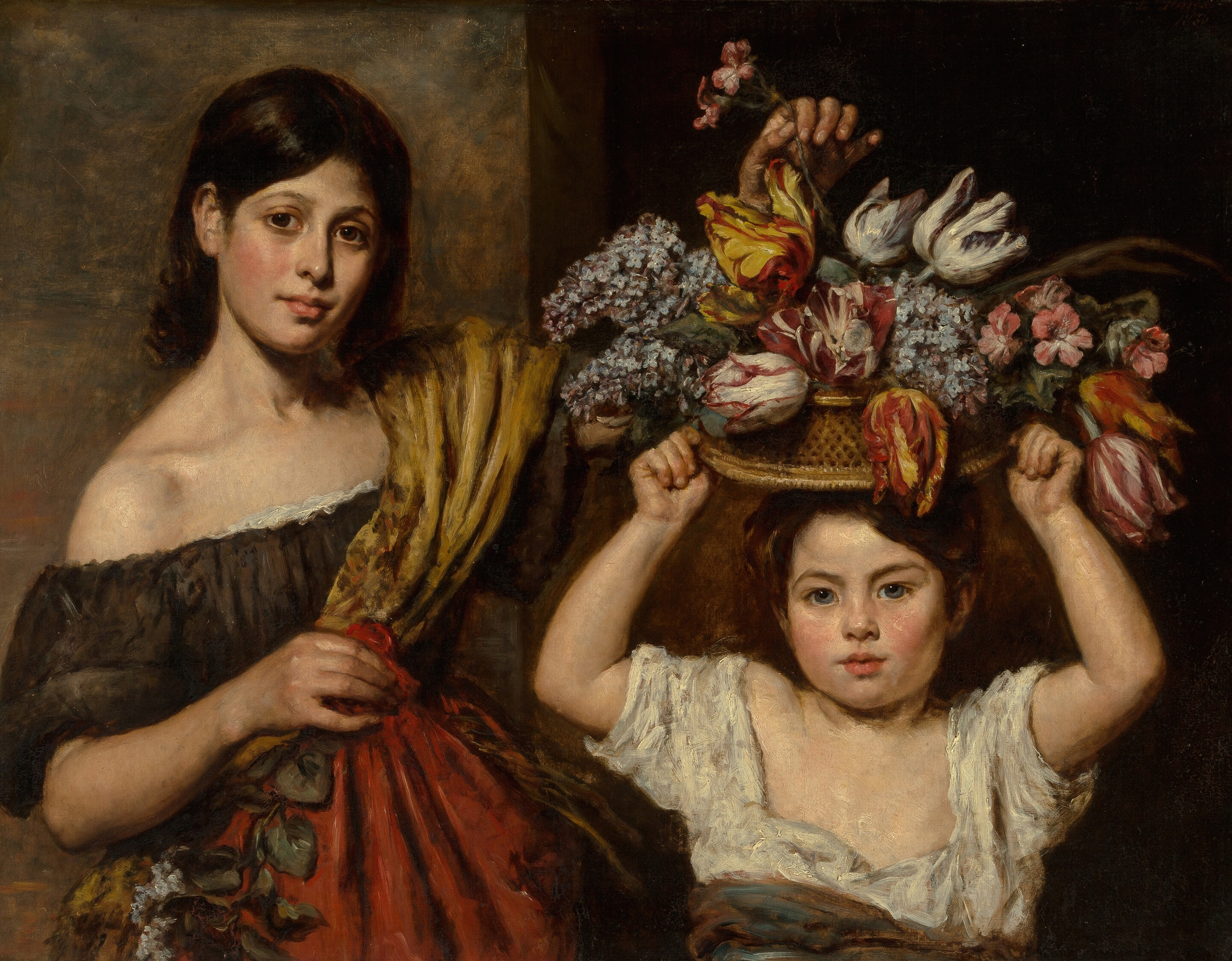
Two Children with Flowers, 1836 (private collection)

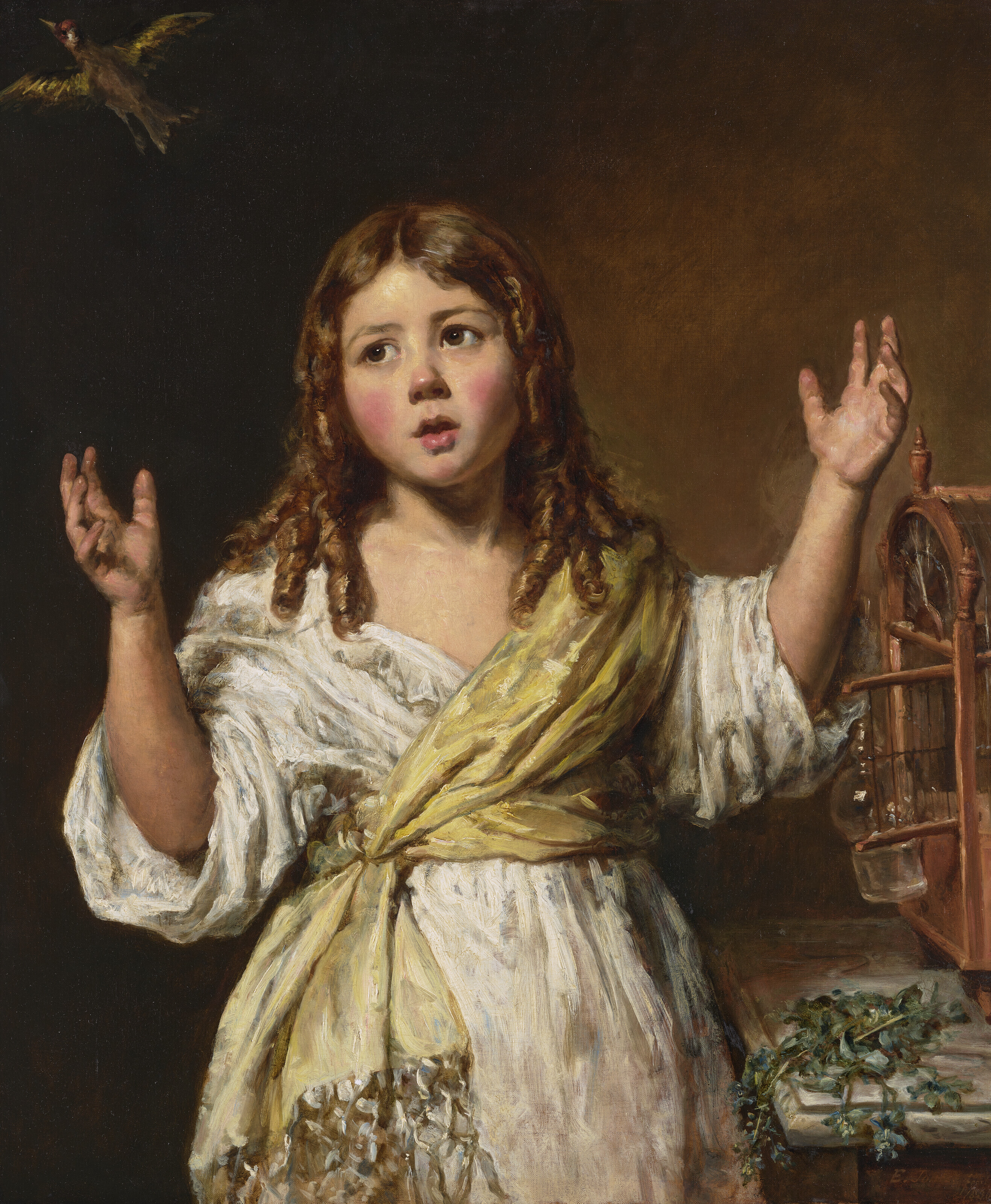
The Escape, 1836 (Melbourne, National Gallery of Victoria)

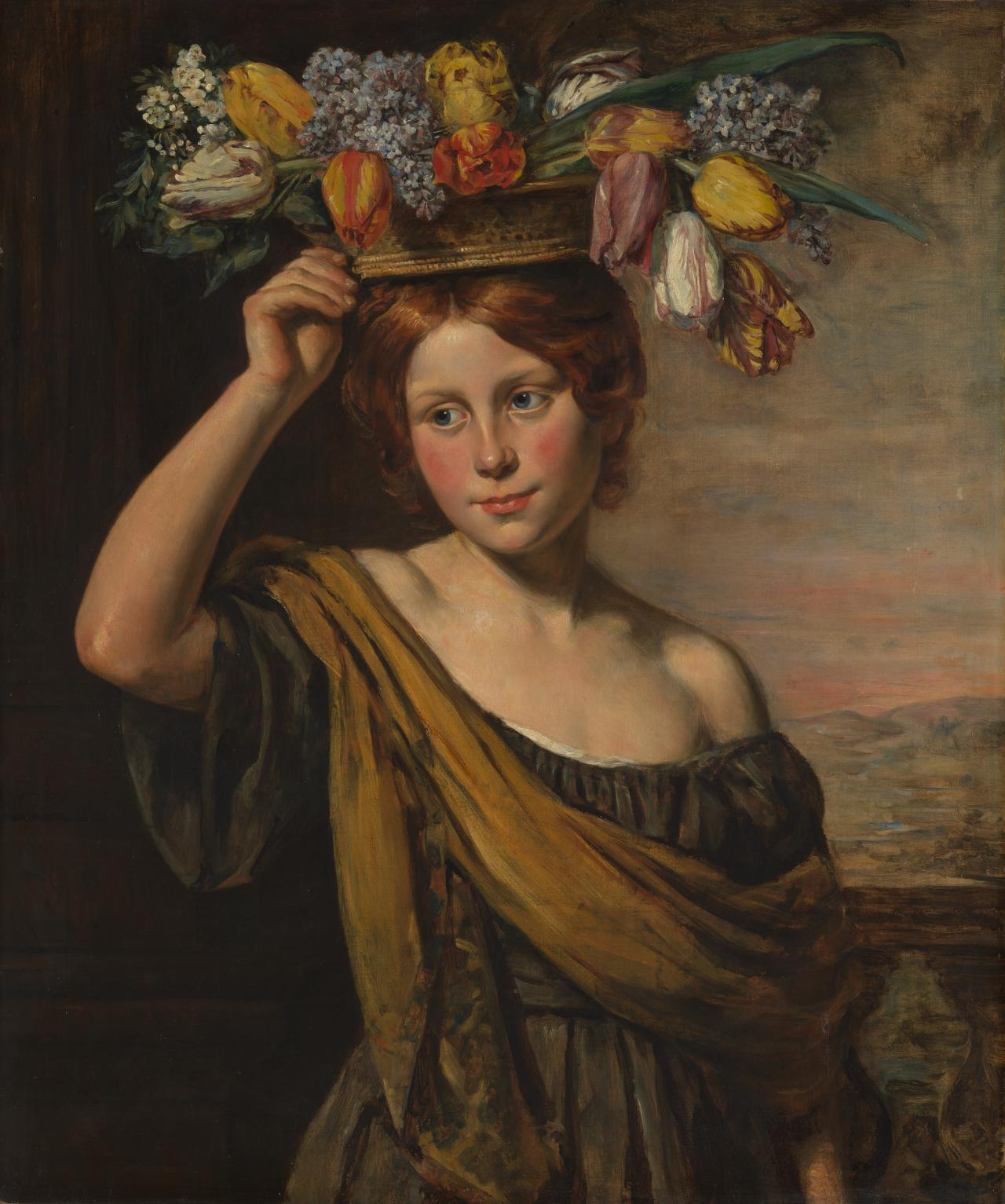
A girl with a basket of tulips, lilacs and other flowers, on a balcony before a landscape, c. 1836, (Melbourne, National Gallery of Victoria)

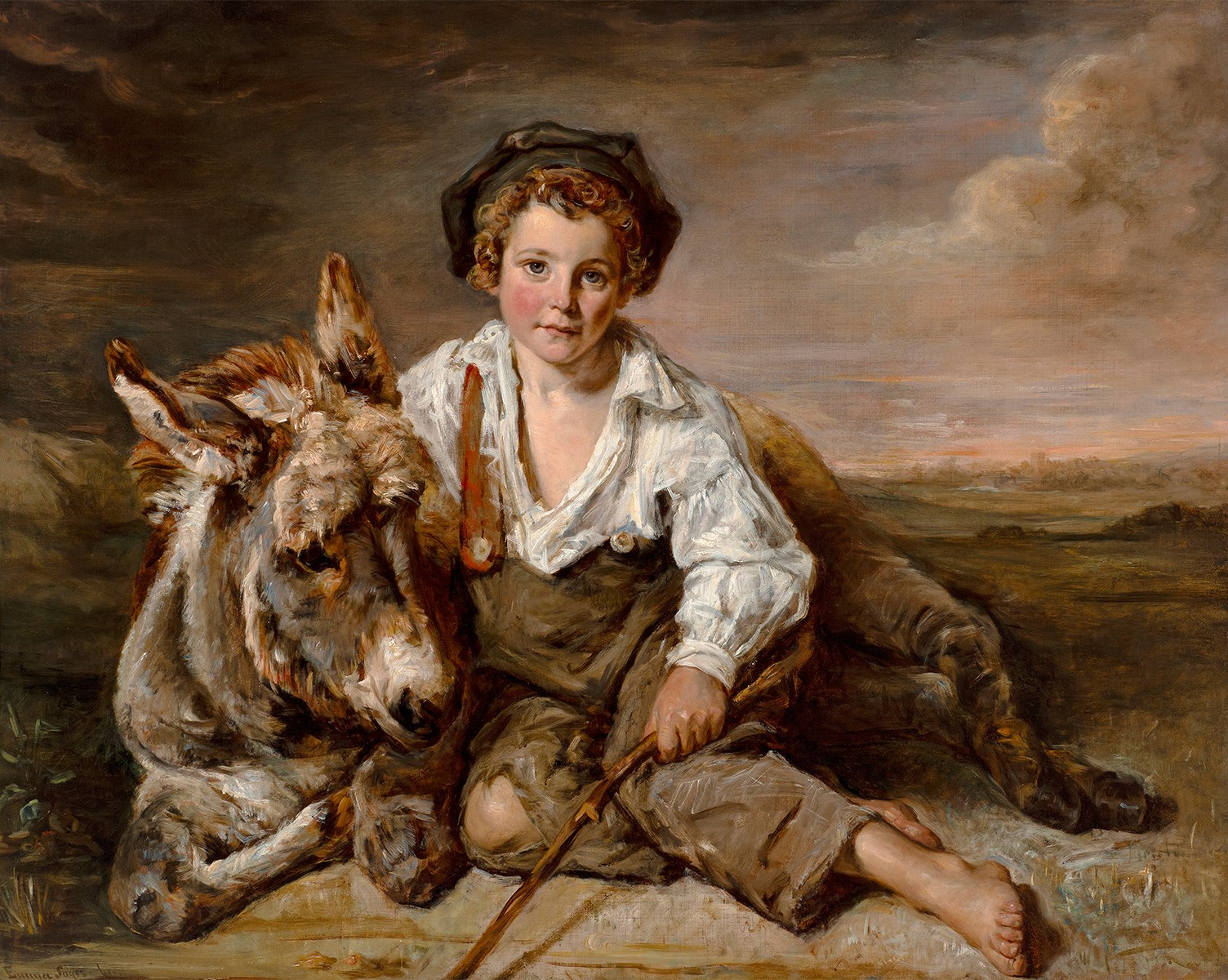
The Two Inseparables, 1837 (private collection)

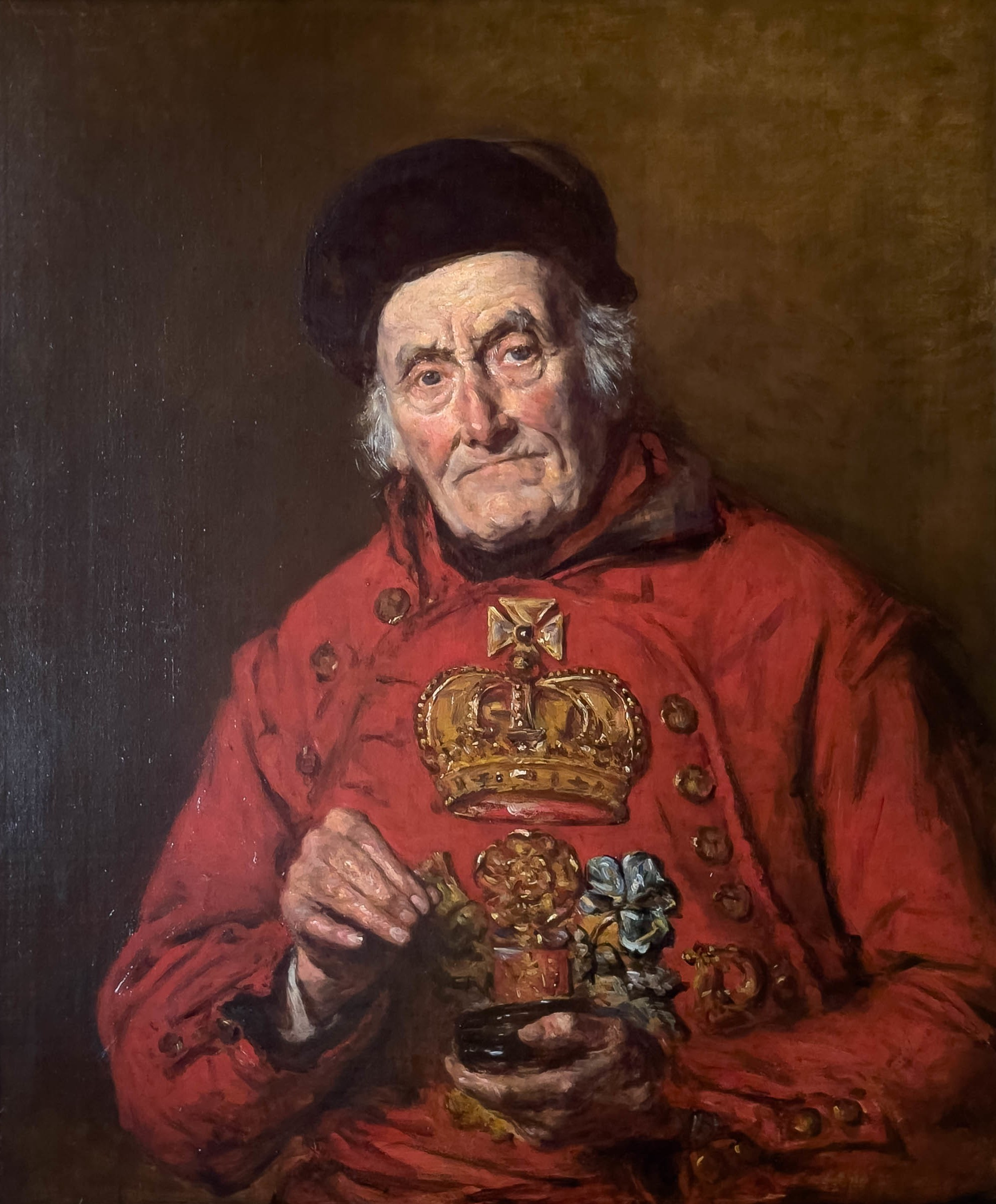
Portrait of William Timms, the Waterman, aged 95, 1838 (Syon House, Duke of Northumberland's collection)

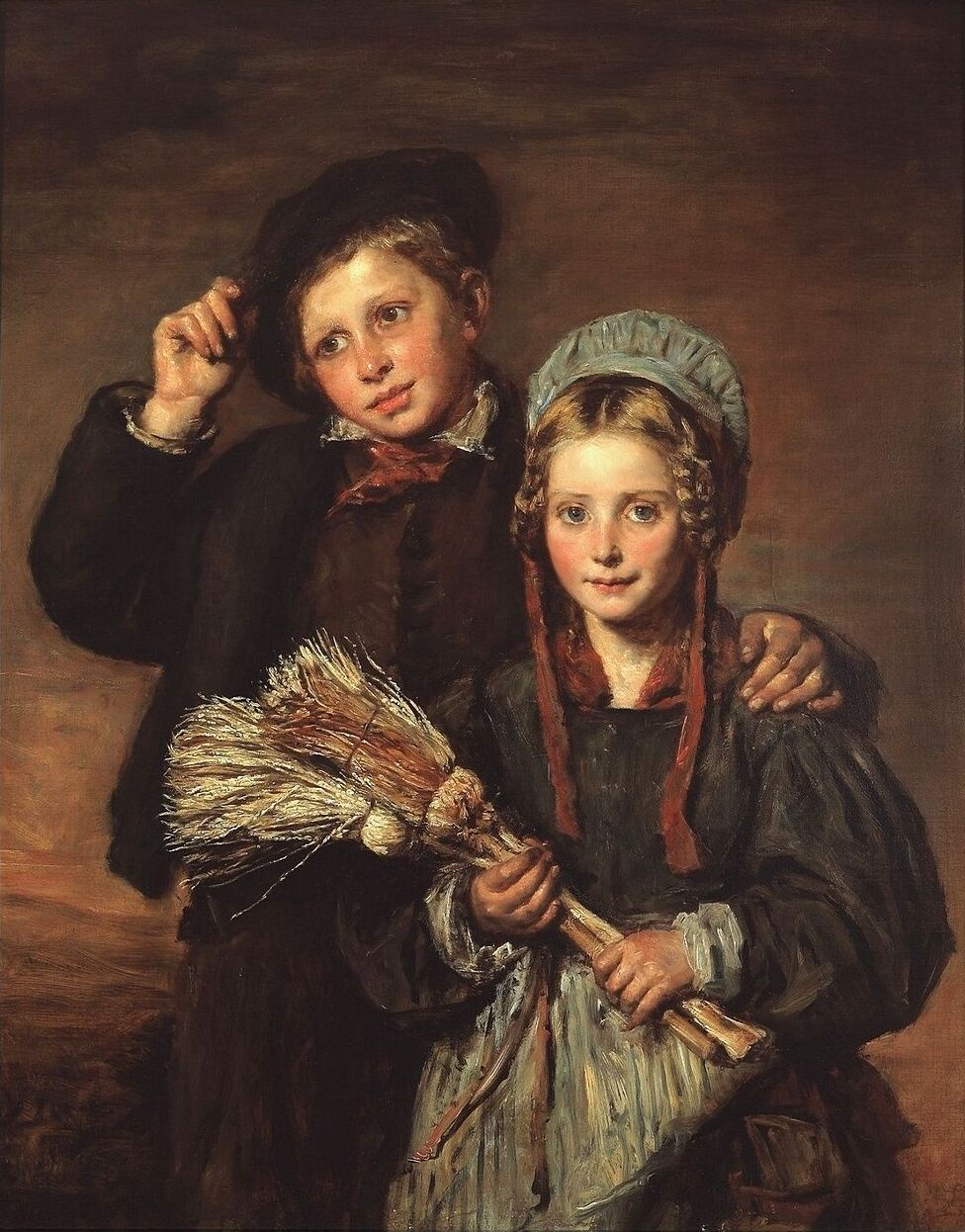
Young Bavarians, c. 1838, Rollins Museum of Art

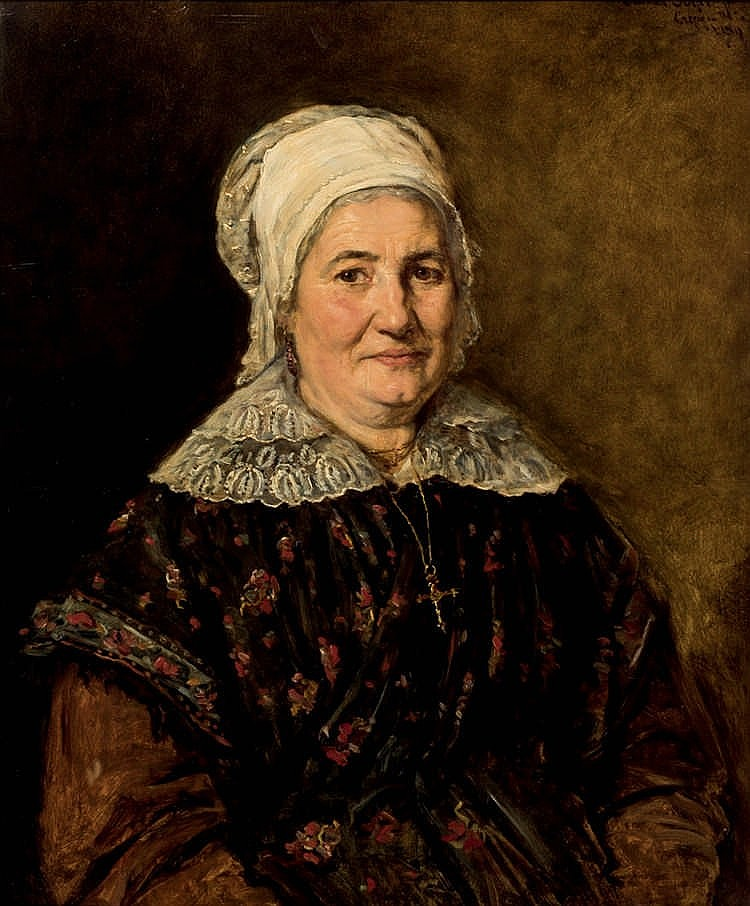
Portrait of a woman, 1839 (private collection)

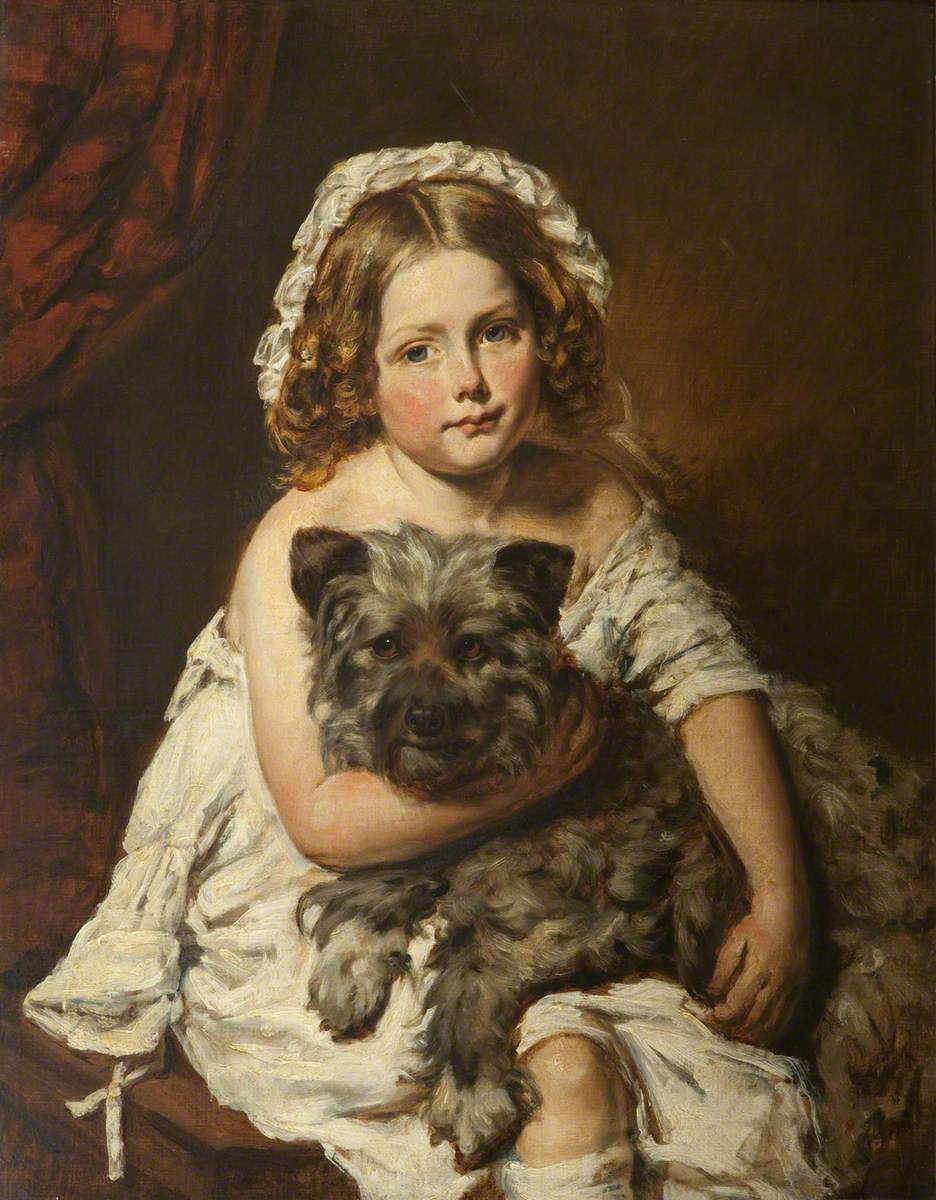
Girl Nursing a Skye Terrier (Young Girl with a Dog), Towneley Hall Art Gallery And Museum

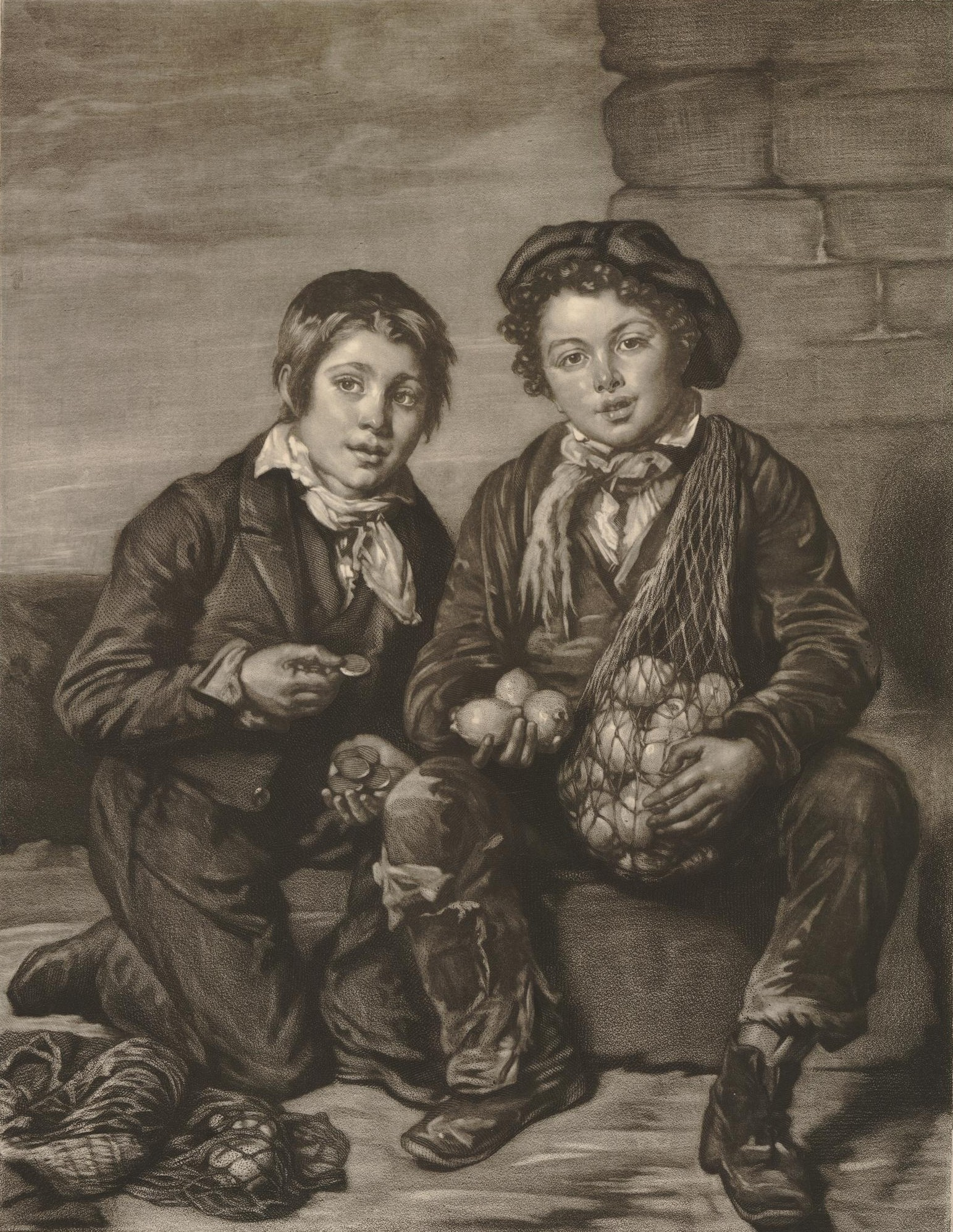
The Young Israelites, engraving after Soyer's painting

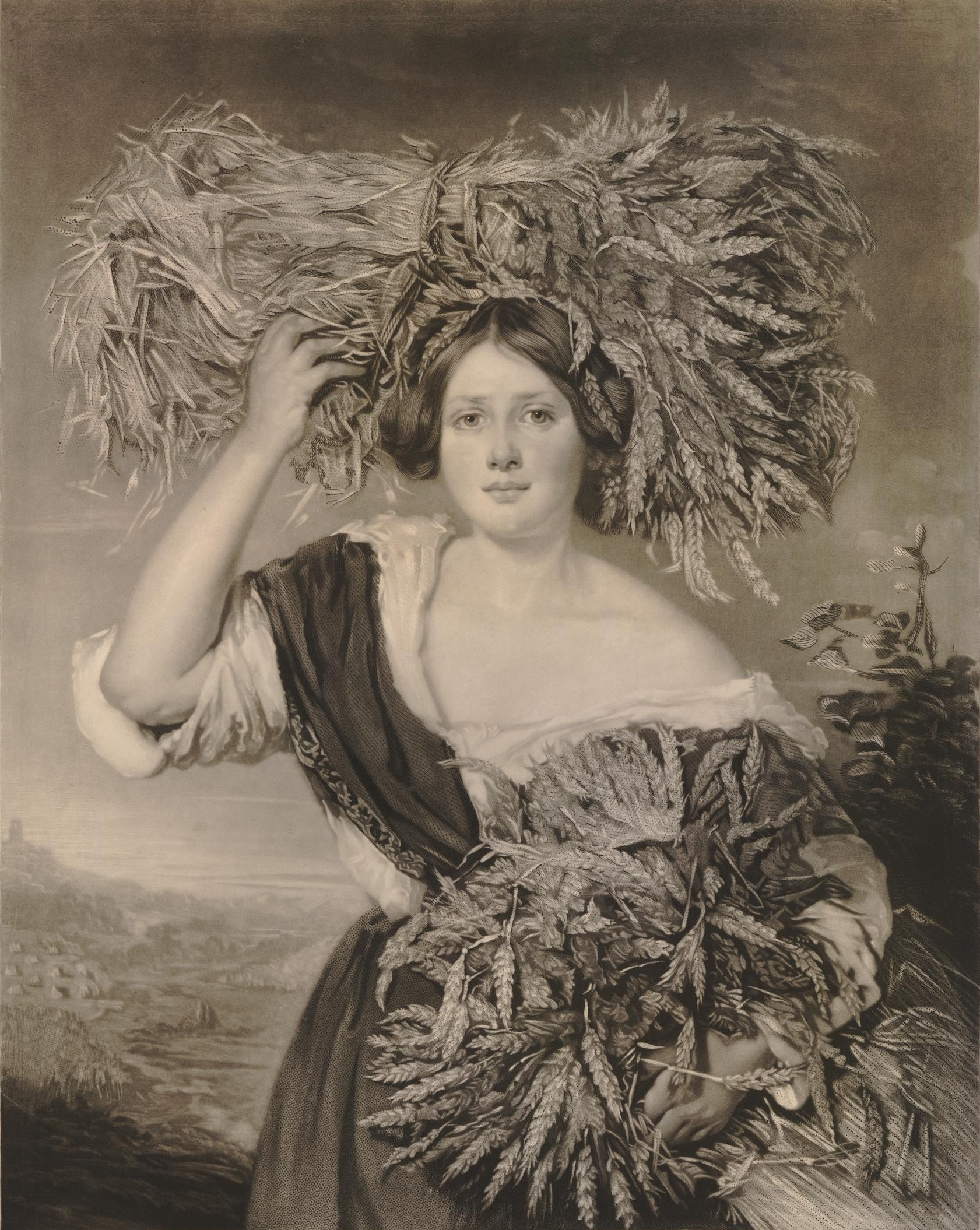
The English Ceres, engraving after Soyer's painting

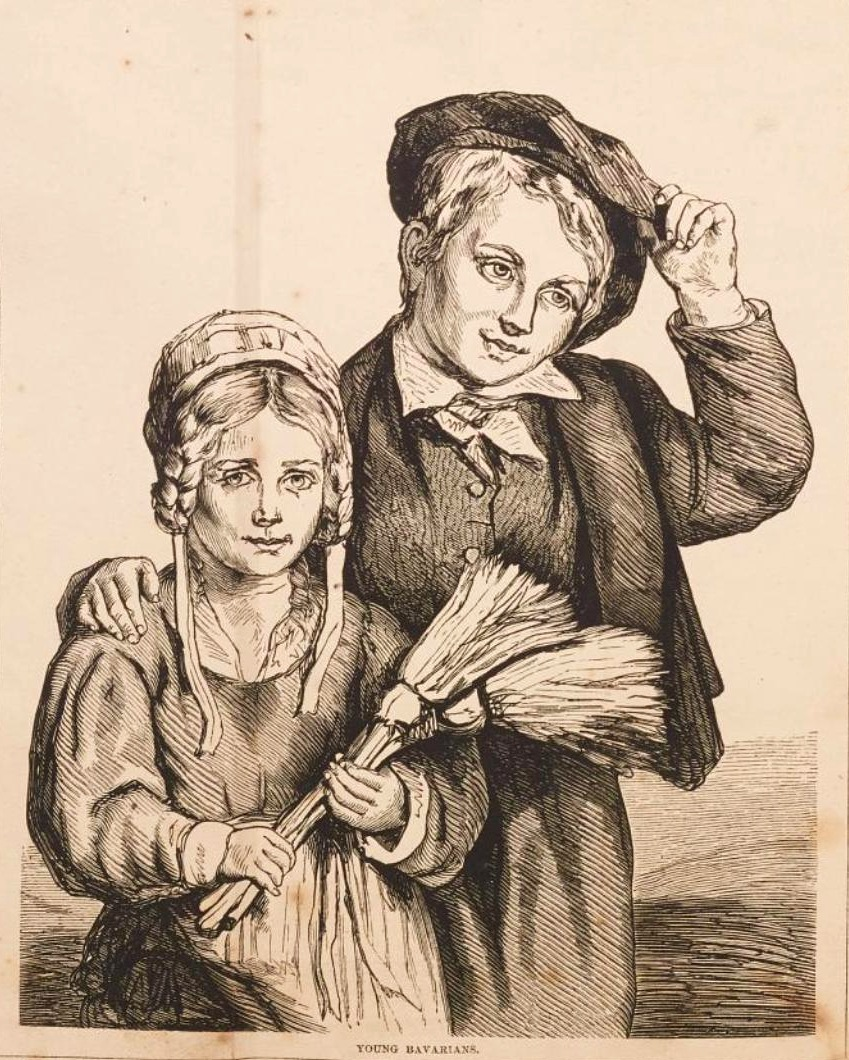
Young Bavarians or A Buy-a-Broom Girl and Her Brother, engraving after Soyer's painting
