= François Simonau =

Belgium-born painter (1783–1859)

- Born: François Simonau; 26 May 1783; Bornhem, Austrian Netherlands
- Died: 26 November 1859 (aged 76); London U.K.
- Occupation: Painter

Three portraits by Simonau

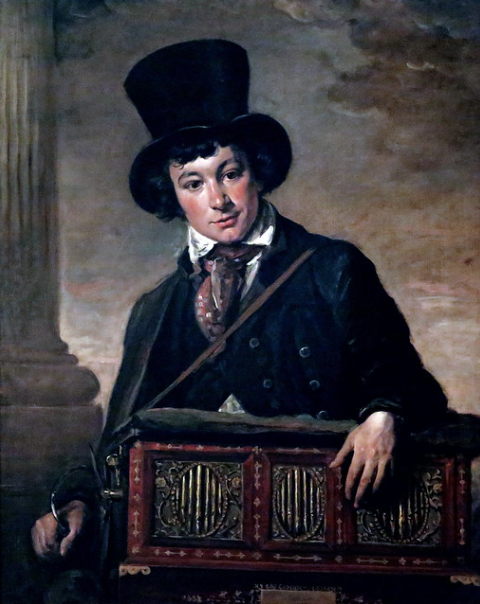
"The Organ Player"

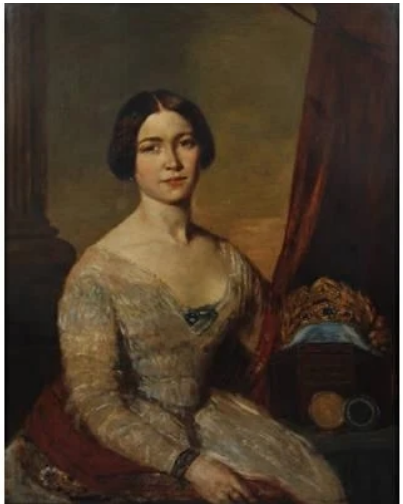
Fanny Cerrito

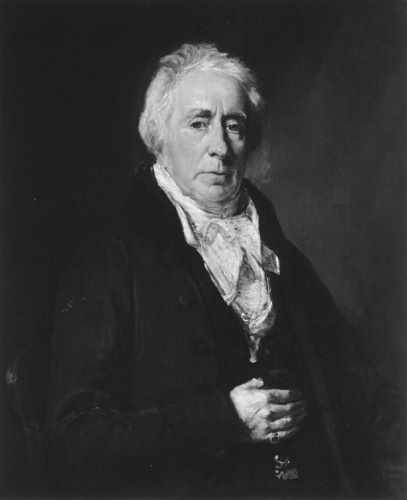
Portrait of an unnamed man

François Simonau (26 May 1783 – 26 November 1859) was a painter, born in what is now Belgium, who made his career in London. He was the teacher, and later stepfather, of Emma Soyer.

== Life and career ==
Simonau was born in Bornhem, Austrian Netherlands on 26 May 1783. He studied in Bruges (with either Robert Frickx or Bernard Fricx, according to different sources) and between 1808 and 1812 was a pupil of Antoine-Jean Gros in Paris. In 1815 he settled in London together with his brother Pierre. The latter established a successful lithographic business; François concentrated on portrait-painting, with the help of Sir Thomas Lawrence, who introduced him to London society. He prospered, and exhibited at the Royal Academy and the British Institution from 1818.

Simonau supplemented his commissions with a small but flourishing art school in Commercial Road, east of the City of London. Among his pupils was Emma Jones. In 1818 her mother, Elizabeth Jones, a wealthy widow, offered Simonau sufficient financial inducement to drop his other students and concentrate entirely on her daughter. In 1820 Simonau and Elizabeth Jones were married. They settled in Greek Street, Soho, with Emma and her brother Newton.

In 1835 the chef Alexis Soyer asked Simonau to paint his portrait; Simoneau delegated the task to his stepdaughter. Soyer fell in love with her, she soon reciprocated, and to Simonau's chagrin – "a mere cook!" – they married in 1837. After Elizabeth Simonau died in 1839 Simonau went to live with the Soyers at their flat in Charing Cross Road.

Simonau outlived his stepdaughter and her husband, and in his last years was in reduced circumstances. Lord Palmerston arranged a pension for him. He died on 26 November 1859; as he had wished, he was buried at Kensal Green cemetery alongside his stepdaughter and her husband.

== Works ==
According to Grove Art Online, the neo-classical style was predominant in painting in Belgium in Simonau's early years, but he distanced himself from it, partly because of his training with Gros in Paris and partly under the influence of the art of his adopted country:

He adopted the broad technique and the specific colouring of English portrait painters. His virtuosity increased in the works of his maturity, which were particularly exuberant in their handling.

Léonce Bénédite, in La peinture au 19iéme siècle (1909) wrote:

In the Museum of Brussels there is a portrait [by Simonau] of a man, a strong, impasto painting, with the warm colours and the beautiful dazzling whites of Reynolds, and above all the excellent work "The Organ Player", dated 1828, robust, frank, beautifully painted, reminiscent of Franz Hals.

Bénédite added that it was perhaps to Gros that Simonau owes the warmth of his colour.

=== Sources ===
- Bénédite, Léonce (1909). La peinture au 19iéme siècle. Paris: Flammarion. OCLC 697946533.
- Cowen, Ruth (2006). Relish: The Extraordinary Life of Alexis Soyer, Victorian Celebrity Chef. London: Weidenfeld and Nicolson. ISBN 978-0-297-64562-7.
- Zeiger-Viallet, Henri; Jacques Busse (2010). Benezit Dictionary of Artists. Oxford: Oxford University Press. ISBN 978-0-19-977378-7.
