= Jean Ancot Snr =

Belgian composer and teacher (1776–1848)

Jean Ancot (22 October 1776 – 12 July 1848) was a Belgian composer and teacher.

== Life ==
Ancot was born in Bruges in 1776. As a choirboy at Bruges Cathedral, he had lessons in singing and violin with Abbé Cramene, and harpsichord lessons with the organist Thienpont. He entered the Conservatoire de Paris in 1799, and studied violin with Rodolphe Kreutzer and Pierre Baillot, and harmony with Jean-Joseph Rodolphe and Charles-Simon Catel. In 1804 he returned to settle in Bruges, where he was a teacher of piano and violin.

=== Family ===
In 1797 in Bruges he married Françoise Albertine de Reus (1776–1800); they had a son, musician Jean Ancot. In 1802 in Bruges he married Colette de Reus (1782–1820), and they had a son, pianist Louis Ancot.

== Compositions ==
The Biographie universelle des musiciens by François-Joseph Fétis lists four violin concertos and four other pieces for violin and orchestra; three string quartets; two masses, and other sacred music; and various minor works.
