= Temporary Relief Act 1847 =

Act of the Parliament of the United Kingdom

- Act of Parliament
- Parliament of the United Kingdom
- Long title: An Act for the temporary Relief of destitute Persons in Ireland.
- Citation: 10 & 11 Vict. c. 7
- Territorial extent: Ireland (Note: Section 23.)

Dates
- Royal assent: 23 February 1847
- Commencement: 23 February 1847 (Note: The Acts of Parliament (Commencement) Act 1793.)
- Repealed: 11 August 1875
Other legislation
| Repealed by | Statute Law Revision Act 1875 |
| Relates to | Poor Employment (Ireland) Act 1846 |

Status: Repealed

Text of statute as originally enacted

The Temporary Relief Act 1847 (10 & 11 Vict. c. 7) also known as the Soup Kitchen Act was an act of the Parliament of the United Kingdom passed in February 1847.

The act allowed the establishment of soup kitchens in Ireland to relieve pressure from the overstretched Poor Law system, which could not adequately feed people suffering from the Great famine. The act drew inspiration for its public–private soup kitchen programme from Skibbereen, one of the areas hardest hit by the famine during the winter of 1846–47.

== Subsequent developments ==
The whole act was repealed by section 1 of, and the schedule to, the Statute Law Revision Act 1875 (38 & 39 Vict. c. 66), which came into force on 11 August 1875.

== See also ==
- Irish Poor Law Extension Acts
- Irish Poor Laws
