= Jean Ancot Jnr =

Belgian violinist and composer

Jean Ancot (6 July 1799 – 5 June 1829) was a violinist, pianist and composer from what was then the Netherlands.

== Life ==
He was born in Bruges, a son of Jean Ancot (1776-1848), a composer and teacher. He learned to play the violin and piano from his father, and aged 12 he played in public, playing Viotti's 12th violin concerto and Steibelt's 3rd piano concerto.

In 1817, Ancot was admitted to the Conservatoire de Paris, and studied the piano with Louis-Barthélémy Pradher and composition with Henri-Montan Berton. François-Joseph Fétis wrote: "Endowed with a happier disposition, he could have placed himself at a high rank among the young artists of his time, but strong passions did not let him give all the required rigor to his studies".

He married Caroline Fanny De Grenier in 1822 at Boulogne-sur-Mer. In 1823, he went to London, where he became director and professor of the Athenaeum, and was pianist to the Duchess of Kent. He returned to Belgium in 1825, and in Brussels gave prestigious concerts with his brother Louis Ancot, a pianist: they took place at the Belgian court on 21 September 1825, and at the Vauxhall on 11 March 1826. He settled in Boulogne-sur-Mer, where he gave lessons. He died there in 1829.

== Compositions ==
Ancot composed and arranged more than 200 works, published in Paris, London and Germany. They include compositions for violin and/or piano, and orchestral works.
