= Henry Bryan Hall =

British artist

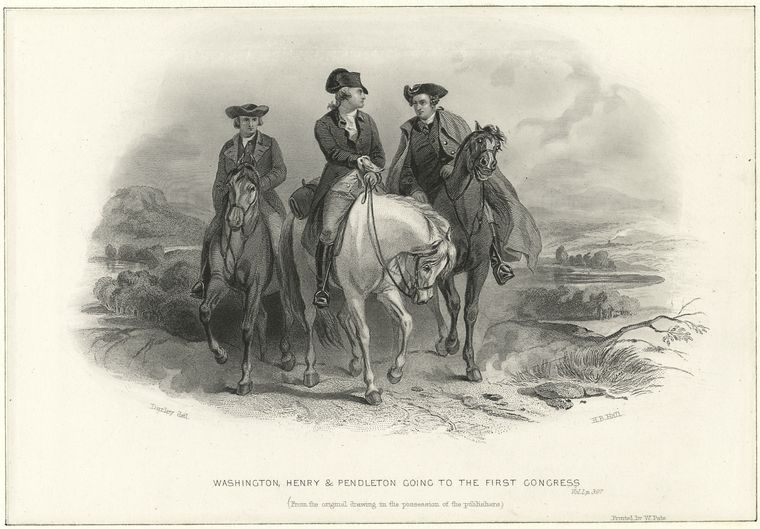
Hall's lithograph, Washington, Henry & Pendleton going to the First Congress, depicting George Washington, Patrick Henry, and Edmund Pendleton traveling to the First Continental Congress in Philadelphia in 1774

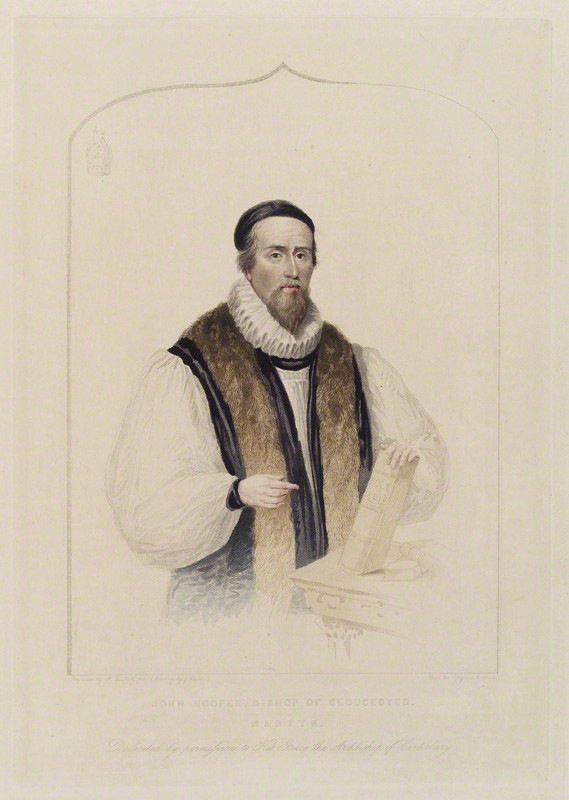
A portrait based on Hall's 1839 engraving of John Hooper, an Anglican bishop in Great Britain and proponent of the Protestant Reformation

Henry Bryan Hall (May 11, 1808 – April 25, 1884) was an English stipple engraver and portrait painter. He founded the printmaking firm of H. B. Hall and Sons in the United States.

== Early life and education ==
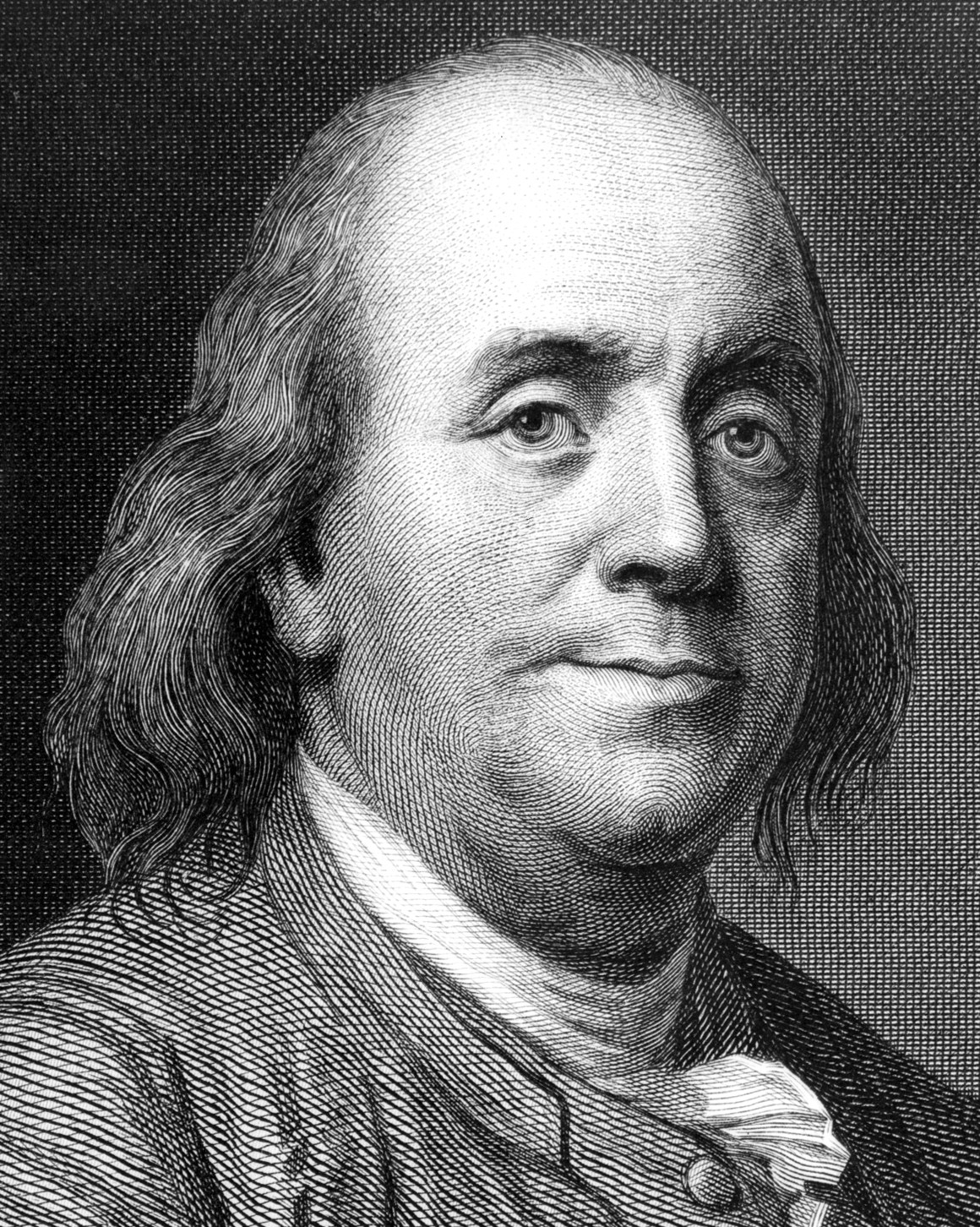
Hall's engraving of American Founding Father Benjamin Franklin

Hall was born on May 11, 1808 in London. He served apprenticeships under engravers Benjamin Smith and Henry Meyer. While still in London, he completed a portrait of Napoleon III.

== Career ==
Hall left England for the United States, and arrived in New York City in 1850, where he founded the firm of H. B. Hall and Sons. The firm flourished, engraving and publishing portraits. Hall produced images of celebrities from both the American colonial and revolutionary-era for a private club in New York City and for Philadelphia collectors. Hall's talents extended to portrait painting, including ivory miniatures.

He completed portraits of Thomas Sully and Charles Loring Elliott, and later worked for Henry Thomas Ryall, who was designated Portrait and Historical Engraver to Her Majesty, Queen Victoria.

Hall produced plates for Ryall's Eminent Conservative Statesmen (1837–1838) and assisted in the engraving of 70 portraits for Ryall's plate of The Coronation of Queen Victoria after George Hayter (1838–1842).

Hall also engraved portraits of English Protestant martyrs for C. Birch (1839) and provided plates for John Wilson and Robert Chambers's The Land of Burns (1840), Finden's Gallery of Beauty (1841), John William Carleton's Sporting Sketch-Book (1842), and John Kitto's Gallery of Scripture Engravings (1846–1849).

== Personal life ==
Hall and Mary A. Denison had eight children, including four sons and four daughters. Of the eight, Alfred, Alice, Charles, and Henry, also became accomplished engravers. Henry also fought in the American Civil War. Some engravings depicting American military and political celebrities are not definitively established as being completed by the father or son.

== Death ==
Hall died April 25, 1884, in Morrisania, New York.

== Bibliography ==
- Engen, Rodney K. Dictionary of Victorian Engravers, Print Publishers and their Works (Cambridge: Chadwyck-Healey, c1979)
- Fielding, Mantle. Dictionary of American Painters, Sculptors & Engravers, 2nd newly-rev., enl., and updated edn, ed. Glenn B. Opitz (Poughkeepsie, NY: Apollo, 1986)
- Hunnisett, Basil. A Dictionary of British Steel Engravers (Leigh-on-Sea: F. Lewis, 1980)
- Stauffer, David McNeely and Mantle Fielding. American Engravers upon Copper and Steel (New York: Franklin, 1964))
