= Walter Anderson =

Walter Anderson may refer to:

== Academics ==
- Walter Anderson (historian) (1723–1800), British historian
- Walter Anderson (folklorist) (1885–1962), German ethnologist (folklorist)
- Walter Truett Anderson (born 1933), American political scientist, futurist, and author

== Artists ==
- Walter Anderson (English artist) (1822–1903), English painter, lithographer, and engraver
- Walter Inglis Anderson (1903–1965), American painter

== Military ==
- Walter Stratton Anderson (1881–1981), Director of the United States Office of Naval Intelligence
- Walter Anderson (RAF officer, died 1936) (1890–1936), RAF officer who died while flying for British Airways Ltd
- Walter Anderson (RAF officer, died 1959) (1890–1959), RAF officer and George Cross holder

== Sports ==
- Walter Anderson (footballer) (1879–1904), English footballer
- Walter Anderson (baseball) (1897–1990), American baseball player
- Walt Anderson (American football) (born 1952), American football referee

== Other people ==
- Walter Anderson (Australian politician) (1865–1939), New South Wales politician
- Walter Anderson (1880–1963), American restaurant entrepreneur; co-founder of the White Castle restaurant chain
- Walter Anderson (trade unionist) (1910–1995), British trade union leader
- Walter Franklin Anderson (1915–2003), American pianist, organist, and composer.
- Walter Anderson (editor) (born 1944), American CEO of PARADE Magazine
- Walter Anderson (businessman) (born 1953), American telephone entrepreneur and convicted tax evader
- Walter Anderson, a fictional army officer played by Dennis Farina in the 1998 film Saving Private Ryan

== See also ==
- Walter K. Andersen, American political scientist
