= Portrait of a Young Girl =

Portrait of a Young Girl may refer to any of a large number of artworks, including:

- Portrait of a Young Girl (Christus), a painting by Petrus Christus
- Portrait of a Young Girl (Anderson), a painting by Sophie Gengembre Anderson
- Portrait of a Young Girl (Chase), a painting by William Merritt Chase
- Portrait of a Young Girl (Guérin), a painting by Pierre-Narcisse Guérin
- Portrait of a Young Girl (Henner), a painting by Jean-Jacques Henner
- Portrait of a Young Girl (Kendrick), a painting by Emma Eleonora Kendrick
