= Sophie Gengembre Anderson =

French-born British painter (1823–1903)

- Born: Sophie Gengembre; 1823; Paris, Kingdom of France
- Died: 10 March 1903 (aged 79–80); Falmouth, Cornwall, England
- Resting place: Falmouth Cemetery at Swanvale, Falmouth, England; 50°8′46.08″N 5°4′38.73″W
- Education: Charles de Steuben
- Known for: Painting
- Notable work: Elaine; and others
- Spouse: Walter Anderson

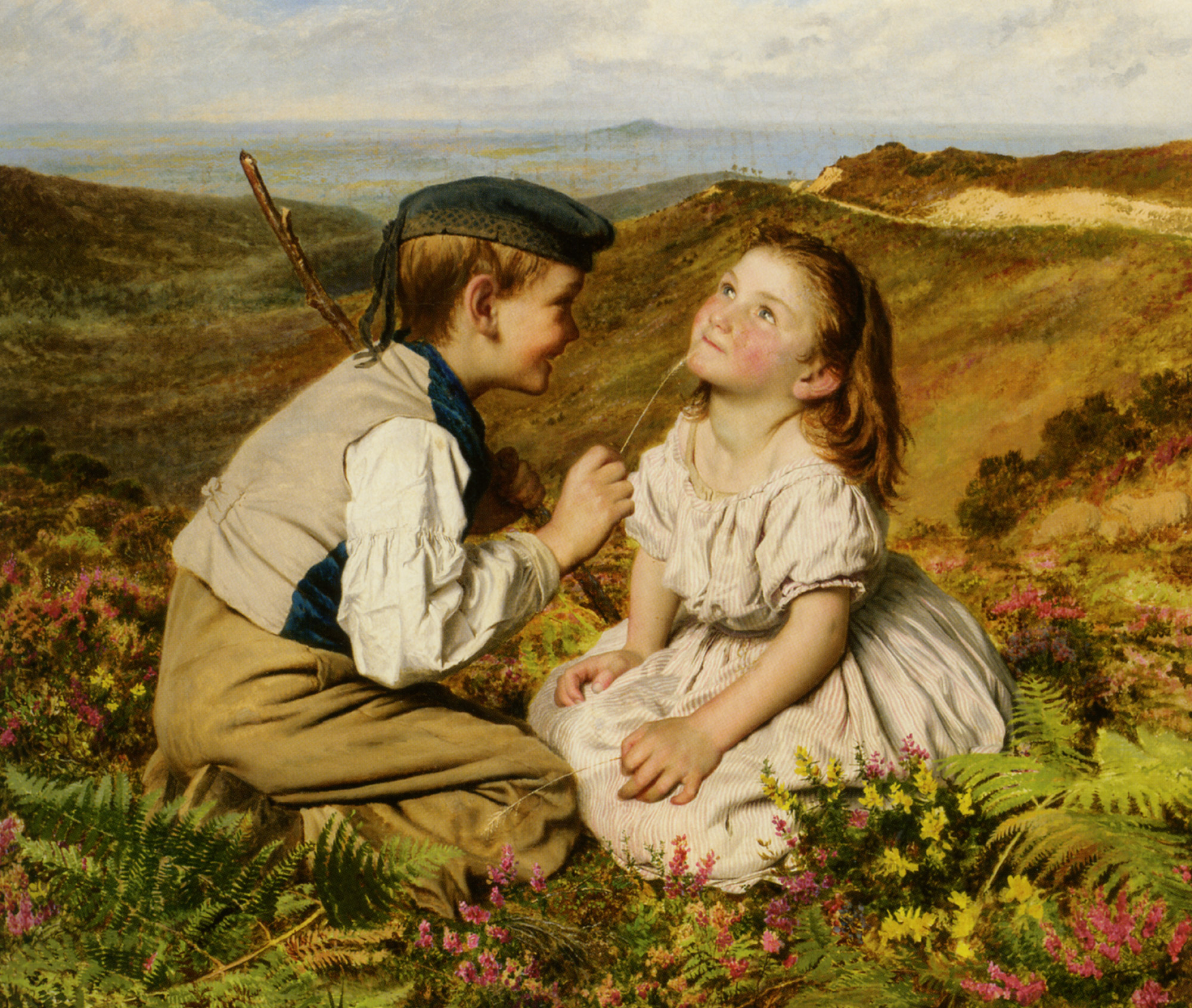
It's Touch and Go to Laugh or No (1857)

Sophie Gengembre Anderson (Note: / ... ʒɒ̃ˈʒɒ̃brə ... /, French pronunciation: [ʒɑ̃ʒɑ̃bʁ]) (1823 – 10 March 1903) was a French-born British Victorian painter who was also active in the United States for extended periods. She specialised in genre paintings of children and women, typically in rural settings. She began her career as a lithographer and portrait painter, collaborating with Walter Anderson on portraits of American Episcopal bishops. Her work, Elaine, was the first public collection purchase of a woman artist. Her painting No Walk Today was purchased for more than £1 million.

== Early life ==
Anderson was born in Paris, the daughter of Charles Antoine Colomb Gengembre, a French architect and artist, and his English wife, Marianne Farey (1799–1883), a daughter of John Farey Sr. (1766–1826) and his wife Sophia Hubert (1770–1830). They married at St Pancras Church, London, on 12 April 1818.

Her father was born in 1790 and began working as an architect at age 19. He worked primarily in municipal commissions, like the Mint of the City of Cassel, which he designed and built when he was 19. He was injured during the Revolution of 1830 on the same day that his son Philip was born. The family then went to London, where Gengembre worked as an architect for Charles Fourier. He returned to France and continued his work, designing communal schools. The family moved to the United States and adopted the surname Hubert, because of difficulties people had pronouncing their French surname. After moving to Cincinnati, Ohio, he settled in Manchester, Pennsylvania. By 1863, he had designed the Allegheny City Hall "pro bono". He stopped speaking English in protest after he was offered a share of the graft of over-inflated construction costs. The Gengembre family lived in Paris during the early years of Sophie's life, where her father was acquainted with artists, intellectuals and actors, including François Joseph Talma. Circumstances required that the family leave Paris and live in a "remote area in France" from 1829 to 1843. At age 17, she developed an interest in art when a travelling portrait painter visited her town.

She had two brothers, Philip and Henry. Philip changed his name to Philip Hubert, using his grandmother's maiden name, and was a successful architect in New York City. She was largely self-taught in art, but briefly studied portrait painting with Charles de Steuben in about 1843, when she lived with family friends in Paris. Soon after she began her studies, he left for Russia and did not return within the one year allotted for her studies. She did develop relationships with other women artists at the school where she gained a little more instruction.

== United States ==
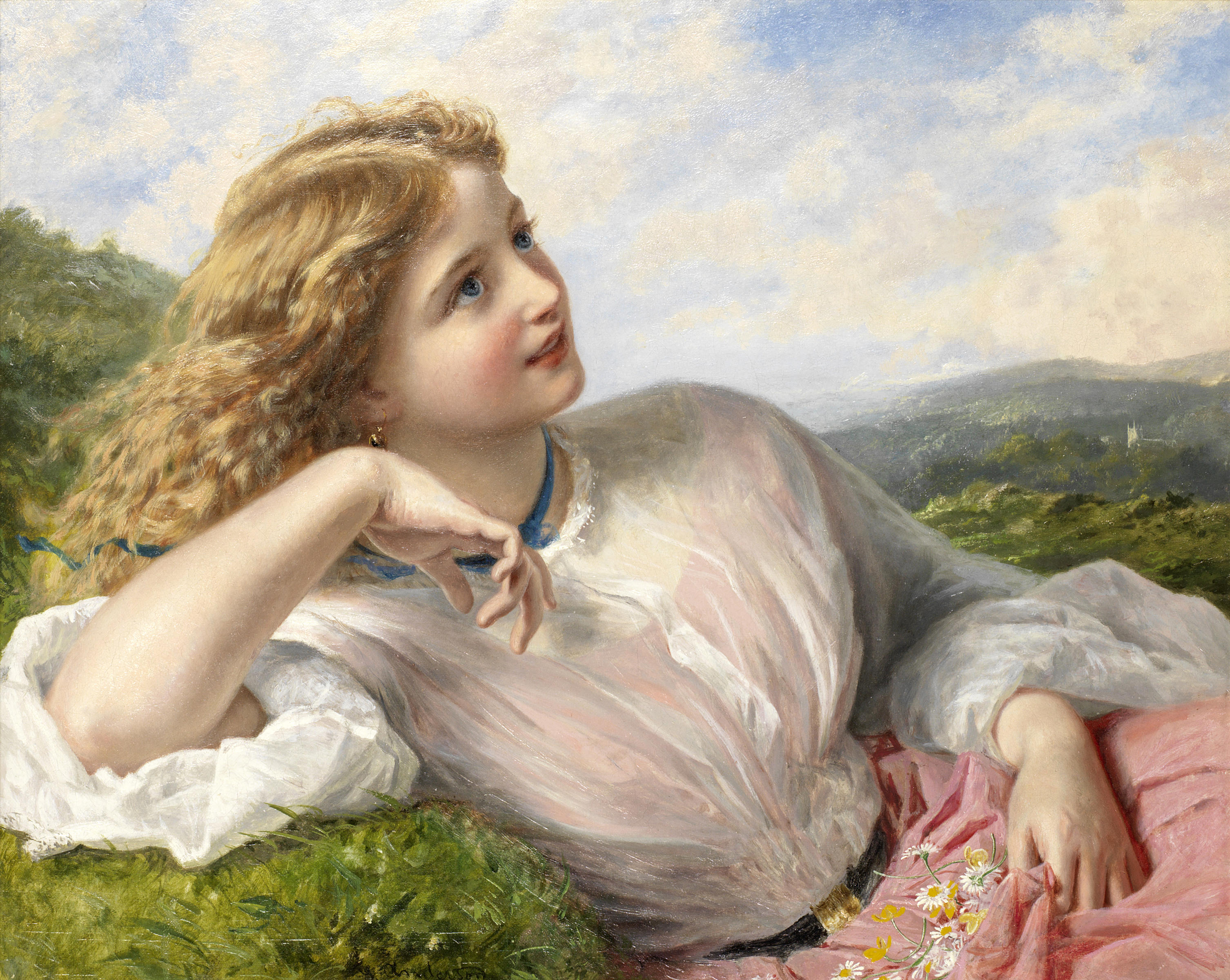
The song of the lark

The family left France for the United States to escape the 1848 revolution. They first settled in Cincinnati, Ohio, where she met her future husband, the British genre artist Walter Anderson. Her brother Henry P. Gengembre (b. 1825) was also an artist, active in Cincinnati in the early 1850s.

Her portrait, figure and Brittany landscape paintings were exhibited in October 1849 at the Western Art Union Gallery. Also exhibited was a three panel set of Victorian London scenes entitled The Ladder of Love, which was described as "the lady, in her flowery 'May of Life,' awaits in her father's garden a stolen interview with her lover; in the second, she is seen eagerly caught in his impatient arms, ere he has yet left the ladder upon which he surmounted the garden wall; in the third, having received and given reveals of unfaltering love, she walks alone again – beautiful in the enrobing light of a summer moon, happy in the assurance that the warmth and devotedness of her affection is reciprocated."

In 1851 four or more of her illustrations were included in the Historical Collections of the Great West by Henry Howe. She collaborated with Walter Anderson, her future husband, on portraits of Protestant Episcopal bishops and created other portraits in her business.

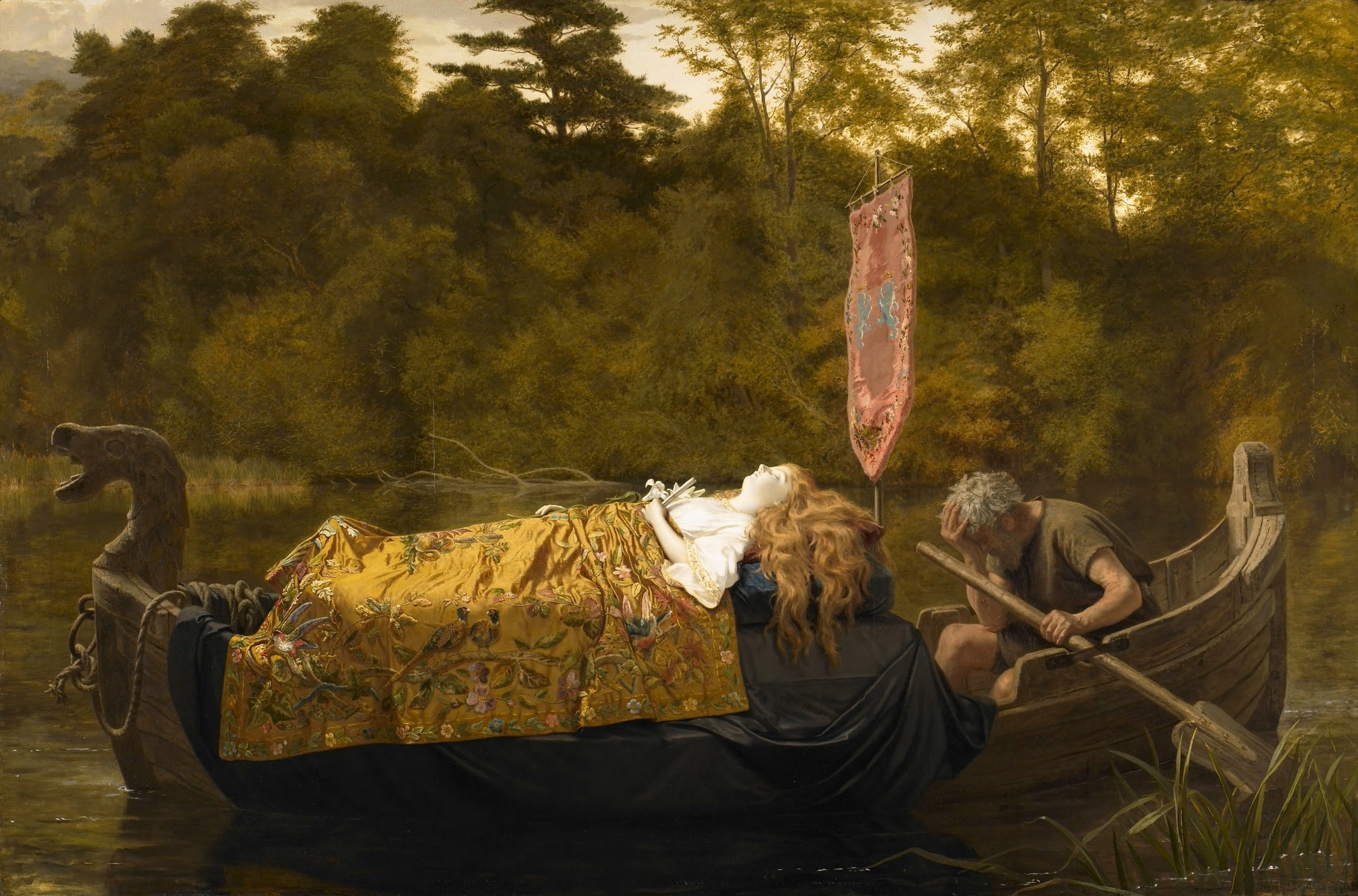
Elaine (1870)

She then lived in Manchester, Pennsylvania, with her parents, where she is believed to have married Walter Anderson. She worked there for the chromolithographers Louis Prang & Company.

== Europe ==
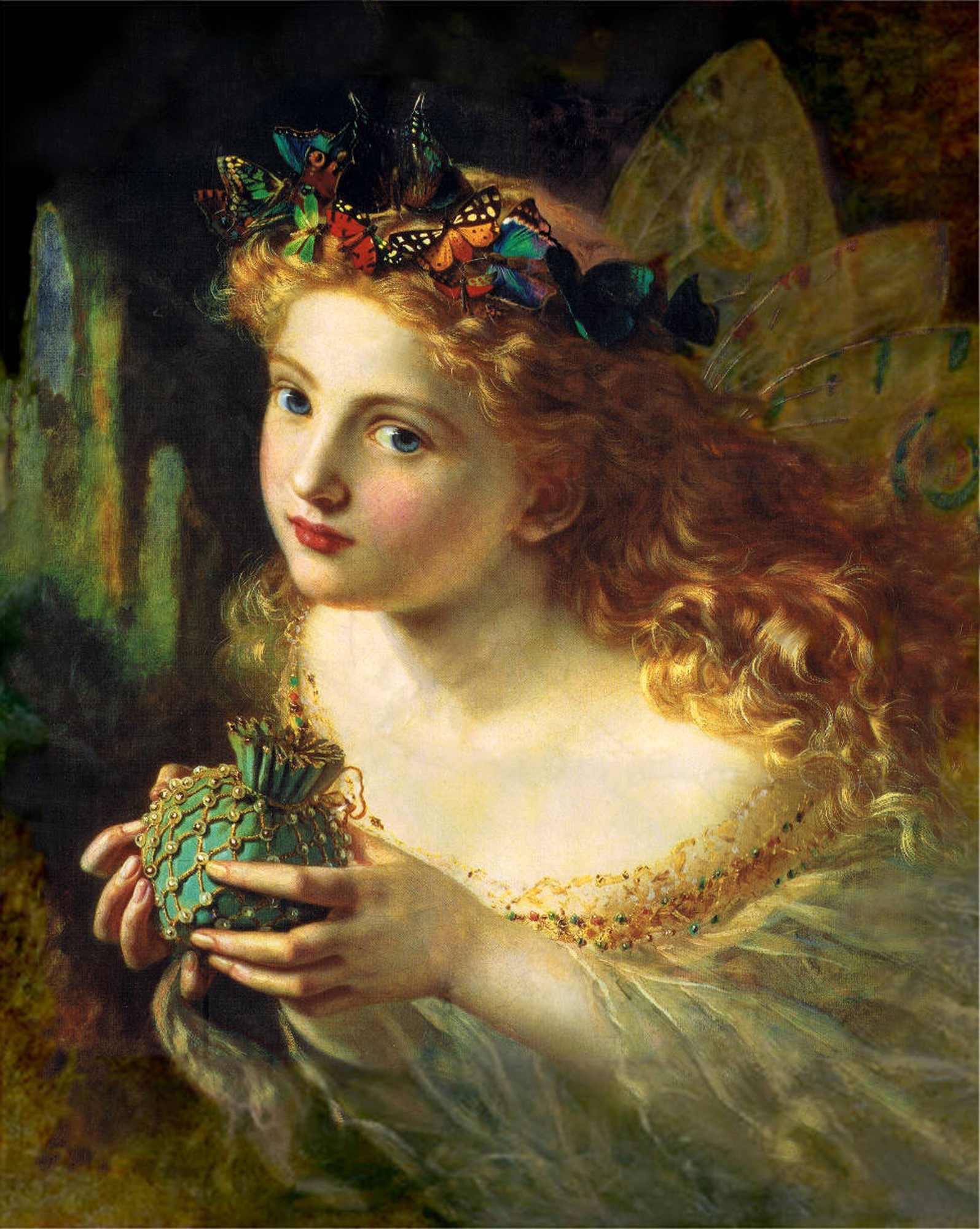
A portrait of a fairy (1869). The title of the painting is Take the Fair Face of Woman, and Gently Suspending, With Butterflies, Flowers, and Jewels Attending, Thus Your Fairy is Made of Most Beautiful Things – from a verse by Charles Ede.

In 1854, the Andersons moved to London, where Sophie exhibited a still life of fruit, vegetables, game, and fish entitled An American Market Basket at the Society of British Artists by 1855. It was considered an "admirable composition" made with "surprising truth". Her genre pieces were also exhibited at the Royal Academy. They returned to Pennsylvania in 1858 for a long visit with her family, during which time she exhibited at the Pittsburgh Artist's Association in 1859 and 1860. The latter year she and her husband had work shown at the National Academy of Design. She then settled in London again around 1863.

Anderson's work was widely exhibited at venues including the Royal Academy, the Royal Society of British Artists (RBA), and the British Institution. Her work, Elaine, was one of the first public collection purchases of a living woman artist. The Marquis de Murrieta contributed the painting A Fairy Messenger to a mixed charity exhibition in 1871.

Her oil painting Foundling Girls at Prayer in the Chapel (mid-c19th – late-c19th) is displayed at the Foundling Museum; correlating well with Anderson's typical genre painting of children and women and the museum's focus. The painting depicts the varying ages of the foundling girls, what they wore, and references the religious aspects of their life.

To manage her health issues, the couple moved to the Isle of Capri in 1871, where they lived, painted, and entertained society in a house with a large garden called Villa Castello. Capri was then an artists colony. Its residents included Frederic Leighton, Walter McLaren, John Singer Sargent, Edouard Alexandre Sain, and Jean Benner. She exhibited at the Grosvenor Gallery between 1878 and 1887. Anderson made Italian genre and Neoclassical paintings, including paintings of peasant women and children. At a time when it was difficult for women to have a successful artistic career, these paintings, generally made by men, allowed for her to have a successful career.

== Later years and death ==
The couple moved to England in 1894 and lived and painted in Wood Lane Cottage in Falmouth, Cornwall. She continued to exhibit her work in London. On 11 January 1903 her husband Walter died and two months later, on 10 March 1903, she died at home in Falmouth. She was buried at Swanvale cemetery in Falmouth in the same grave as her husband.

== Legacy ==
A world record price for her work of more than £1 million was achieved by No Walk Today at Sotheby's, London, in November 2008. It made her "Cornwall's first million-pound female artist."

Anderson's work is in the collection of numerous museums and galleries, mainly in the United Kingdom, including Leicester Museum & Art Gallery; Russell-Cotes Art Gallery & Museum, Bournemouth; Royal Botanic Gardens, Kew; Walker Art Gallery, Liverpool; Birmingham City Art Gallery; Museum and Art Gallery, Walsall, Staffordshire; and the Wolverhampton Art Gallery, Staffordshire.

== Gallery ==
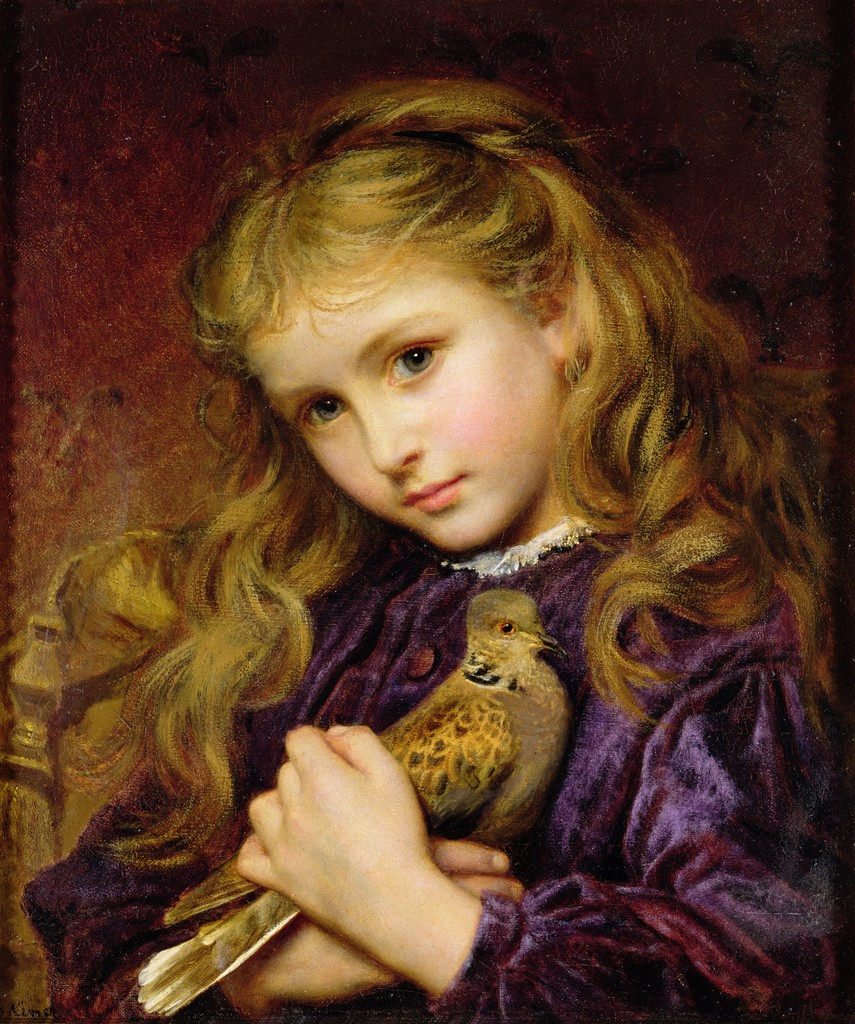
The Turtle Dove

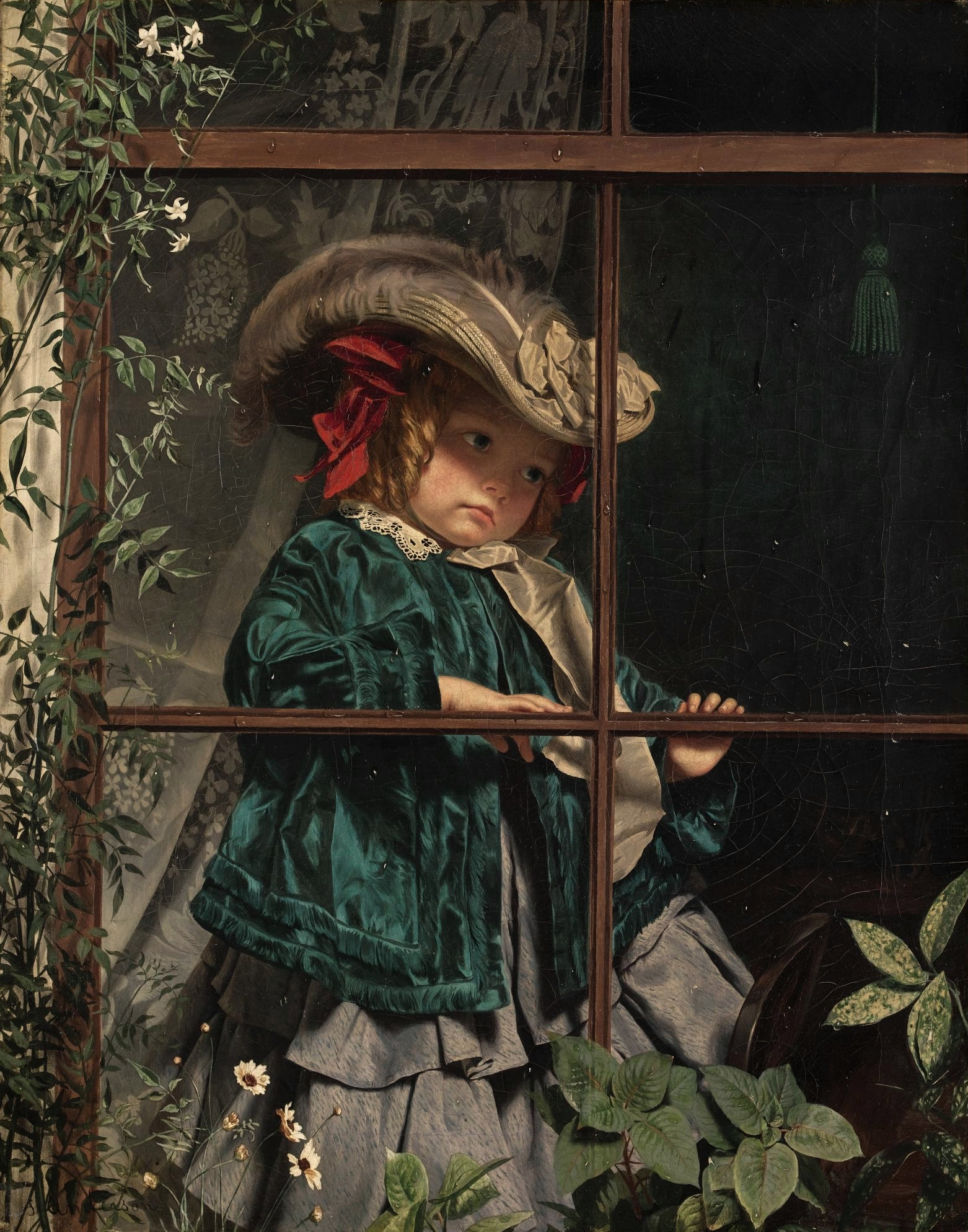
No Walk Today

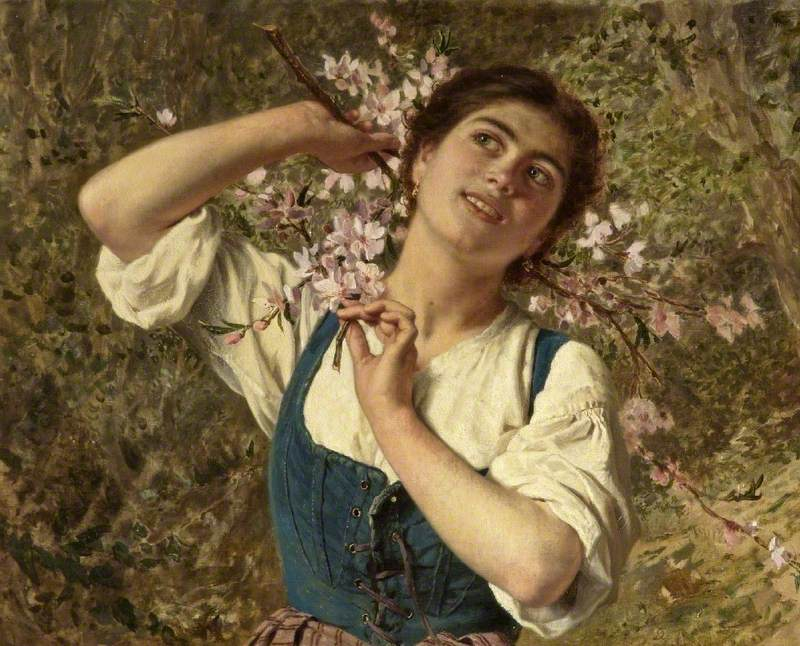
Capri Girl with Flowers

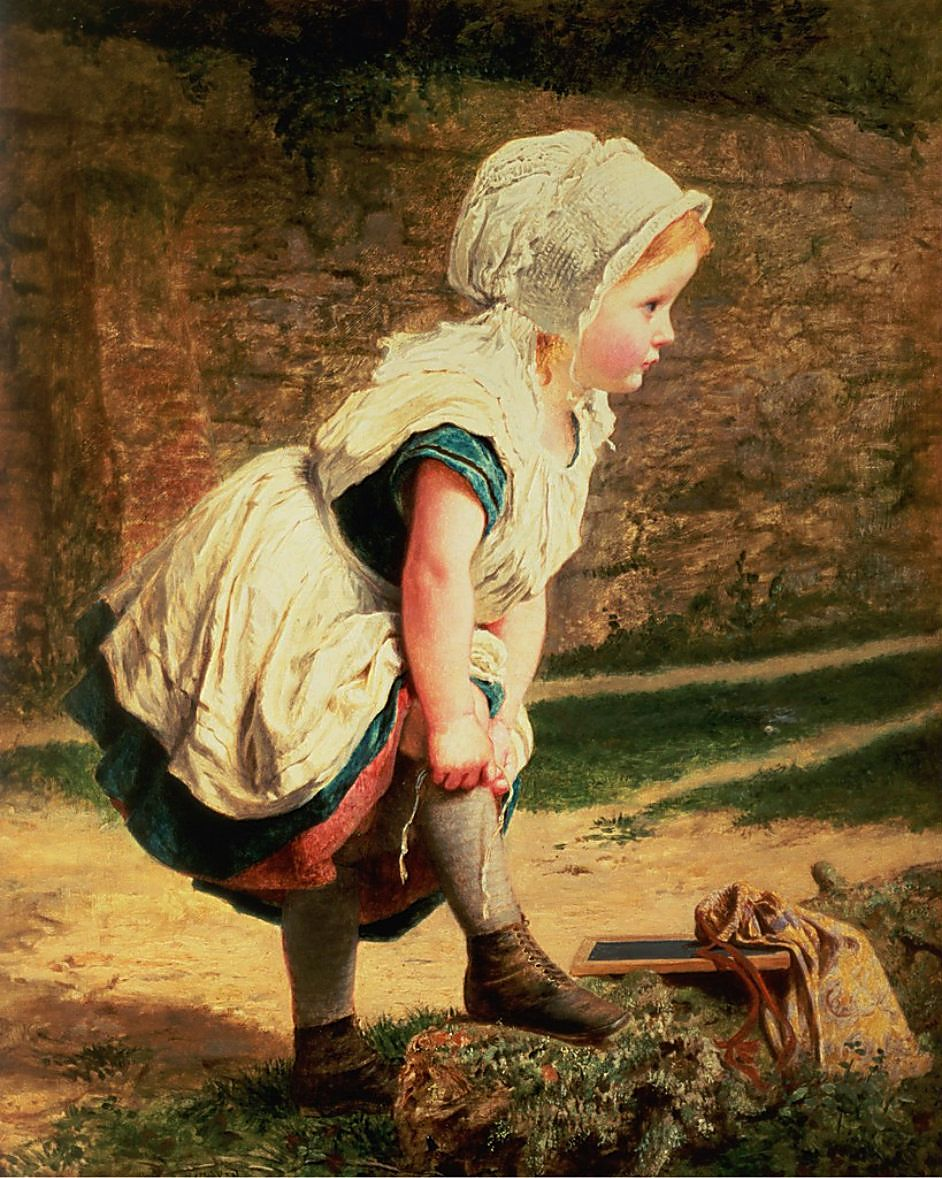
Wait for Me

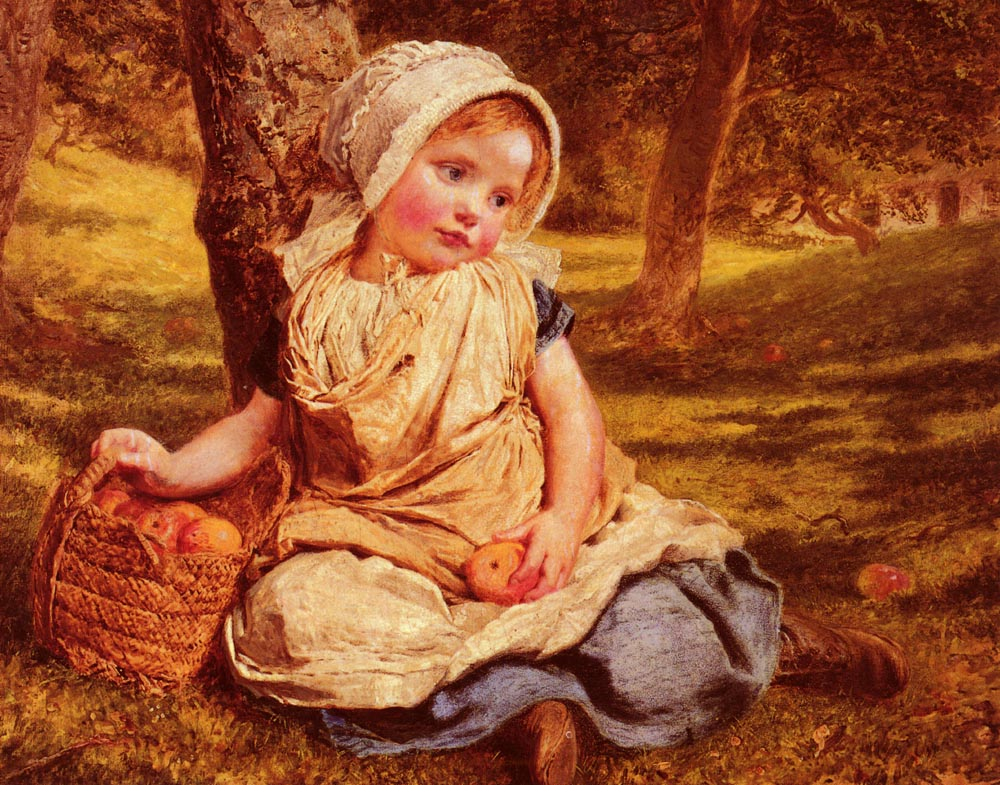
Windfalls

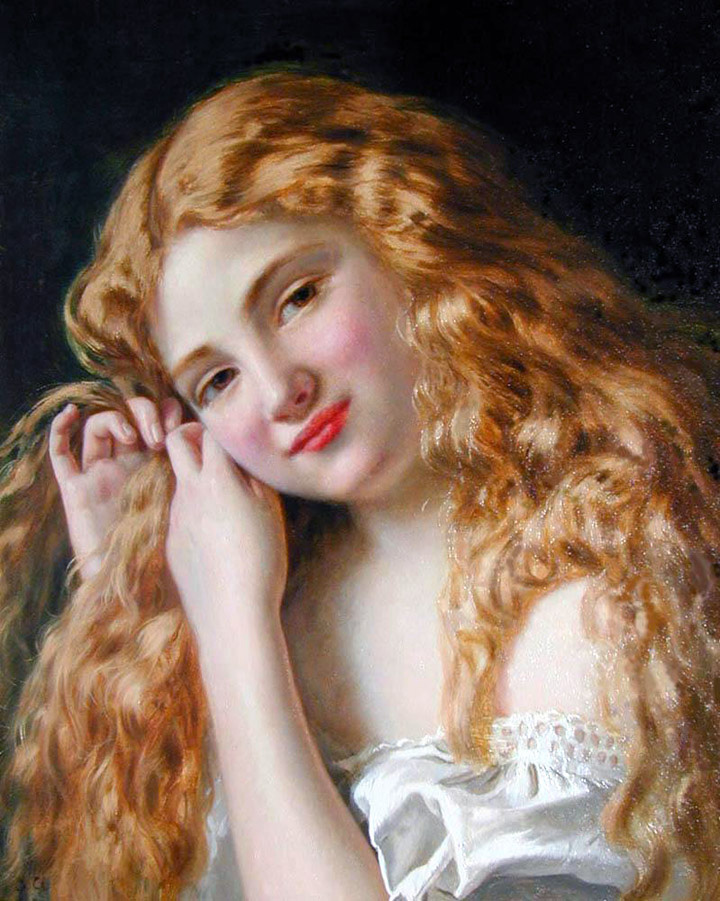
Young Girl Fixing Her Hair

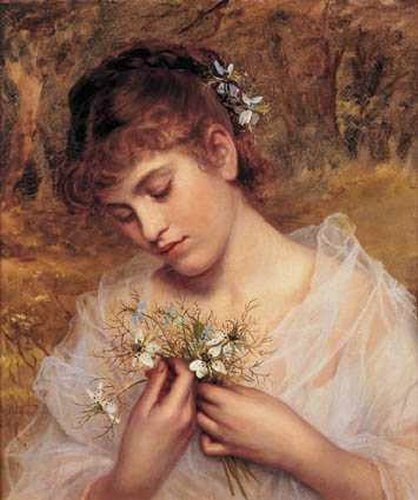
Love in a Mist

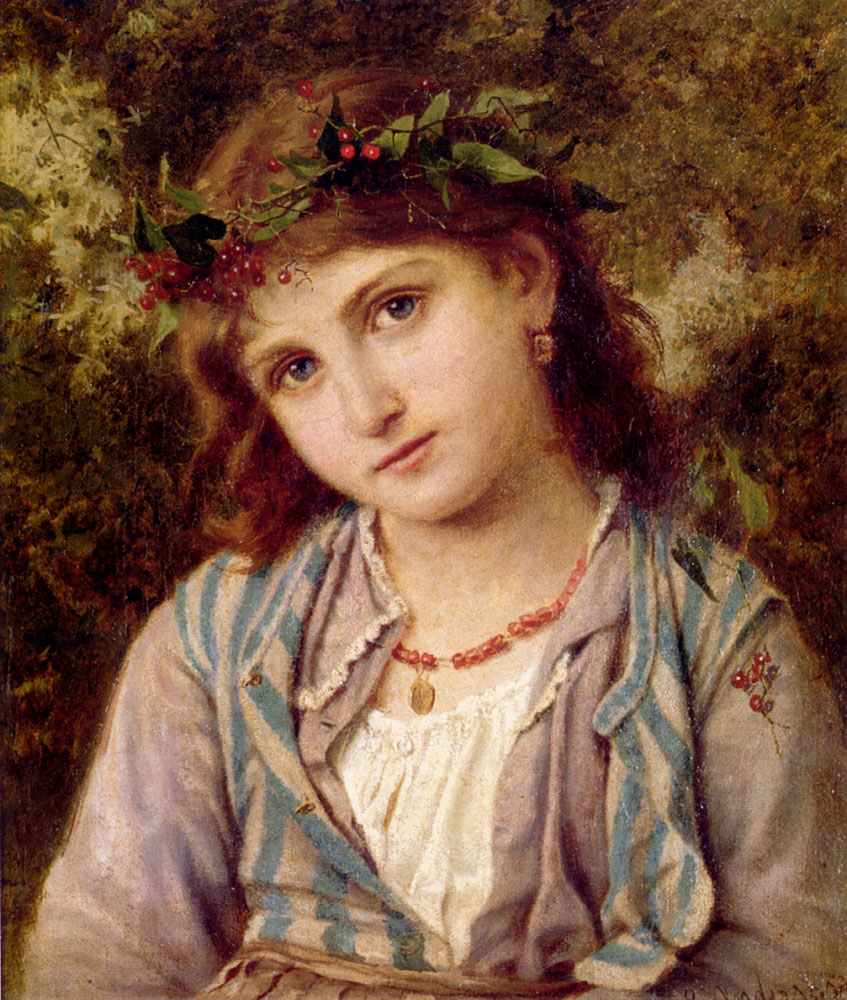
An Autumn Princess

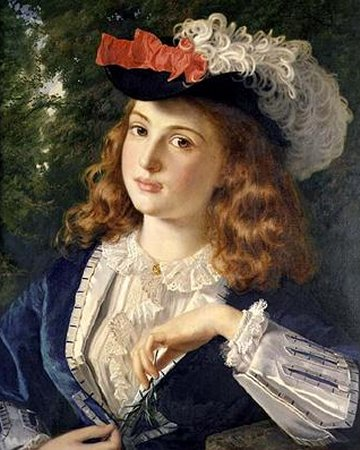
A Spring Beauty

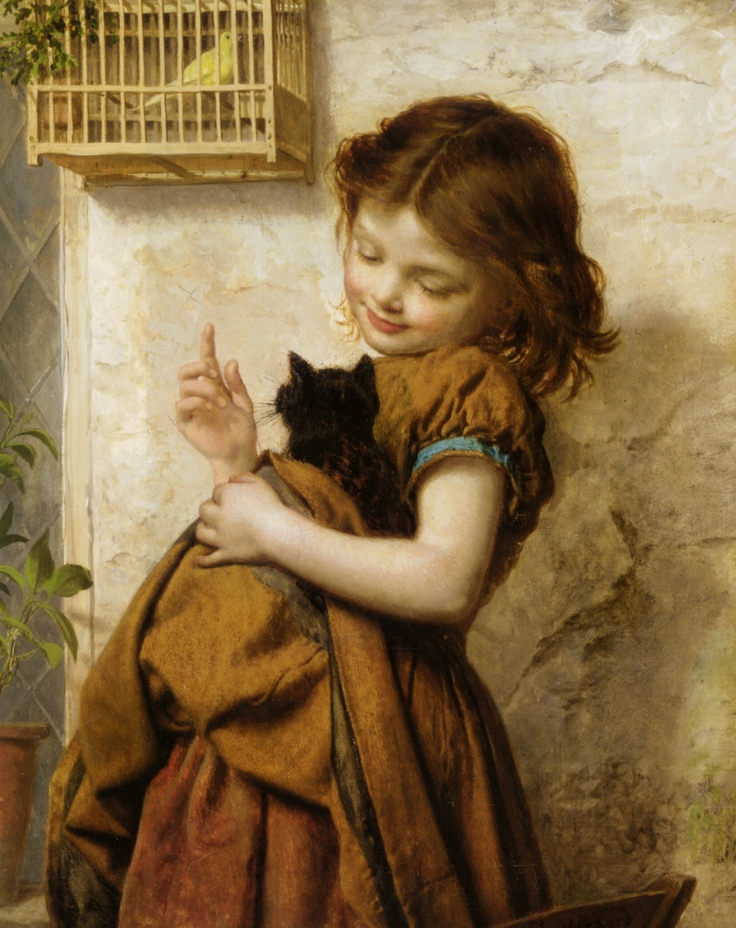
Her Favorite Pets

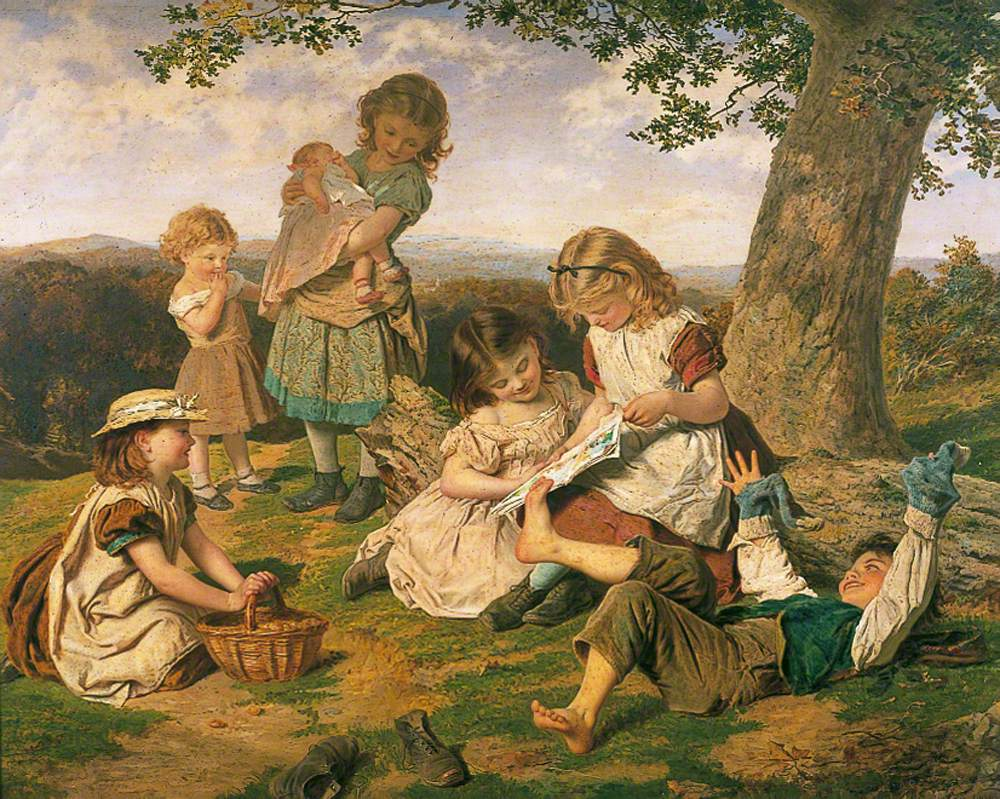
The Children's Story Book

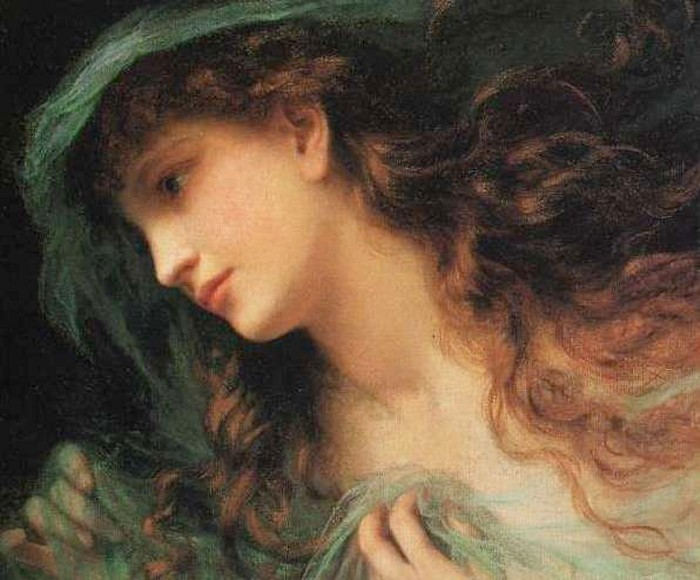
The Head of a Nymph

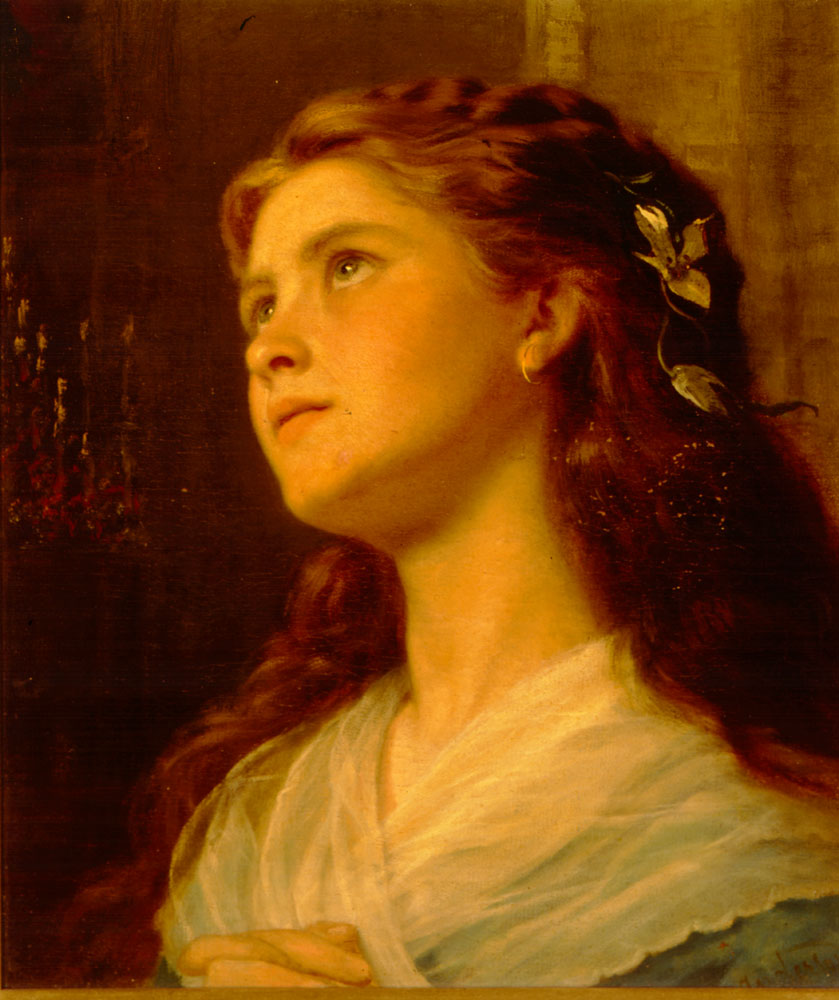
Portrait of a Young Girl

== See also ==
- List of works by Sophie Gengembre Anderson
