= Walter Anderson (English artist) =

English painter

- Born: Walter John Stodart Anderson; 1822; Peckham, London, England
- Died: 11 January 1903; Falmouth, Cornwall, England
- Resting place: Falmouth Cemetery at Swanvale, Falmouth, England; 50°8′46.08″N 5°4′38.73″W
- Known for: Painting, lithography, engraving
- Spouse: Sophie Gengembre Anderson

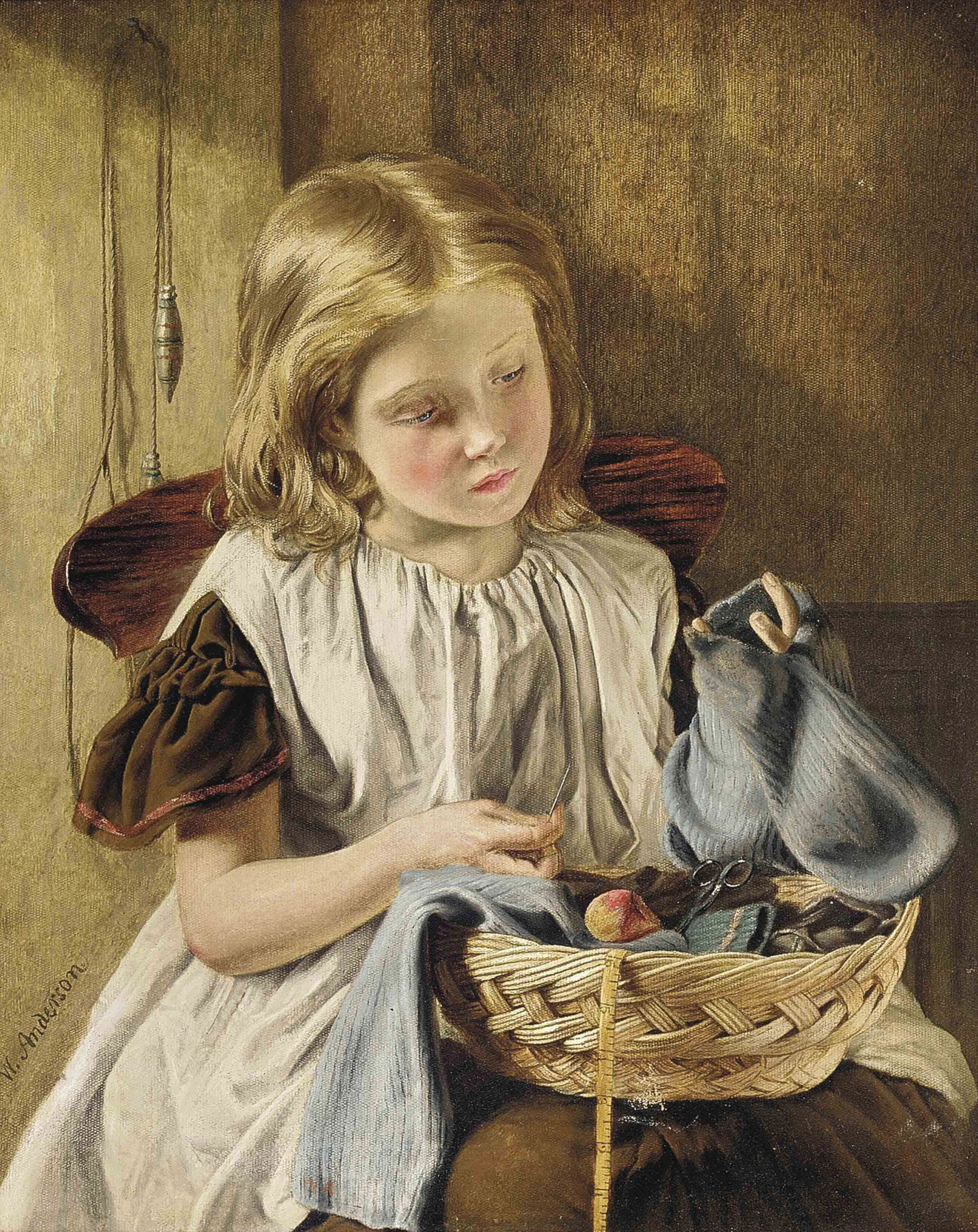
Walter Anderson, A Stitch in Time, oil on canvas, by 1890

Walter John Stodart Anderson (baptised 9 October 1822 – 11 January 1903) was an English painter, lithographer, and engraver. He painted still lifes, landscapes and genre work.

== United States ==
Anderson lived in Cincinnati, Ohio from 1849 to 1853, when he was an active lithographer and engraver. He worked first for Charles A. Jewett, a lithographer in the city. He collaborated with Sophie Gengembre, his future wife, and Thomas Faris. They worked together by 1851 when the first two lithographers of Protestant Episcopal bishops were produced.

He created illustrations for Biographical and Historical Memoirs of the Early Pioneer Settlers of Ohio written by Samuel P. Hildreth, as did his future brother-in-law Henry P. Gengembre. The book was published in 1852.

In 1853 the Gengembre family moved to Manchester, Pennsylvania and Anderson followed and married Sophie Gengembre.

== Europe ==
Anderson and his wife moved to England by 1854. He began exhibiting his works there in 1856. They lived in Pennsylvania, near Pittsburgh, in 1859. By 1863 they had returned to London. He exhibited his works at the Royal Society of British Artists and the Royal Academy of Arts.

They moved to the Isle of Capri in 1871. They moved to England in the early 1890s and lived in Falmouth.

He died on 11 January 1903 in Falmouth. (Note: Haverstock states on page 18 that Walter died in 1898. On page 329, Walter died in 1903, the same year as his wife Sophie. Cornwall Artists states that he died on 11 January 1903.)
