= List of works by Sophie Gengembre Anderson =

The following is a list of works by Sophie Gengembre Anderson (1823–1903).

Image	Title	Year	Description
	A Flower Seller in Capri, Italy	c.1875	private collection. Listed at Bridgeman Art Library
	After the Earthquake	1884	oil on canvas. Auckland Art Gallery Toi o Tāmaki
	A Neapolitan Child		oil on canvas, Leicester Museum & Art Gallery
	A New Friend		private collection. Listed at Bridgeman Art Library.
	A Spring Beauty		private collection. Listed at Bridgeman Art Library.
	An Autumn Princess		oil on canvas, public collection.
	An Opportune Moment		private collection. Listed at Bridgeman Art Library.
	Autumn		oil on canvas, public collection.
	Awake		private collection. Listed at Bridgeman Art Library.
	Birdsong		oil on canvas, private collection.
	Capri Girl with Flowers		oil on canvas, Russell-Cotes Art Gallery & Museum
	Christmas Time - "Here's The Gobbler!"	c. 1877	private collection. Listed at Bridgeman Art Library.
	Dinner		private collection. Listed at Bridgeman Art Library.
	Dreaming Daisy		
	Elaine or The Lily Maid of Astolat	1870	Walker Art Gallery, Liverpool.
	Fair Face Fairy		
	Far away		private collection.
	Far-Away Thoughts		private collection. Listed at Bridgeman Art Library.
	Foundling Girls at Prayer in the Chapel	c. 1877	Foundling Museum, London. Listed at Bridgeman Art Library.
	Gathering Beechnuts		
	Girl with Lilacs	1865	oil on canvas, public collection.
	Girl with Lilacs?	?	Oil on Canvas. Private Collection (posted here by owner)
	Guess Again		
	Head of a Nymph		Roy Miles Fine Paintings. Listed at Bridgeman Art Library.
	Heavenwards	1883	oil on canvas, private collection.
	Her Favorite Pets		oil on canvas, private collection.
	It's My Turn to Play Mother!		Forbes Magazine Collection. Listed at Bridgeman Art Library.
	It's Touch and Go to Laugh or No	1857	oil of canvas, private collection.
	Little Lord Fauntleroy Under House Arrest,	1856	oil on canvas
	Love in a Mist		private collection. Listed at Bridgeman Art Library.
	Neapolitan Child		
	No Walk Today		oil on canvas, private collection. Listed at Bridgeman Art Library.
	Peek-a-Boo		private collection. Listed at Bridgeman Art Library.
	Pet Canary		oil on canvas, The New Art Gallery Walsall
	Picking Honeysuckle		
	Portrait of a Young Girl		
	Prattling Primrose		
	Ready For The Ball		oil on canvas, private collection.
	Reverie		watercolour.
	Scheherazade		oil on canvas, The New Art Gallery Walsall
	Shepherd Piper	1881	private collection. Listed at Bridgeman Art Library.
	Sing for Your Supper		private collection. Listed at Bridgeman Art Library.
	Spring Blossom		Oakham Galleries, London.
	Studies of Hawthorne Bush, Capri		oil on canvas.
	Sweet Dreams		
	Take the Fair Face of Woman or The Fairy Queen		oil on canvas, private collection. Listed at Bridgeman Art Library.
	The Birds Nest		oil on canvas, private collection.
	The Bonfire		oil on canvas, private collection.
	The Children's Story Book		oil on canvas, Birmingham Museum & Art Gallery.
	The Last of the Day		
	The Last Tribute of Love		
	The Pearl Earring		
	The Song	1881	oil on canvas, Wolverhampton Arts and Heritage
	The song of the lark		oil on canvas, private collection.
	The Song of the Nightingale		oil on canvas.
	The Studio		Roy Miles Fine Paintings. Listed at Bridgeman Art Library.
	The Thrush's Nest		oil on canvas.
	The Time of the Lilacs		oil on canvas, private collection.
	The Turtle Dove		private collection. Listed at Bridgeman Art Library.
	Wait for Me! or Returning Home from School		private collection. Listed at Bridgeman Art Library.
	When the Heart Is Young		oil on canvas, public collection.
	Windfalls		oil on canvas, private collection. Listed at Bridgeman Art Library.
	Young girl		oil on canvas, private collection.
	Young Girl Fixing Her Hair		
	Young Girl with a Garland of Marguerites		private collection. Listed at Bridgeman Art Library.
	The flower girl, Capri		Private collection
