= Walter Anderson (historian) =

Walter Anderson (1723–1800), was a historian.

Anderson was for fifty years minister of Chirnside, Berwickshire. He was the author of a rare (anonymous) book (said to have been suggested in jest by Hume), The History of Crœsus, King of Lydia, in four parts, containing observations (1) on the Ancient Notions of Destiny; (2) on Dreams; (3) on the Origin and Credit of Oracles; (4) and the Principles on which their Responses were defended against any attack, 12mo, 1755. It is chiefly a translation from Herodotus, with a serious discussion of the inspiration of oracles. It was ridiculed in the first Edinburgh Review, and in Smollett's The Critical Review. In 1769 he published a history of France under Francis II and Charles IX; in 1775 a continuation to the Edict of Nantes, and in 1783 another to the Peace of Munster. Each book, it is said, was paid for by the sale of a house. In 1791 he published a volume on the Philosophy of Ancient Greece.

He died on 31 August 1800 at Chirnside.
