= English Female Artists =

1876 two-volume work listing an overview of English women artists

English female artists, in two volumes
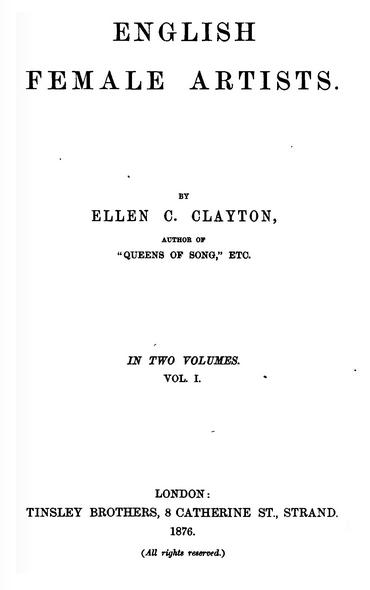
- Author: Ellen Creathorne Clayton
- Language: English language
- Genre: Art history
- Publisher: Tinsley Brothers
- Publication date: 1876
- Publication place: United Kingdom
- Pages: 369 & 331
- OCLC: 608634722

English Female Artists, in two volumes, assembled and edited by Ellen Creathorne Clayton, lists an overview of prominent English women painters up to 1876, the year of publication.

The purpose of the book was to provide "a roll call of honourable names". The book is considered a useful reference work for anyone studying British women's art.

== Brief overview ==
English Female Artists was published by the now extinct printing firm of the Tinsley Brothers. An untitled review by Pamela Gerrish Nun described English Female artists as “not the work of an art historian nor of a feminist, and is ultimately an unsatisfying and unsatisfactory work” in reference to the story-like style within the volumes. However, María Begoña Lasa Álvarez stated that the work is a celebration of the women mentioned and all their lifelong work, the biographical and social descriptions of them within the novel, is to illustrate all the hardships that these women overcame as an artist in a male dominated era. The book has overall sentiments of the fight for women's rights and recognition. As well as a critique for her home country of Ireland, as she emphasises the way English society regards its women artists in a higher light versus how Irish society regards women artists. This critique shows Ms. Clayton’s steps for early feminism. It is noted that Clayton refers to some of the women highlighted as “sisters'' showing a deeper connection between the author and her muses and can be inferred that they are a sisterhood fighting for women's rights. Overall, English Female Artists is not only an ode to women artists but an early feminist novel as well.

== About the author ==
Ellen Creathorne Clayton was a woman author who lived from 1834 to 1900. She was born in Dublin, Ireland and came from a family of engravers and artists. Clayton was artistic herself and had a talent for writing, publishing articles at the age of just fourteen. She went on to write seven books, English Female Artists being her most notable publication. Clayton moved to London with her family and father Benjamin Clayton III, aged seven, and continued to publish under her maiden name even after her marriage to James Henry Needham. Clayton died in London on 19 July 1900.

== Volume I (historical female artists) ==
- Susannah Hornebolt and Levina Teerlinc
- Anne Carlisle, Artemisia Gentileschi, The Sisters Cleyn
- Anna Maria Carew, Elizabeth Neale, Mary More, Mrs. Boardman, Elizabeth Creed
- Mary Beale, Susan Penelope Rosse, Anne Killigrew, Maria Verelst, Anne, Princess of Orange, Princess Caroline, Agatha van der Mijn, Sarah Hoadly, Elizabeth Blackwell, Mary Delany, Frances Reynolds, Angelica Kauffman, Mary Moser, Maria Cosway, Mary Harrison, Anna Maria Charretie, Adelaide Agnes Maguire

== Volume II (contemporary artists) ==
The second volume is a list of biographies of women active in the 19th century, most of whom were contemporaries whose works were known to the author. It is grouped by painting genre and includes an appendix of amateurs and women who were "Honorary Members" of the "Society of Lady Artists". The second volume also includes the index for both volumes.

== Figure painters ==
Helen Allingham, Laura Alma-Tadema, Sophie Anderson, Edith Courtauld-Arendrup, Margaret Backhouse, Julia Behr, Kate Bisschop-Swift, Agnes Rose Bouvier Nicholl, Alice Boyd, Adelaide Claxton, Rebecca Coleman, Fanny Corbaux, Mary Ann Criddle, Mary Ellen Edwards, Eliza Bridell Fox, Margaret Gillies, Nellie Gosse, Catherine Hueffer (sister of Mrs. WM Rossetti), Elizabeth Jerichau, Louise Jopling, Helen Jane Arundel Miles, Elizabeth Murray, Hollyn Peterson, Lucy Madox Brown (Mrs. WM Rossetti), Sarah Setchel, Rebecca Solomon, Catherine Adeline Sparks, Louisa Starr, Marie Spartali-Stillman, Ellen Stone, Elizabeth Thompson, Mary S. Tovey, Eliza Turck, Augusta Walker, Henrietta, and her daughters Eva and Flora

== Landscape painters ==
Barbara Bodichon, Eleanor Brown, Marian Emma Chase, Marian Croft, Susan Elizabeth Gay, Mary Gow, Alice Elfrida Manly, Madeline Marrable, Anna Blunden Martino, Clara Montalba, Emma Sophia Oliver, Elizabeth Phillips, Louise, Rose, and Margaret Rayner, Frances Redgrave, Harriette Anne Seymour, Norah and Ellen Vernon, Hilda Annetta Walker, Sophie S. Warren, Linnie Watt

== Portrait and miniature painters, painters on enamel, etc. ==
Maria Burt, Grace Cruickshank, Annie Dixon, Charlotte Grace Dixon, Ellen Hill, Ellen Montalba, Margaret Tekusch, Margaret Thomas

== Painters of flowers, fruit, and still life ==
Helen Cordelia Angell, Emma Wren Cooper, May Corkling, Mary Ann Duffield, Anna Maria Fitz James, Anna Maria Guerin, Maria Harrison, Teresa Hegg de Lauderset, Florence Lewis, Agnes MacWhirter, Martha Darley Mutrie and Annie Feray Mutrie, Joanna Samworth, Susanna Soden, Eloise Harriet Stannard, Mary and Florence Vernon, Emma Walter

== Animal painters ==
Hannah Bolton Barlow, Emily Desvignes, Frances C. Fairman, Katharine King, Mary Louisa Kirschner, Gertrude Jekyll, Frances Fripp Rossiter, Hilda Annetta Walker.

== Humorous designers ==
Georgina Bowers, Ellen Creathorne Clayton, Adelaide Claxton, Marie Duval

== Decorative artists ==
Elizabeth Campbell Collingridge, Emily Edwards (sister of Mrs. Sparkes), Louisa, Marchioness of Waterford, Priscilla Anne, Countess of Westmorland, Marion Margaret, Viscountess Alford, Lady Anne Loftus, Eleanor Vere Boyle, Lady Duckett, Lady Dunbar, Mrs. Hugh Blackburn, Mrs. Higford Burr, Mrs. Patty Harding, Mrs. Hussey, Mrs. Frank Johnstone Mitchell, Mrs. Pfeiffer, Mrs. Harriet Olivia Boddington
