= Benjamin Clayton =

Benjamin Clayton may refer to:

- Benjamin Clayton I (c. 1754–1814), Irish wood engraver
- Benjamin Clayton II (1786–1862), his son, Irish wood engraver
- Benjamin Clayton III (1809–1883), his son, Irish wood engraver and miniature painter
