= William Stephen Coleman =

English painter and book illustrator

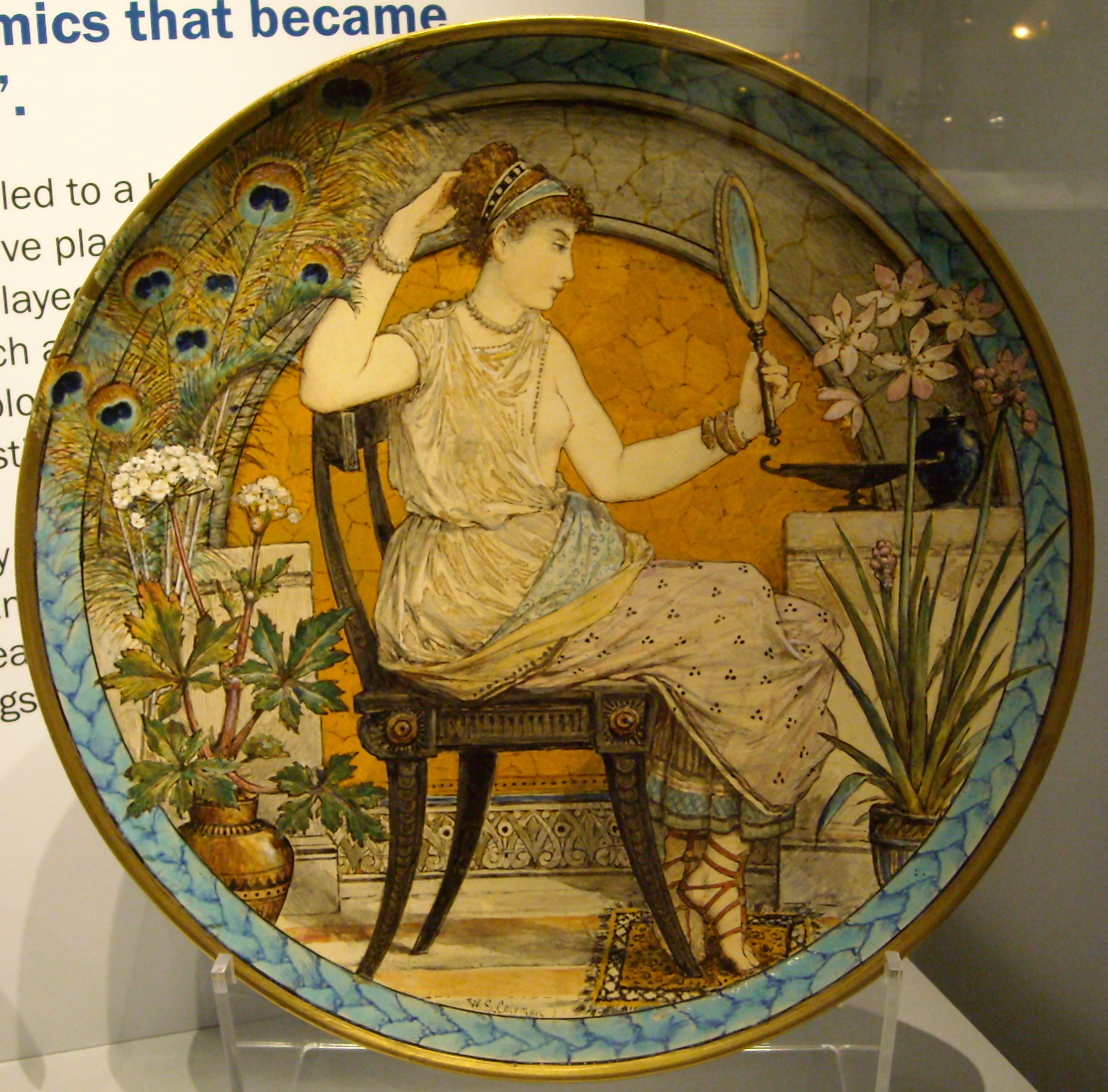
Plate for Mintons, 1869

William Stephen Coleman (1829–1904) was an English painter and book illustrator.

== Life ==
Born at Horsham, Sussex, he was one of the 12 children of the surgeon William Thomas Coleman and his wife Henrietta Dendy; the artist Helen Cordelia Coleman (1847–1884) was the fifth daughter of the family.

Coleman was unsuccessful in a career as surgeon, and turned to natural history illustration. He collaborated with Harrison Weir, Joseph Wolf and others; in the preparation of the wood-blocks he was assisted by his sister Rebecca. He painted in watercolour, mainly landscapes with figures, in a style with something in common with Birket Foster, and semi-classical figure subjects, related to those by Albert Joseph Moore. His classically-influenced works placed him in the "toga and terrace" or "marble school" with George Bulleid, W. Anstey Dollond, Norman Prescott-Davies and Oliver Rhys.

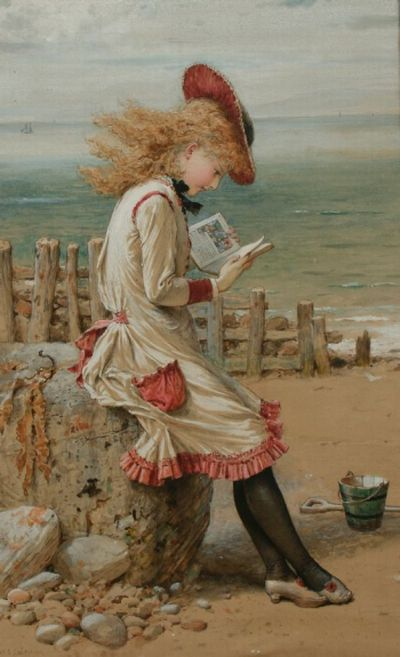
An Interesting Story by William Stephen Coleman

Coleman also executed etchings, occasionally worked in pastel, and painted in oil. He was a member of the original committee of management of the Dudley Gallery, contributing to the first exhibition in 1865. He continued to exhibit till 1879, and remained on the committee till 1881.

In 1869 Coleman began to experiment in pottery decoration; the Mintons Art Pottery Studio in Kensington Gore was established under his direction in 1871, and he executed figure designs for Mintons ceramic ware. He died after a long illness at 11 Hamilton Gardens, St. John's Wood, on 22 March 1904. His widow survived him.

== Works ==
In 1859 Coleman published Our Woodlands. Heaths, and Hedges, and in 1860 British Butterflies, both books running to several editions. Books that he illustrated included:

- Common Objects of the Country (1858)
- Our Garden Friends (1864), and Common Moths (1870), by John George Wood
- Playhours and Half-holidays (1860), Sketches in Natural History (1861), and British Birds' Eggs and Nests (1861), by John Christopher Atkinson
- British Ferns (1861), by Thomas Moore
- A Treasury of New Favourite Tales (1861) by Mary Howitt
- Philip and his Garden (1861) by Charlotte Elizabeth Tonna
- Hymns in Prose for Children (1864) by Anna Letitia Barbauld
- The Illustrated London Almanack and Cassell's Natural History.

== Notes ==
Attribution

This article incorporates text from a publication now in the public domain: Stephen, Leslie, ed. (1885). "Coleman, William Stephen". Dictionary of National Biography. Vol. 1. London: Smith, Elder & Co.
