= Samuel Clayton =

Irish artist

- Born: circa 1783; Dublin, Ireland
- Died: 26 June 1853 (aged 69–70); Australia
- Family: Benjamin Clayton I (father); Benjamin Clayton II (brother); Robert Clayton (brother); Benjamin Clayton III (nephew)

Samuel Clayton (circa 1783 - 26 June 1853) was an Irish wood engraver, miniature painter, silversmith, and portrait painter.

== Life in Dublin ==
Samuel Clayton was born in Dublin around 1783. His father was wood engraver, Benjamin Clayton I. He had two younger brothers, Benjamin and Robert, who were both engravers. Clayton was married twice in Ireland, first to Jane Maguire in 1800, and then to Emma Johnson in 1807. He was trained by his father, along with his brothers. Prints by Clayton appeared in Anthologica Hibernica in 1794 and 1795. He painted miniatures as well.

== Life in Australia ==
Clayton was found guilty of forgery, and was sentenced to transportation to New South Wales from Dublin for 7 years. He arrived on the Surrey in 1816. From 1817, he advertised his services as a portrait painter, and took up a position as an instructor in engraving, miniature painting, and "in ornamental painting and drawing". By 1818 he had started to deal in silver and jewellery, and was buying old silver. In 1817, Clayton engraved the banknotes of the Bank of New South Wales, for the Bank's 5 denominations. He was also the engraver of the first banknotes for the Van Diemen's Land Bank and in 1822 Lachlan and Waterloo Mills Companies' $1 and $2 notes. He also produced silhouette portraits.

On 1 October 1824, he received his ticket to leave. He then married a third time, Jane Lofthouse in October 1924. He had one son, Benjamin, who became a doctor in Sydney. He continues to appear in newspapers advertising as an engraver until the 1830s. Clayton died on 26 June 1853 in Gunning leaving his estate of £1,000 to his son, Benjamin. Most of his surviving work is his work in silver.
