= Robert Clayton (engraver) =

- Born: circa 1793; Dublin, Ireland
- Died: Australia
- Family: Benjamin Clayton I (father); Samuel Clayton (brother); Benjamin Clayton II (brother); Benjamin Clayton III (nephew)

Robert Clayton (born circa 1793) was an Irish wood engraver who engraved the first postage stamp of New South Wales.

== Early life and family ==
Robert Clayton was born in Dublin circa 1793. His father was wood engraver, Benjamin Clayton I. He had two older brothers, Samuel and Benjamin, who were also engravers.

== Career ==
=== Dublin ===
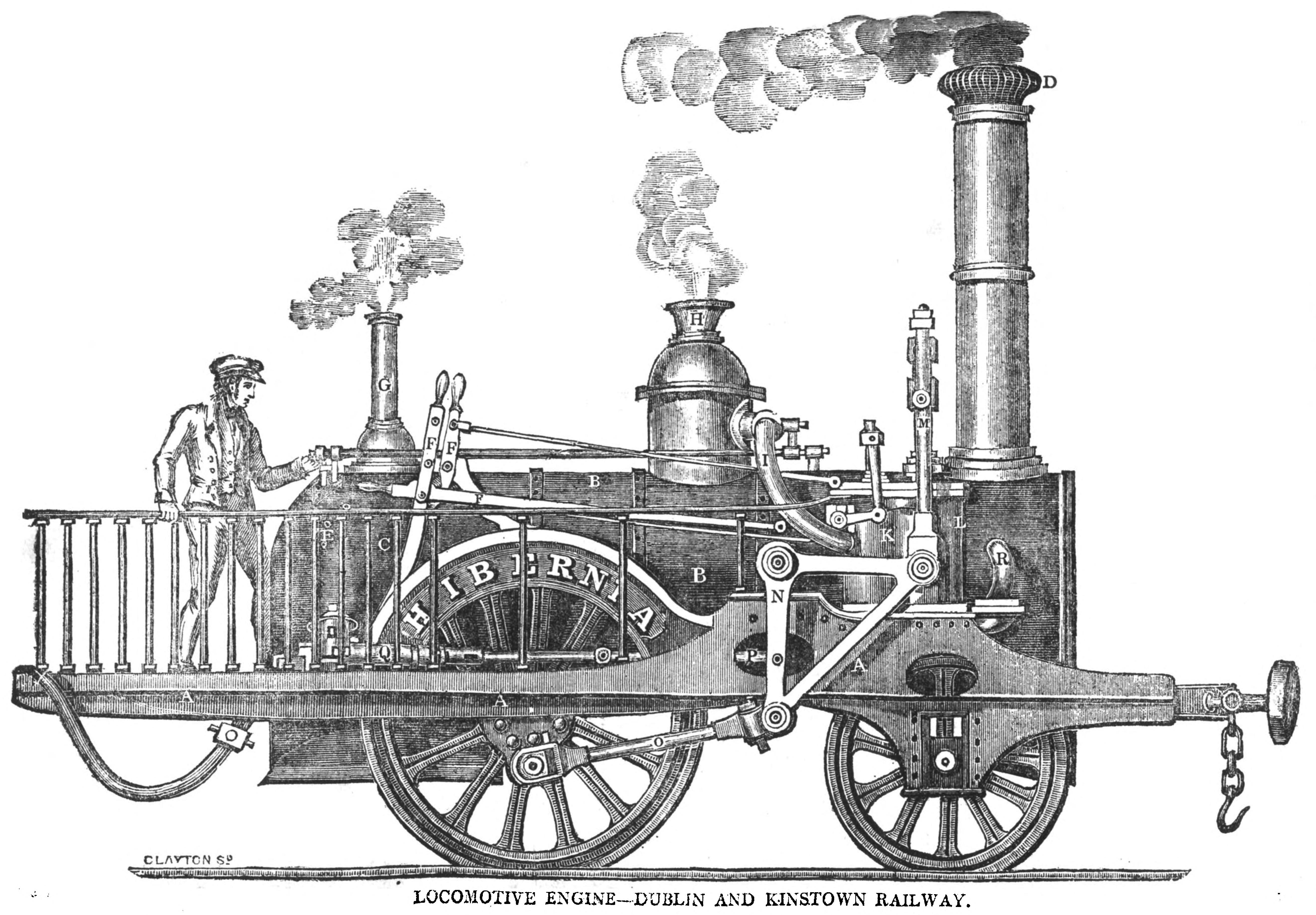
Hibernia locomotive

Clayton first worked as an assistant to his father.

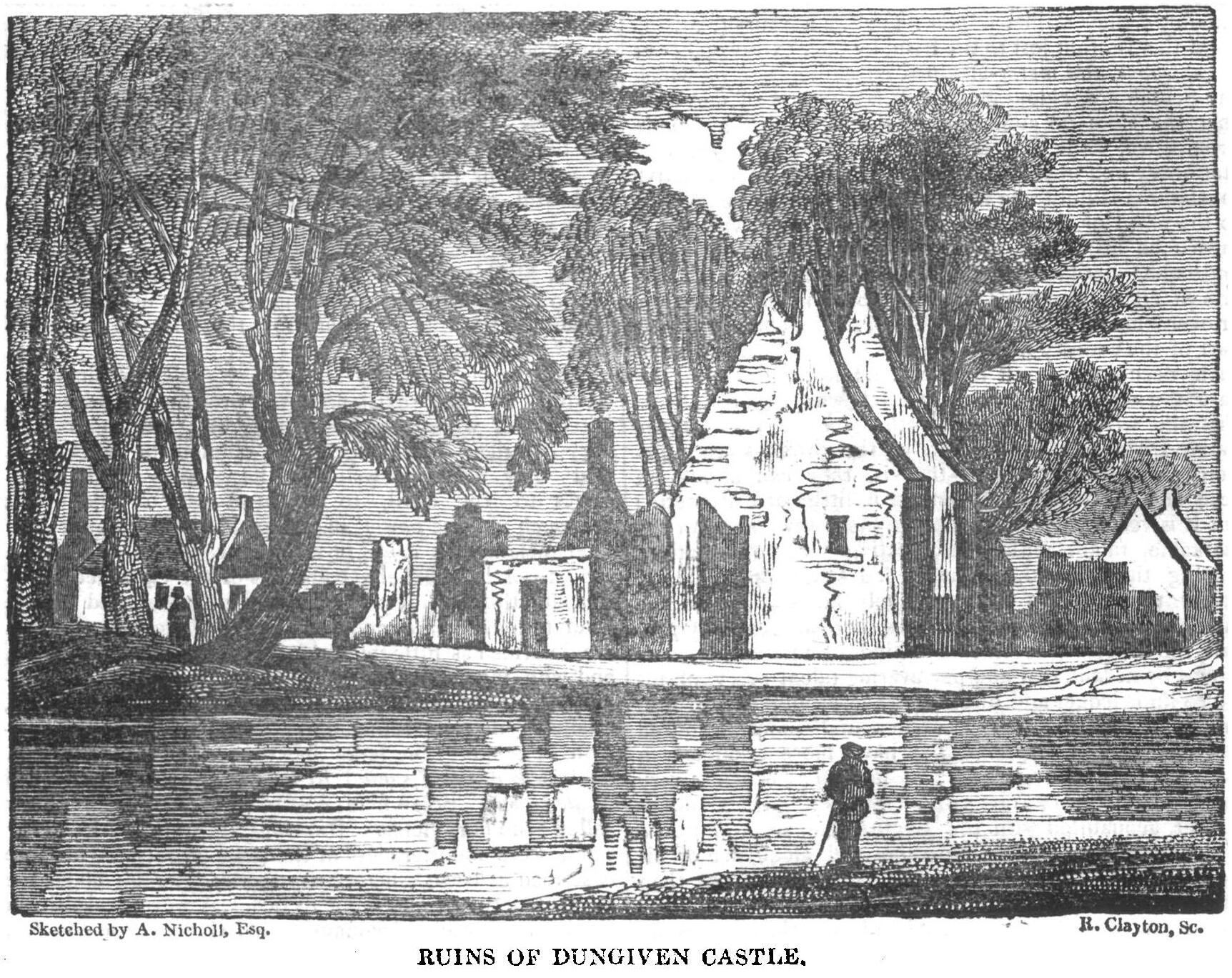
Ruins of Dungiven Castle, 1834, Dublin Penny Journal

Later working with his brother Benjamin, Clayton contributed to the Dublin Penny Journal in 1834 and 1835. Also in 1835, he engraved a series of 13 "Views of Dublin and Kingstown Railway" after Andrew Nicholl. Clayton was a drawing teacher, and worked as a polisher of cut glass decanters. Walter G. Strickland describes Clayton as "idle and a ne'er-do-well" who appears to have been convicted of "forgery and uttering stamps" with his son, Thomas, in February 1834.

=== Australia ===
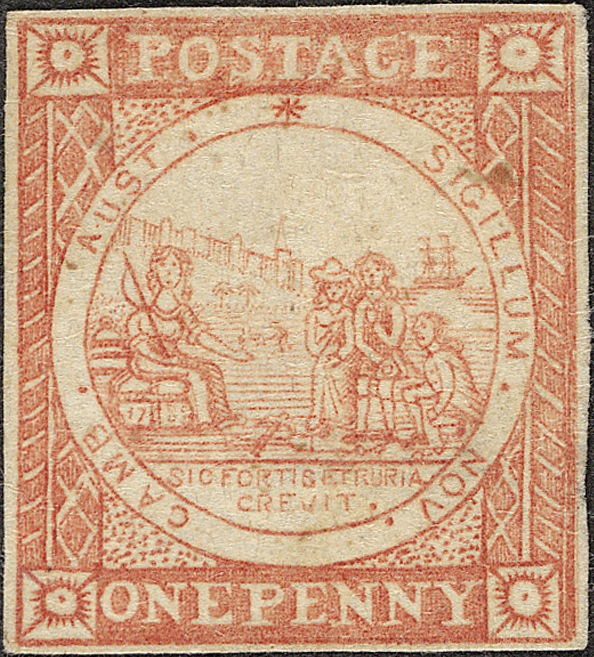
1850 red 1d stamp; the first issued in New South Wales. One of the "Sydney Views". Around the image is the text "Sigillum Nov. Camb. Aust." ("Seal of New South Wales") with the motto "Sic fortis Etruria crevit" ("thus mighty Etruria grew") underneath.

Clayton and his son travelled to New South Wales as free settlers, as they cooperated with the authorities, but were not permitted to leave the colony. They travelled on the Royal Admiral 3. Primarily, Clayton is thought to have worked with his brother, Samuel, who was also in Australia. Clayton has a number of identified plates in the 1838 Picture of Sydney by James Maclehose.

The first postage stamp issued in New South Wales, the 1p red stamp, from 1849 has been attributed to Clayton. His date of death is unknown.
