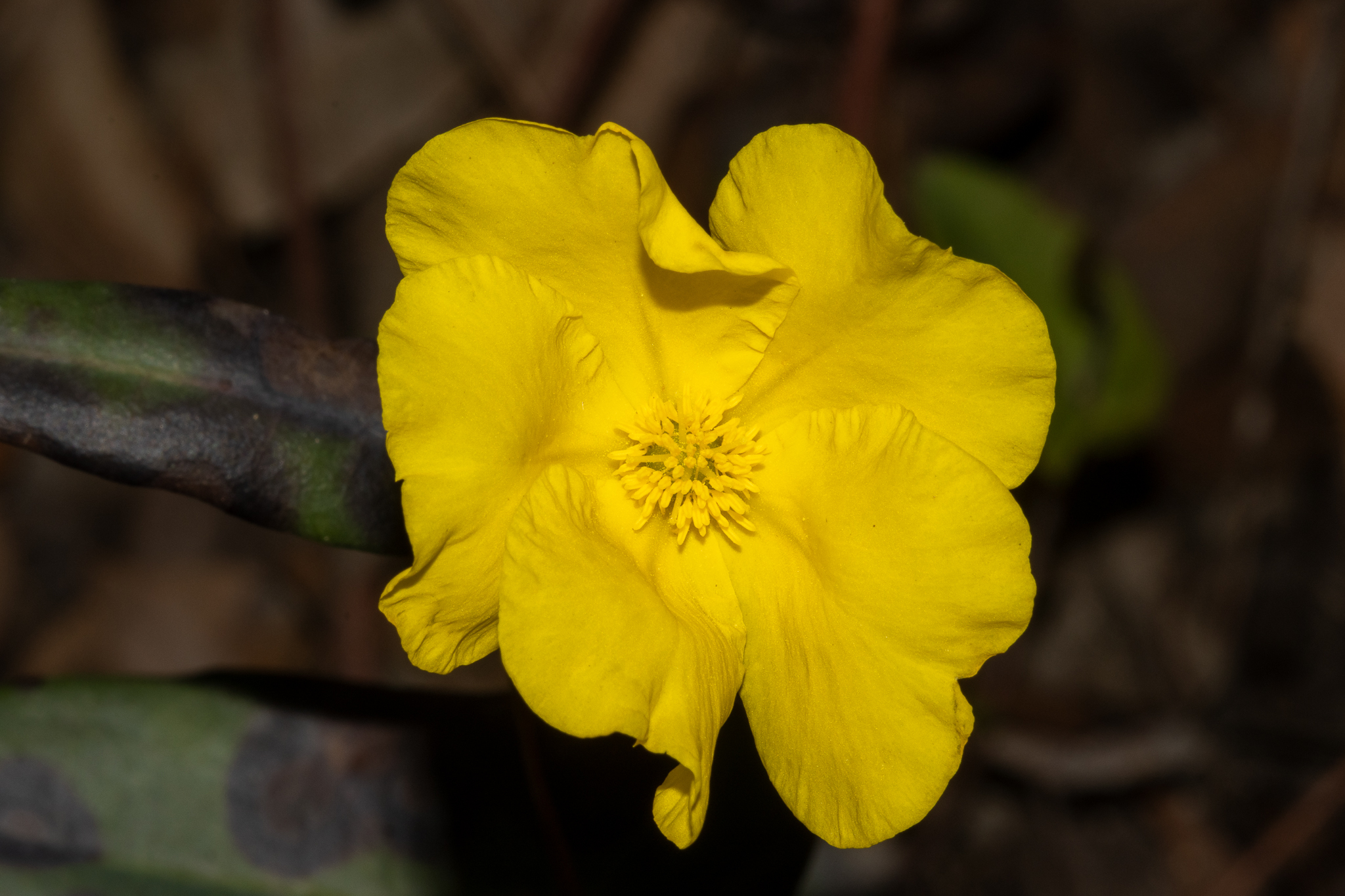
- Near Dwellingup, Western Australia

Scientific classification
- Kingdom: Plantae
- Clade: Tracheophytes
- Clade: Angiosperms
- Clade: Eudicots
- Order: Dilleniales
- Family: Dilleniaceae
- Genus: Hibbertia
- Species: H. cunninghamii

Binomial name
- Hibbertia cunninghamii Aiton ex Hook.

Synonyms
- Candollea cunninghami Ed.Otto orth. var.; Candollea cunninghamii (Aiton ex Hook.) Maund; Candollea cunninghamii (Aiton ex Hook.) Ed.Otto isonym; Hibbertia cunninghamii Aiton ex Hook. var. cunninghamii

= Hibbertia cunninghamii =

Species of flowering plant

Hibbertia cunninghamii is a species of flowering plant in the family Dilleniaceae and is endemic to the south-west of Western Australia. It is a shrub with a sprawling, straggling or ascending habit and typically grows to a height of 0.2–0.7 m (7.9 in – 2 ft 3.6 in). It blooms between August and December producing yellow flowers.

This species was first formally described in 1832 by William Jackson Hooker from an unpublished description by William Aiton. Hooker's description was published in Curtis's Botanical Magazine from specimens "introduced by Mr. Allan Cunningham from King George's Sound". The specific epithet (cunninghamii) honours Allan Cunningham.

Hibbertia cunninghamii grows on floodplains and in swampy areas in and around granite outcrops in the Avon Wheatbelt, Esperance Plains, Jarrah Forest, Swan Coastal Plain and Warren biogeographic regions of south-western Western Australia.

This species was revised in 2024.

== See also ==
- List of Hibbertia species
