= Samuel Bellin =

Samuel Bellin (London 13 May 1799 – 29 April 1893 London) was a British printmaker.

He was the son of John Bellin of Chigwell, Essex, and born at Doctors' Commons in London. He trained under the Huguenot James Basire the younger (1769–1822) before spending several years in Rome, where he came to know J. M. W. Turner, Frederick Catherwood and Bertel Thorvaldsen. While in Rome he made some excellent copies of celebrated pictures, and acquired great facility as a draughtsman.

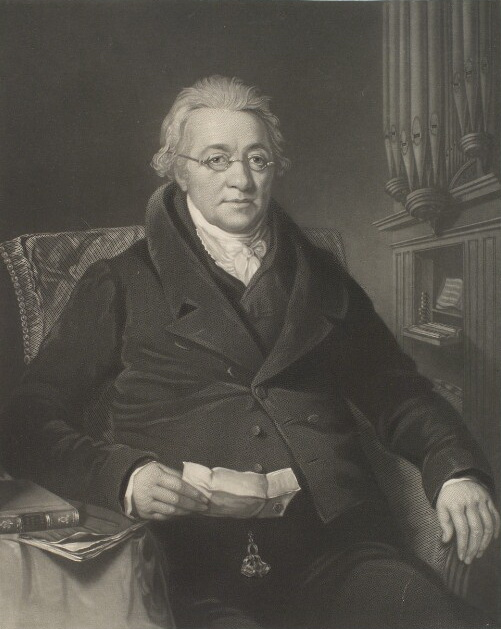
Christian Ignatius Latrobe by Samuel Bellin, after Thomas Barber

On his return to England, about 1834, he devoted himself to engraving, and became one of the leading workers in mezzotint and the mixed method. His plates, which are all from pictures by popular English painters of the day, include 'The Meeting of the Council of the Anti-Corn Law League,' after J. R. Herbert; 'Heather Belles,' after John Phillip; 'The Council of War in the Crimea,' after Augustus Egg; 'The Gentle Warning,' after Frank Stone; 'The Heart's Resolve,' and 'The Momentous Question,' after Sarah Setchell; 'Milton composing "Samson Agonistes,"' after J. C. Horsley; 'Opening of the Great Exhibition of 1851,' after H. C. Selous; 'Salutation to the Aged Friars,' after C. L. Eastlake; 'Dr. Johnson's Visit to Garrick,' after E. M. Ward; and portraits of Albert, Prince Consort, Lord John Russell, and the M.P. Joseph Hume. He produced his last plate in 1870, when he retired from the profession. Bellin drew and etched on three plates a panoramic view of Rome from Monte Pincio, which he published, with a dedication to Prince Augustus Frederick, Duke of Sussex, in 1835. He was an original member of the Graphic Society. He died at his house in Regent's Park Road, London, on 29 April 1893.
