= Caroline Millard =

Anglo-Irish wood engraver (died 1894)

- Born: Dublin, Ireland
- Died: 26 April 1894; Dublin, Ireland
- Family: Benjamin Clayton II (father); Benjamin Clayton I (grandfather); Benjamin Clayton III (brother); Ellen Creathorne Clayton (daughter)

Caroline Millard (also known as Mrs Millard) (died 26 April 1894) was an Irish wood engraver.

== Life ==
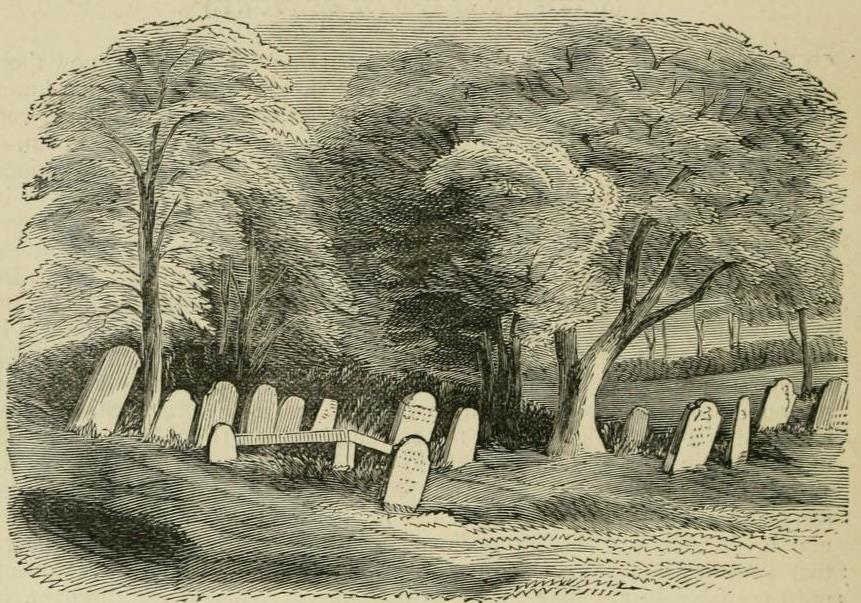
Moycreddin cemetery engraving by Millard (1874)

Caroline Millard was born Caroline Clayton in Dublin, she was the daughter of the wood engraver, Benjamin Clayton II. In 1841, she married the English cabinet-maker, Thomas Millard, who had moved to Dublin from Cheltenham in 1838. He went on to establish a photographic studio with James Simonton in 1856 on Sackville Street. He died on 6 February 1882. Millard died at her home, 10 Mount Pleasant Square, on 26 April 1894. She is buried in Mount Jerome. Her son, William Millard, became a sculptor. Her niece, by her brother Benjamin Clayton III, was the author Ellen Creathorne Clayton.

She trained as an engraver under her father, and had a successful engraving business in Dublin. In 1844, she won a prize from the Irish Art Union for her title page of Spirit of the Nation after Burton. Her engraving of Daniel Maclise's self-portrait appears in the 1871 memoir of Maclise by William Justin O'Driscoll. She ran her business from 58 Harcourt Street, and later 10 Mount Pleasant Square.
