= Ellen Creathorne Clayton =

Anglo-Irish author and artist

- Born: Eleanor Creathorne Clayton; 15 February 1834; Dublin
- Died: 19 July 1900 (aged 66); London
- Spouse: James Henry Needham (m. 1879)
- Father: Benjamin Clayton III
- Relatives: Benjamin Clayton II (grandfather); Benjamin Clayton I (great-grandfather); Caroline Millard (aunt)

Ellen Creathorne Clayton, Mrs Needham (15 February 1834 – 19 July 1900), born Eleanor Creathorne Clayton, was an author and artist. She wrote and illustrated novels, stories, and collections of historical biographies for young readers.

== Early life ==
Eleanor Creathorne Clayton was born in Dublin on 15 February 1834, but moved to London with her father in 1841. Her mother was Mary Grahame Clayton. Her father, Benjamin Clayton III, was a wood engraver. Her grandfather, Benjamin Clayton II, and her great-grandfather Benjamin Clayton I, were also wood engravers. Her aunt, Caroline Millard, was a wood engraver based in Dublin.

== Career ==
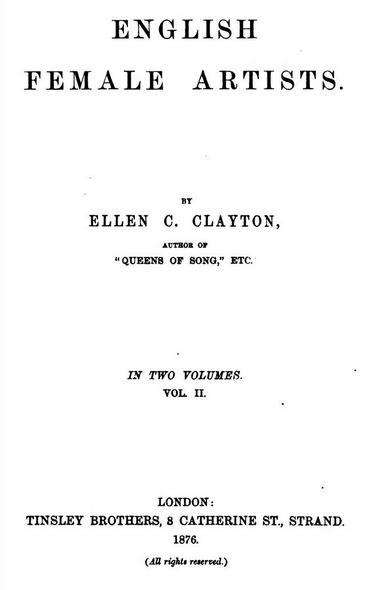
The title page of volume II of Clayton's English Female Artists (1876)

Clayton was contributing articles and illustrations from the age of fourteen to a number of papers including Sala's paper as well as two of her father's publications, Chat and Punchinello. Clayton wrote novels, compiled and illustrated biographical dictionaries, and created cards and calendars as well. She petitioned the Royal Academy of Arts to admit women as students in 1859.

== Publications ==
Though she is best known for her dictionary of English women painters, Clayton also wrote a number of novels and histories. The World Turned Upside Down is a slim collection of stories and poems, with colorful fantasy illustrations of a kite flying a boy, a tree sawing a man, fish flying while birds swim, animals observing humans at the zoo, and other striking reversals. One reviewer found Clayton's Queens of Song (1865) "clear and vivid in style, it is charming and readable, and cannot fail to become immensely popular."

- The World's Fair (1851)
- Notable Women: A Book for Young Ladies (1859, reprinted 1875)
- Women of the Reformation (1861)
- Cruel Fortune (1865, novel)
- Queens of Song: Being memoirs of some of the most celebrated female vocalists who have appeared on the lyric state, from the earliest days of opera to the present time: To which is added a chronological list of all the operas that have been performed in Europe (1865)
- The World Turned Upside Down (1875, short stories and poems for young readers)
- English Female Artists (2 volumes, 1876)
- Crying for Vengeance (3 volumes, 1877, novel)
- Female Warriors (1879)
- A Girl's Destiny (1882, novel)

== Personal life ==
In February 1879, Clayton married solicitor James Henry Needham, but she continued to publish under her maiden name. She died in a nursing home in London in 1900, at the age of 66.
