= Flower Painter in Ordinary =

Flower Painter in Ordinary, also called Flower Painter to the Queen, is a position in the United Kingdom awarded to a painter, and connected to the Queen. Holders of the office included:

- Joseph Barney, "Fruit and Flower Painter" to the Prince Regent
- Phoebe Earle (wife of Denis Dighton and sister of Augustus Earle), was "Fruit and Flower Painter" to Queen Adelaide
- Augusta Innes Withers, to Queen Adelaide and Queen Victoria
- Valentine Bartholomew to Queen Victoria (from before 1849 until his death in 1879)
- Helen Cordelia Angell to Queen Victoria (between 1879 and 1884)

== See also ==
- Principal Painter in Ordinary
- Peter Brown, Botanical Painter to the Prince of Wales in the late 18th century
