= Anna Maria Charretie =

English painter

Anna Maria Charretie, née Kennell (5 May 1819, Vauxhall – 5 October 1875, Campden Hill) was an English miniature painter and oil painter.

== Life ==
Charettie's father was an architect and surveyor. Leaving school at thirteen, she studied drawing under Valentine Bartholomew. In 1841 she married Captain John Charretie of the East India Company. She began exhibiting at the Royal Academy in 1843, having two portraits in oils there – 'Emily' and 'Sarah' – in 1852. On her husband's death in 1868, she supported herself by serious oil painting and copied several pictures in the National Gallery. She died suddenly from heart failure at her house, Horton Cottage, Campden Hill, Kensington.

== Work ==
Charretie sent forty miniatures to the Royal Academy, four to the British Institution, and thirty-two to Suffolk Street. She was also a regular exhibitor at the Dudley Gallery and often exhibited in the provinces.

'Lady Betty' and 'A Stone in her Shoe' appeared in 1870; 'Lady Teazle, behind the Screen' in 1871; 'Lady Betty's Maid' in 1873; and 'Mistress of herself tho' China fall', her last work, in 1875.
