= Sarah Setchel =

English water-colour painter

Sarah Setchel (1803–1894) was an English water-colour painter.

== Life ==
She was the daughter of John Frederick Setchel, a bookseller in King Street, Covent Garden, London. After leaving school, she took up drawing, self-taught, studying at the British Museum and the National Gallery, and took lessons in miniature-painting from Louisa Sharpe.

Setchel died at Sudbury, near Harrow, Middlesex, on 8 January 1894, aged 80.

== Works ==
Fanny, Setchel's first exhibited work, appeared at the Royal Academy in 1831, and she continued to exhibit there and at the Society of British Artists until 1840, when she sent to the Society A Scene from Howitt's Rural Life of England. She was elected in 1841 a member of the New Society of Painters in Water-colours, and in the following year contributed to its exhibition A Scene from "Smugglers and Poachers" in Crabbe's Tales of the Hall, representing a prison interior where a young man whose life is in jeopardy is visited by his betrothed. It became popular, and was engraved in mezzotint by Samuel Bellin as The Momentous Question. The Heart's Resolve, a subject from George Crabbe's tale of Jesse and Colin, exhibited in 1850, was engraved by Bellin as a companion plate.

Setchel continued to exhibit until 1867.
