= Helen Cordelia Angell =

English painter

- Born: Helen Cordelia Coleman; January 1847; Horsham, Sussex
- Died: 8 March 1884 (aged 37); Kensington
- Known for: Painting
- Spouse: Thomas William Angel (m. 1874)

Helen Cordelia Angell, née Coleman (1847 – 1884) was an English watercolour painter.

== Biography ==
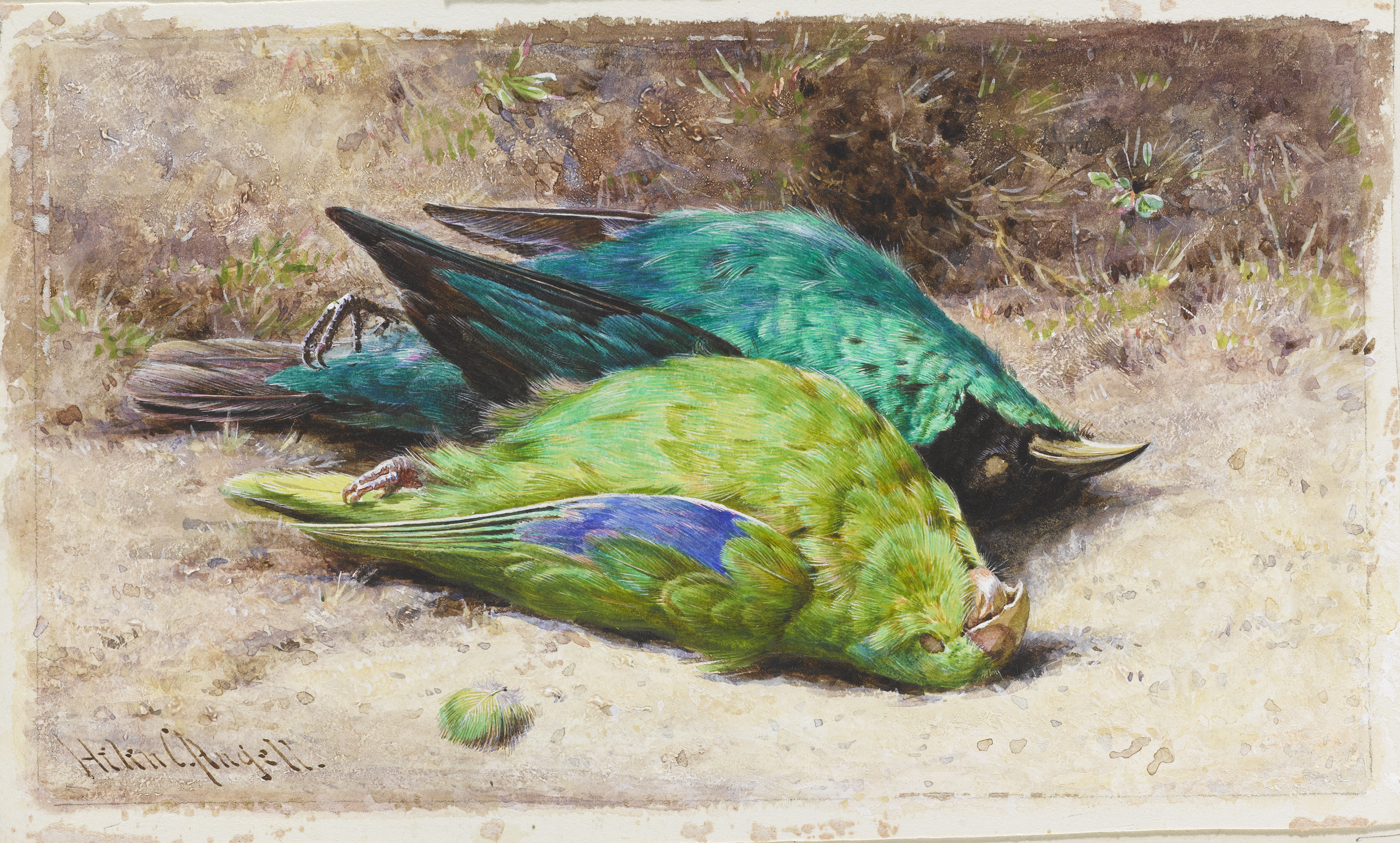
Study of Dead Birds - Helen Cordelia Angell - 62 1924 82

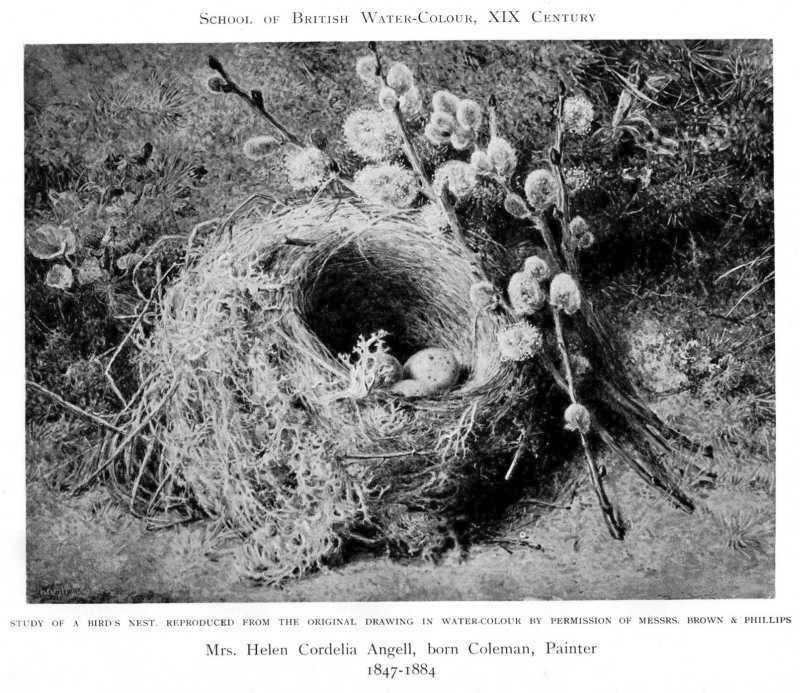
Study of a bird's nest

Angell was the fifth daughter of the twelve children of Henrietta Dendy and William Thomas Coleman, a physician. She was schooled at home. Along with her sister, pottery artist Rose Rebecca Coleman, she learned painting and drawing from their older brother William Stephen Coleman, who kept an art pottery studio in South Kensington.

Her early watercolour paintings were first exhibited in the Dudley Gallery in London in 1864. She married Thomas William Angell on 15 October 1874. He was a postmaster and an amateur artist.

Angell was a member of both the Royal Watercolour Society and the Royal Institute of Painters in Water Colours, who awarded her a membership in 1875. Before his death, watercolour painter William Henry Hunt named Coleman his only successor.

She was Flower Painter in Ordinary to Queen Victoria from 1879 until her death. Her painting Study of a bird's nest was included in the 1905 book Women Painters of the World. Her work can be found in the collection of the Victoria & Albert Museum.

Angell died from uterine cancer at the age of 37 on 8 March 1884.
