= Benjamin Clayton I =

Irish artist

- Born: circa 1754; Dublin, Ireland
- Died: 1814 (aged 59–60); Ryder's Row, Dublin
- Family: Samuel Clayton (son); Benjamin Clayton II (son); Robert Clayton (son); Benjamin Clayton III (grandson); Caroline Millard (granddaughter); Ellen Creathorne Clayton (great-granddaughter)

Benjamin Clayton I (circa 1754 – 1814) was an Irish wood engraver.

== Life ==
Benjamin Clayton I was born in Dublin around 1754. His father was a clock-maker. Clayton was married twice. He had 3 sons with his first wife, Samuel, Benjamin, and Robert, who all became engravers. He married a second time in 1812, to his servant maid, Mary Woods. He died at Ryder's Row in 1814.

Clayton entered the Dublin Society Schools in 1766, and went on win prizes for "pattern drawing" in 1769 and 1770. He worked as an engraver, initially from Great Britain Street, and from 1807, 1 Ryder's Row. His work was primarily book illustrations. Examples of his work can be found in The Sentimental and Masonic Magazine in 1794 to 1795. In 1796, he engraved "View of Loughlinstown Camp" and "A View of Sarah Bridge" after J. H. Campbell for John Ferrar's View of Dublin. He also etched political and other caricatures including "The City Fox running away with the Farmer's Goose". Clayton also engraved mathematical instruments and clocks, as well as the seal of the Corporation of the Borough of Baltinglass in 1800.
