= Valentine Bartholomew =

English painter

Bartholomew in 1864.

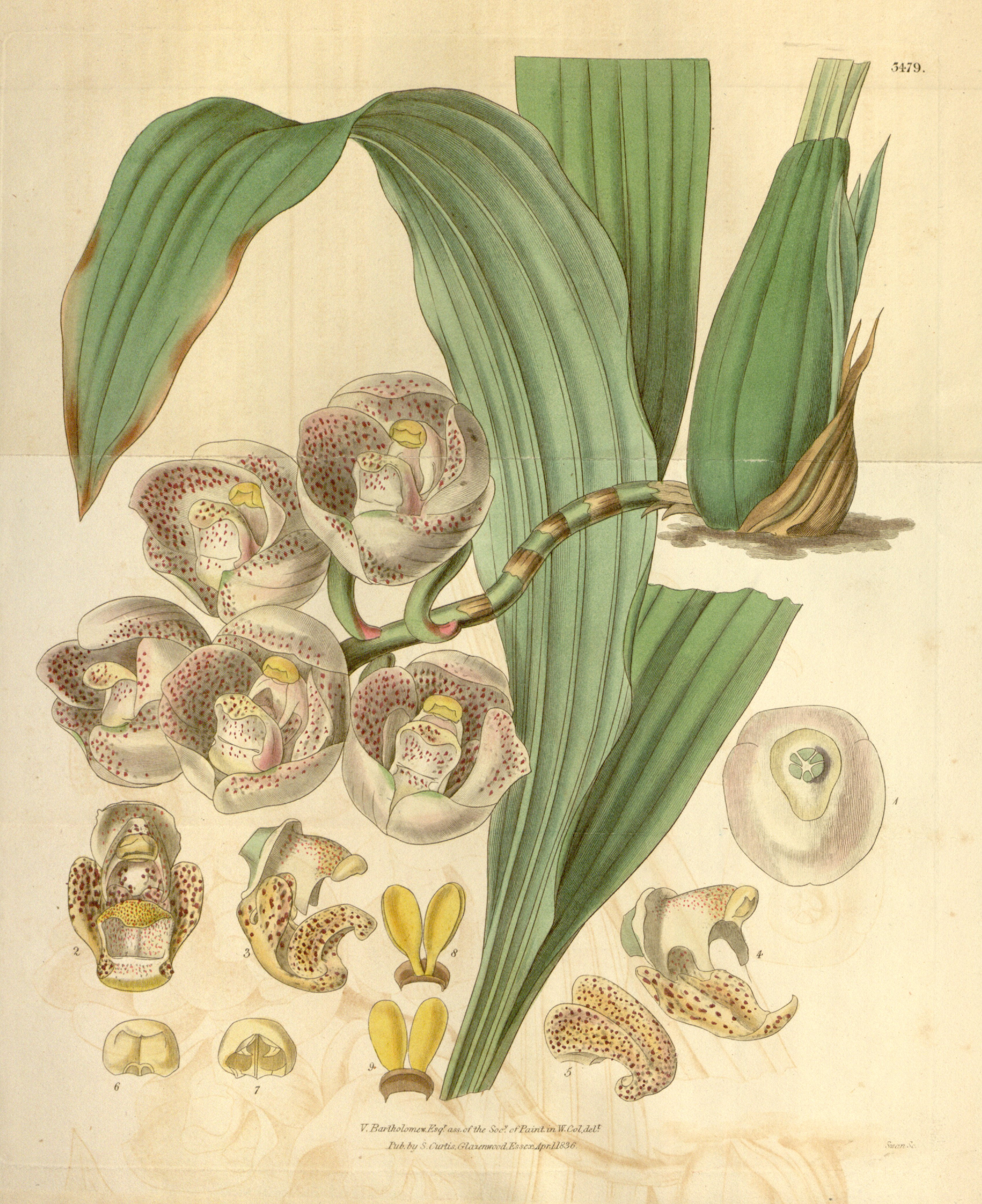
Illustration of Peristeria pendula by Valentine Bartholomew, 1836

Valentine Bartholomew (18 January 1799 – 21 March 1879) was an English flower painter.

== Life ==
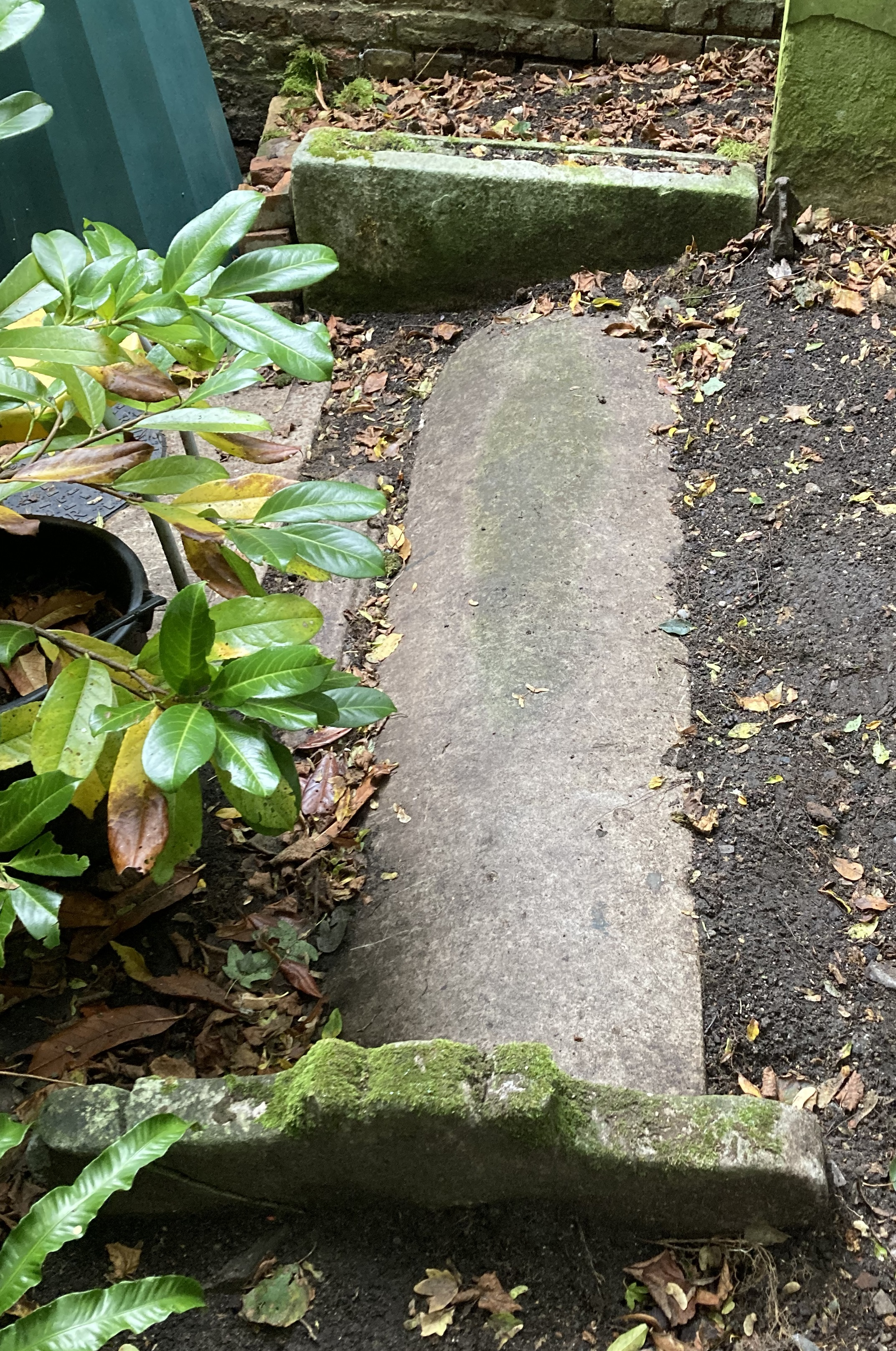
Grave of Valentine and Ann Bartholemew in Highgate Cemetery

Bartholomew had some professional instruction in art early on, but was largely self-taught. Between 1821 and 1827, he worked for and lived with the lithographer Charles Hullmandel, whose daughter Adelaide he married at the end of this period. She died in January 1839, and the next year, he married Ann Charlotte Turnbull (d. 1862), an author and flower and miniature painter, the widow of the composer Walter Turnbull.

Bartholomew was an early member of the Society of Painters in Water Colours, which he joined in 1835. He had a special talent for flower painting, a branch of art which he pursued with much success, his works being chiefly remarkable for the great care and the large scale on which they were carried out. 'Azaleas ' and "Camellias" are in the collection of the Victoria and Albert Museum. Bartholomew held for many years the post of Flower Painter in Ordinary to the Queen from 1837.

He died in his 80th year on 21 March 1879 and is buried on the western side of Highgate Cemetery with his wife Ann. The grave (plot no.11876) is immediately to the right of the north gatekeeper's lodge.
