= Benjamin Clayton II =

Irish artist

- Born: 1786; Dublin, Ireland
- Died: 17 November 1862 (aged 75–76); Dublin
- Family: Benjamin Clayton I (father); Samuel Clayton (brother); Robert Clayton (brother); Benjamin Clayton III (son); Caroline Millard (daughter); Ellen Creathorne Clayton (granddaughter)

Benjamin Clayton II (1786 – 17 November 1862) was an Irish wood engraver.

== Life ==
Benjamin Clayton II was born in Dublin in 1786, and was baptised in St John's Church. His father was wood engraver, Benjamin Clayton I. He had two brothers, Samuel and Robert, who were both engravers. He married Eleanor Creathorne in 1808, while still living with his father on Ryder's Row. They had 3 sons and 3 daughters. All 3 sons, Benjamin, Robert, and Jeffrey Creathorne, and one of his daughters, Caroline, all became engravers. Clayton died in Ashton, County Dublin on 17 November 1862.

Clayton was primarily a wood engraver, and contributed to Dublin Penny Journal and the Catholic Penny Magazine. In 1820 his engraving "Wood Quay and N.E. Suburbs" appeared in Hardiman's History of Galway, and "The Interior of the House of Lords as prepared for the Trial of Queen Caroline" in The Freeman's Journal. The latter is possibly the first illustration in a Dublin daily newspaper aside from those in small advertisements. Clayton developed a new method of printing on textiles, which he exhibited at the London Exhibition in 1851. Clayton moved to London in 1841, following his son Benjamin Clayton III, where he worked with W. S. Johnson and Dean & Son. He returned to Dublin in 1856, working primarily for his son-in-law, Joseph Le Petit, who was married to his daughter, Mary Anne.

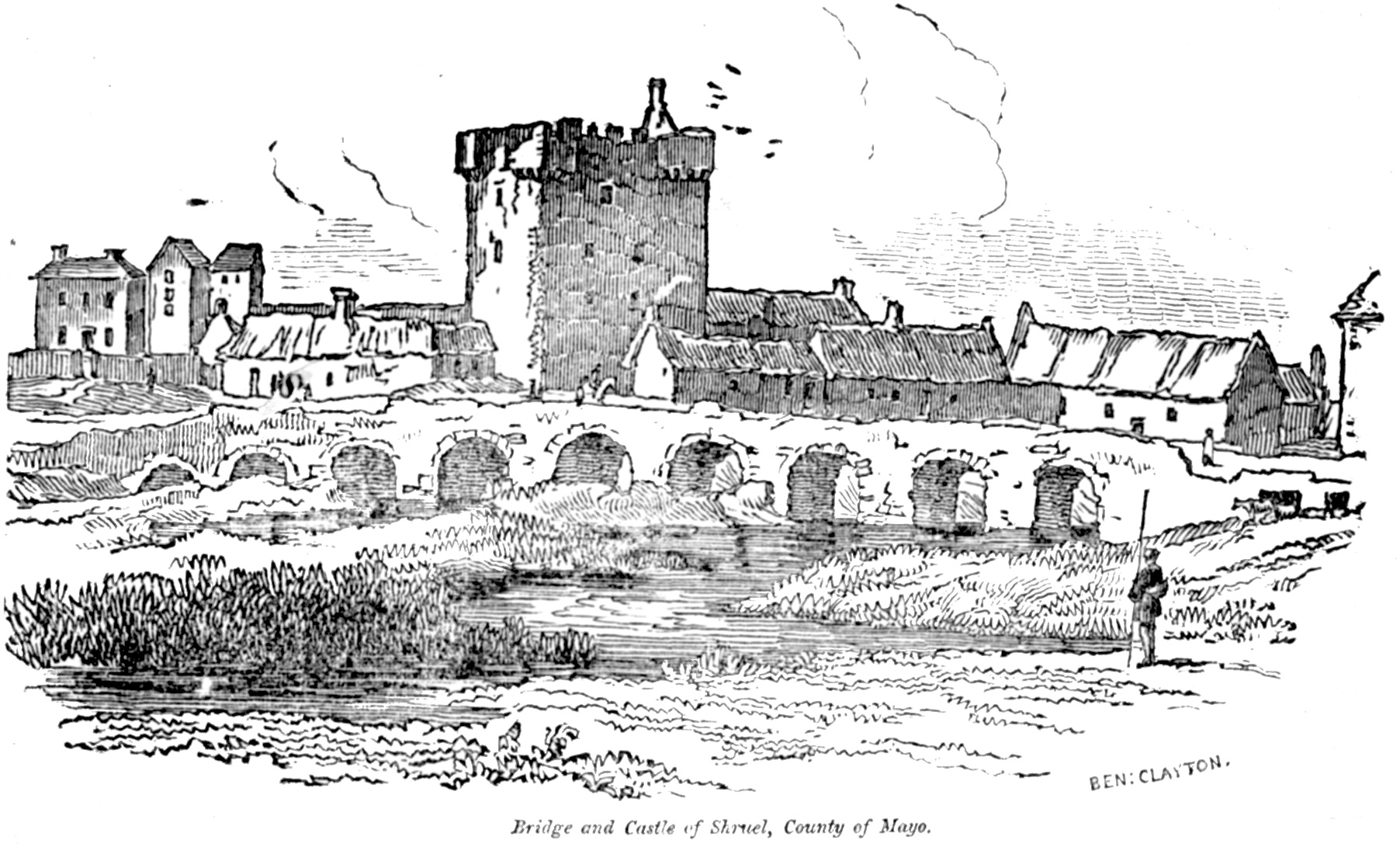
Bridge and castle of Shruel, County of Mayo. Dublin Penny Journal (1833)
