= Augusta Innes Withers =

English natural history illustrator

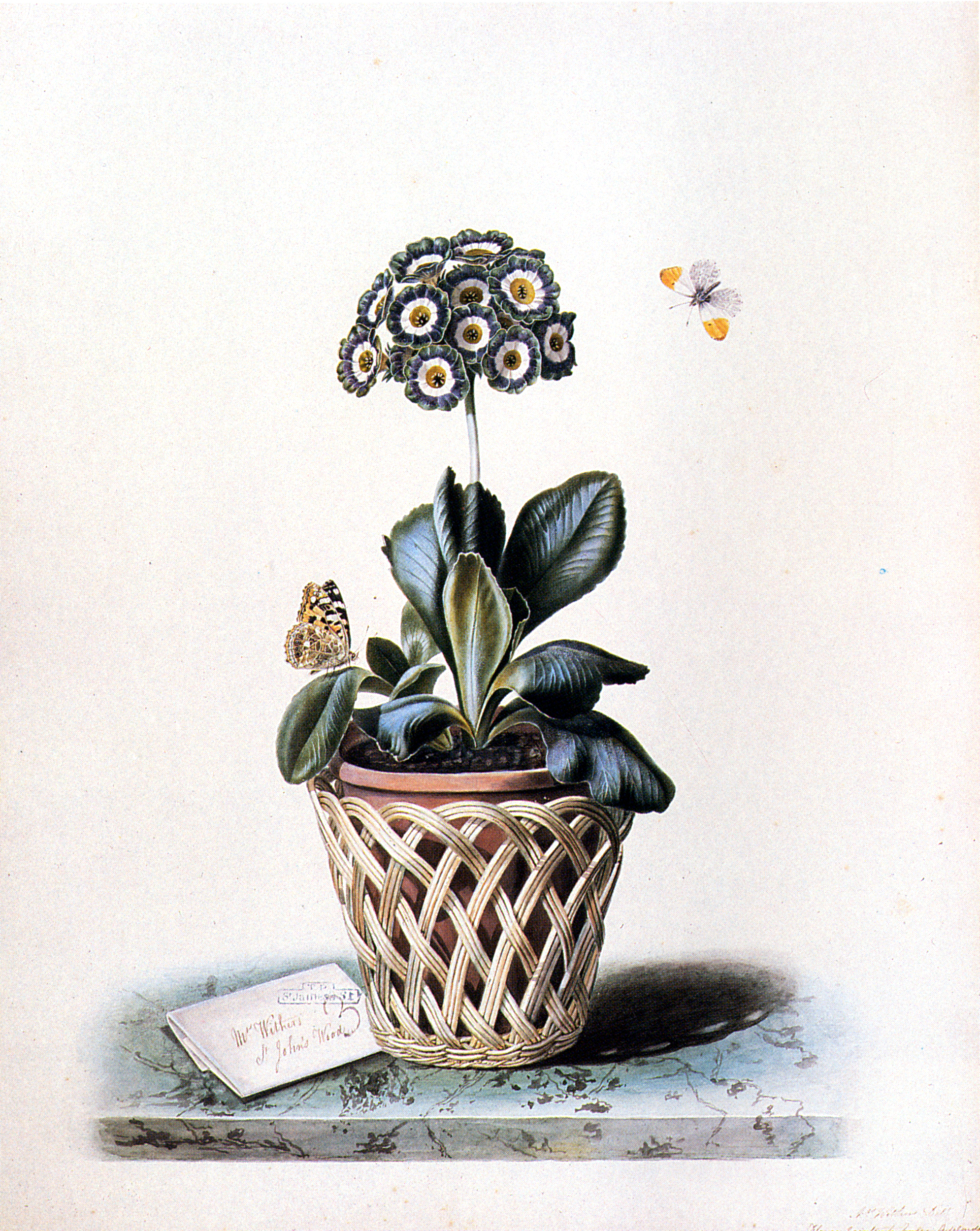
- Born: Augusta Hanna Elizabeth Innes Baker; 1792; Gloucestershire, England
- Died: 1876 (aged 83–84); London
- Burial place: Highgate Cemetery
- Occupation: Illustrator
- Spouse: Theodore Withers

Augusta Hanna Elizabeth Innes Withers (née Baker; 1792, Gloucestershire – 1876, London) was an English natural history illustrator, known for her illustrating of John Lindley's Pomological Magazine and her collaboration with Sarah Drake on the monumental Orchidaceae of Mexico and Guatemala by James Bateman. She was appointed "Flower Painter in Ordinary" to Queen Adelaide and later to Queen Victoria. She also produced illustrations for Benjamin Maund's Botanis, the Transactions of the Horticultural Society of London, the Illustrated Bouquet (1857-1863) and Curtis's Botanical Magazine.

== Family background ==
Augusta was the daughter of a Gloucestershire vicar, chaplain to the Prince Regent. She lived in London all her life and was married to Theodore Gibson Withers, an accountant, who was 20 years her senior. They were married on 23 July 1822 in Marylebone. She died in 1876 and was buried in the Withers family grave on the western side of Highgate Cemetery on the 14th August 1876.

== Career ==
Besides giving painting classes, she was active as a painter from before 1827 until 1865, exhibiting from 1829 to 1846 at the Royal Academy, the Society of British Artists and the New Watercolour Society as well as the Society of Female Artists in 1857 and 1858, and where she was a founder member.

John Claudius Loudon commented in the 1831 Gardener's Magazine that her talents were of the highest order, and that "to be able to draw flowers botanically, and fruit horticulturally, that is, with the characteristics by which varieties and subvarieties are distinguished, is one of the most useful accomplishments of your ladies of leisure, living in the country."

In 1815, in an attempt to clarify the nomenclature of cultivated fruit varieties and reduce the number of synonyms in common use, William Jackson Hooker initiated a project of fruit drawings in watercolour stretching over 10 volumes. Suffering a stroke in 1820, Hooker was unable to finish the work. Four other artists, including Augusta Innes Withers and Barbara Cotton were commissioned to complete the work, ironic since Withers had been refused a position as a botanical artist by Hooker's son, Joseph Dalton Hooker.

Withers painted the 12 colour plates for Robert Thompson's The gardener's assistant.

== Legacy ==
Her drawings are stored at the Natural History Museum, London, at the Royal Horticultural Society, and at the Fitzwilliam Museum of the University of Cambridge. There are a few of her letters at Windsor Castle.

== Illustrations ==
Paintings by Augusta Innes Withers
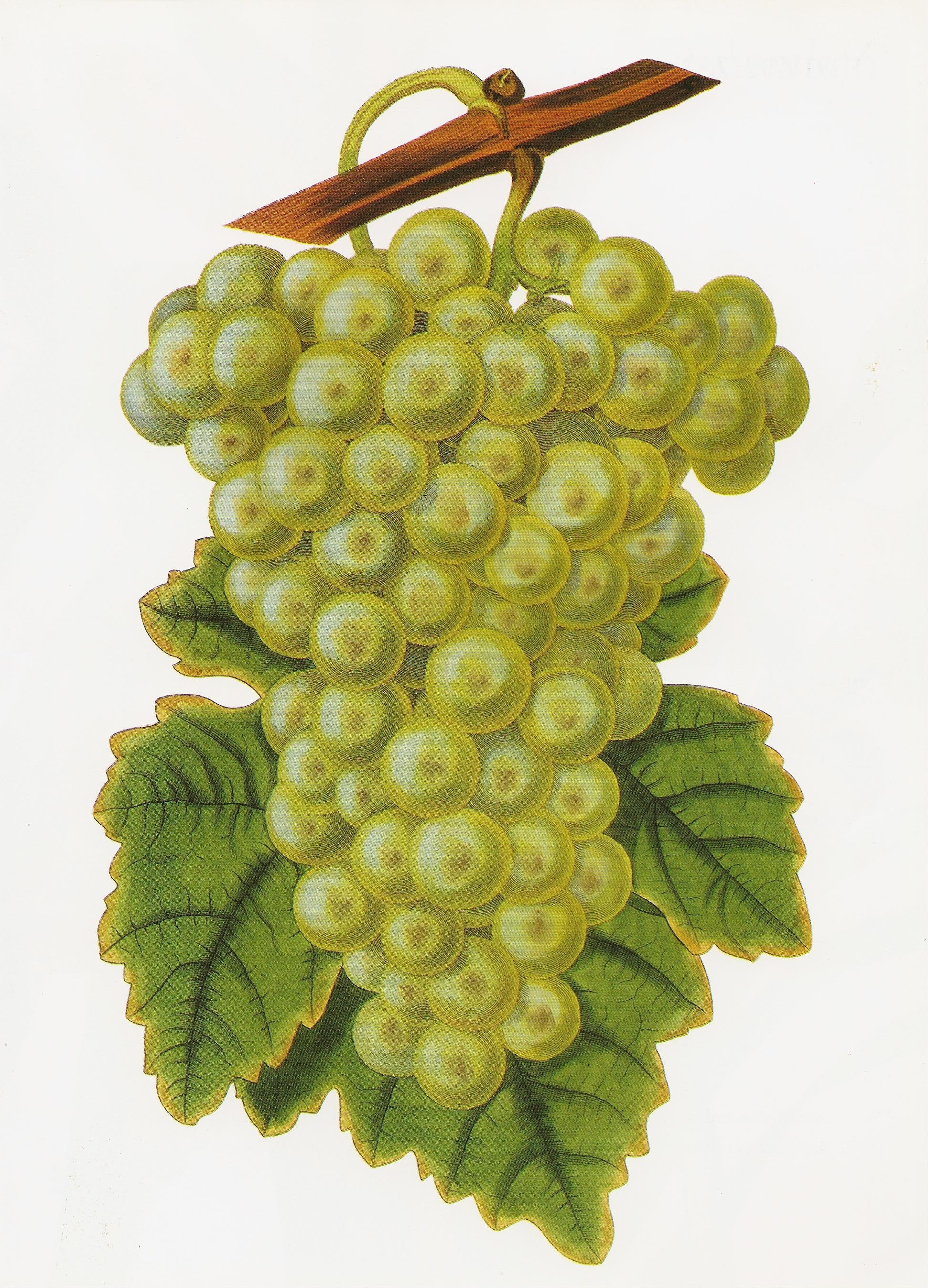
Vitis rotundifolia

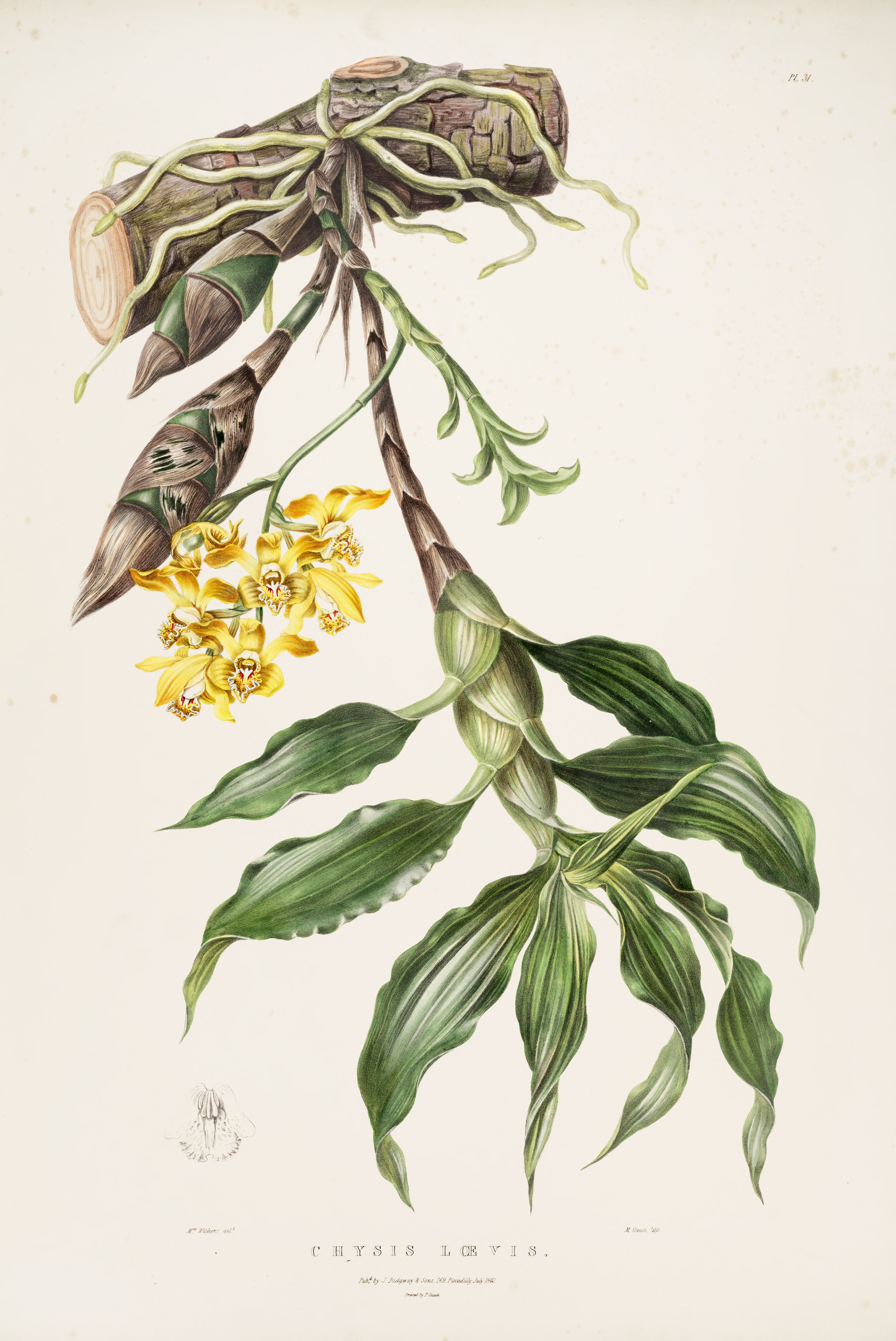
Chysis laevis orchid

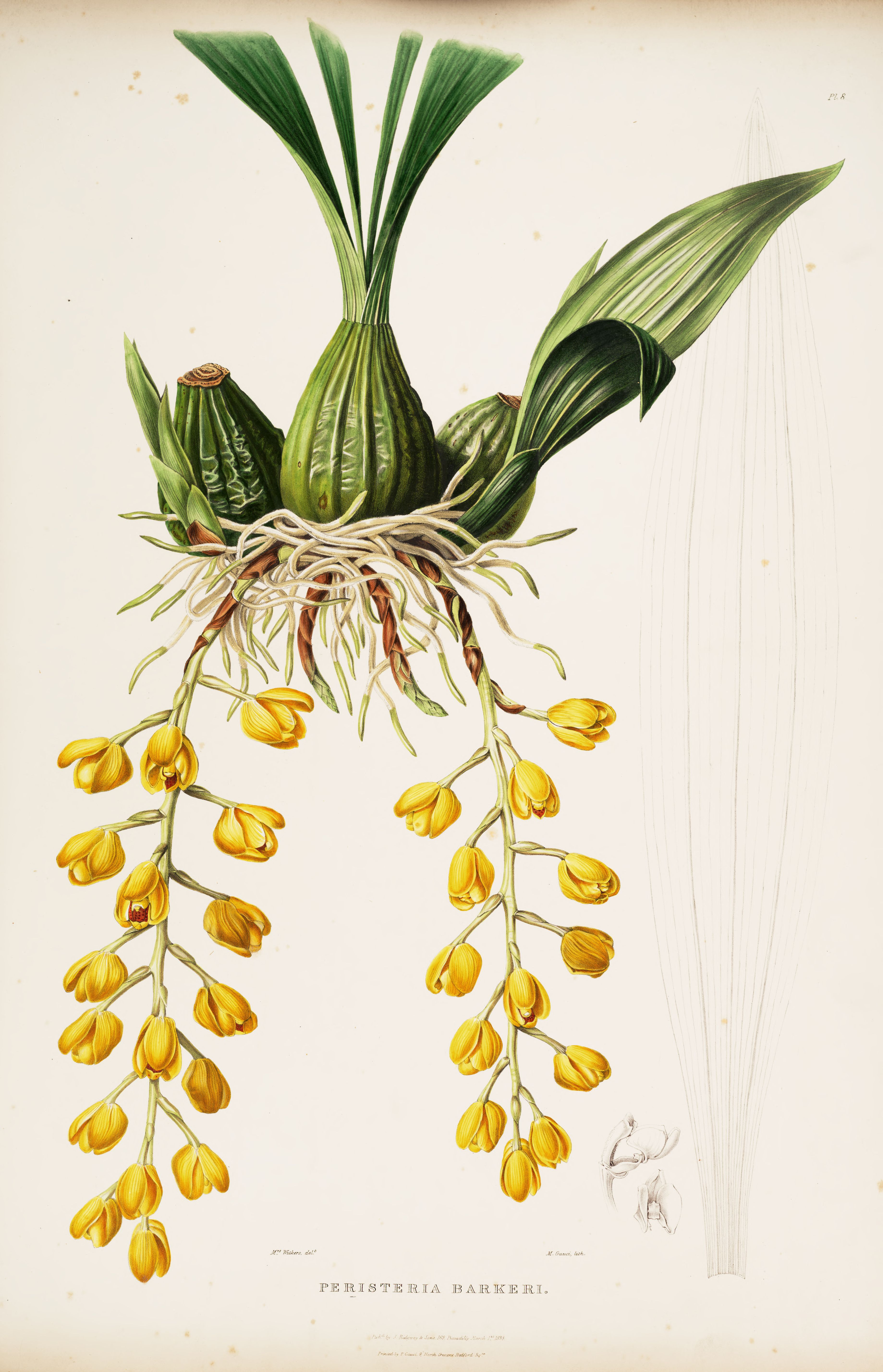
Acineta barkeri orchid

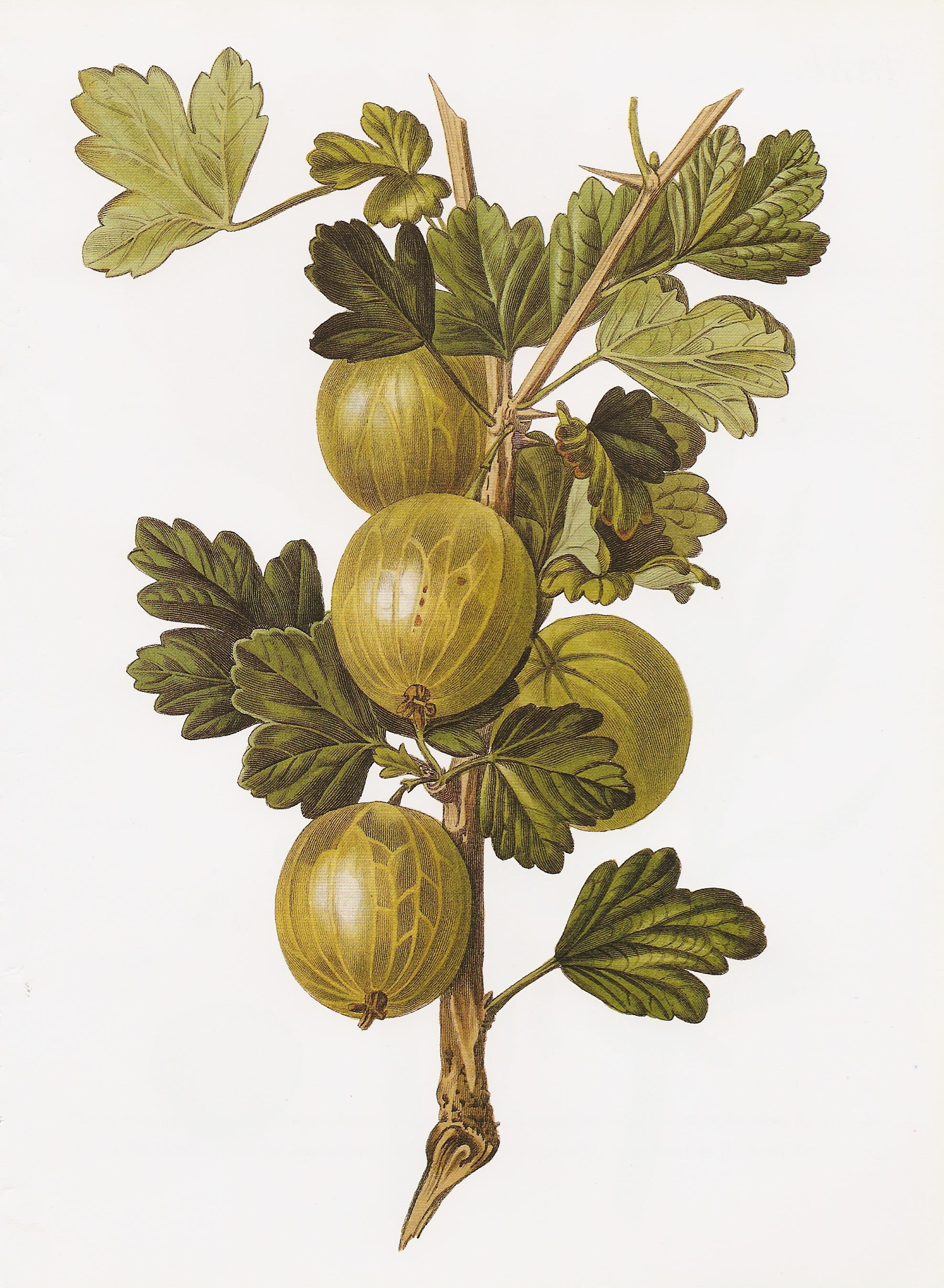
Ribes uva-crispa

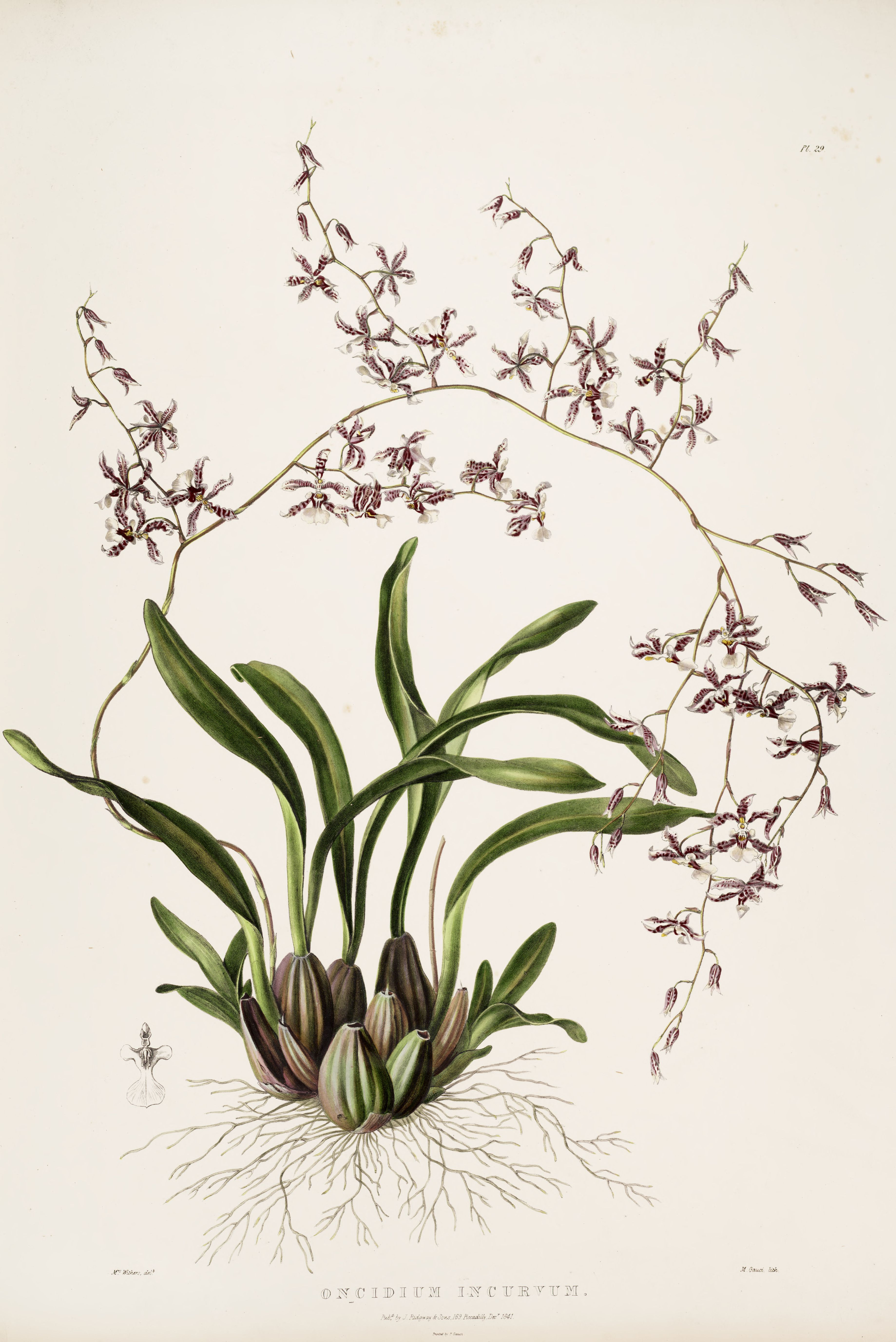
Oncidium incurvum orchid

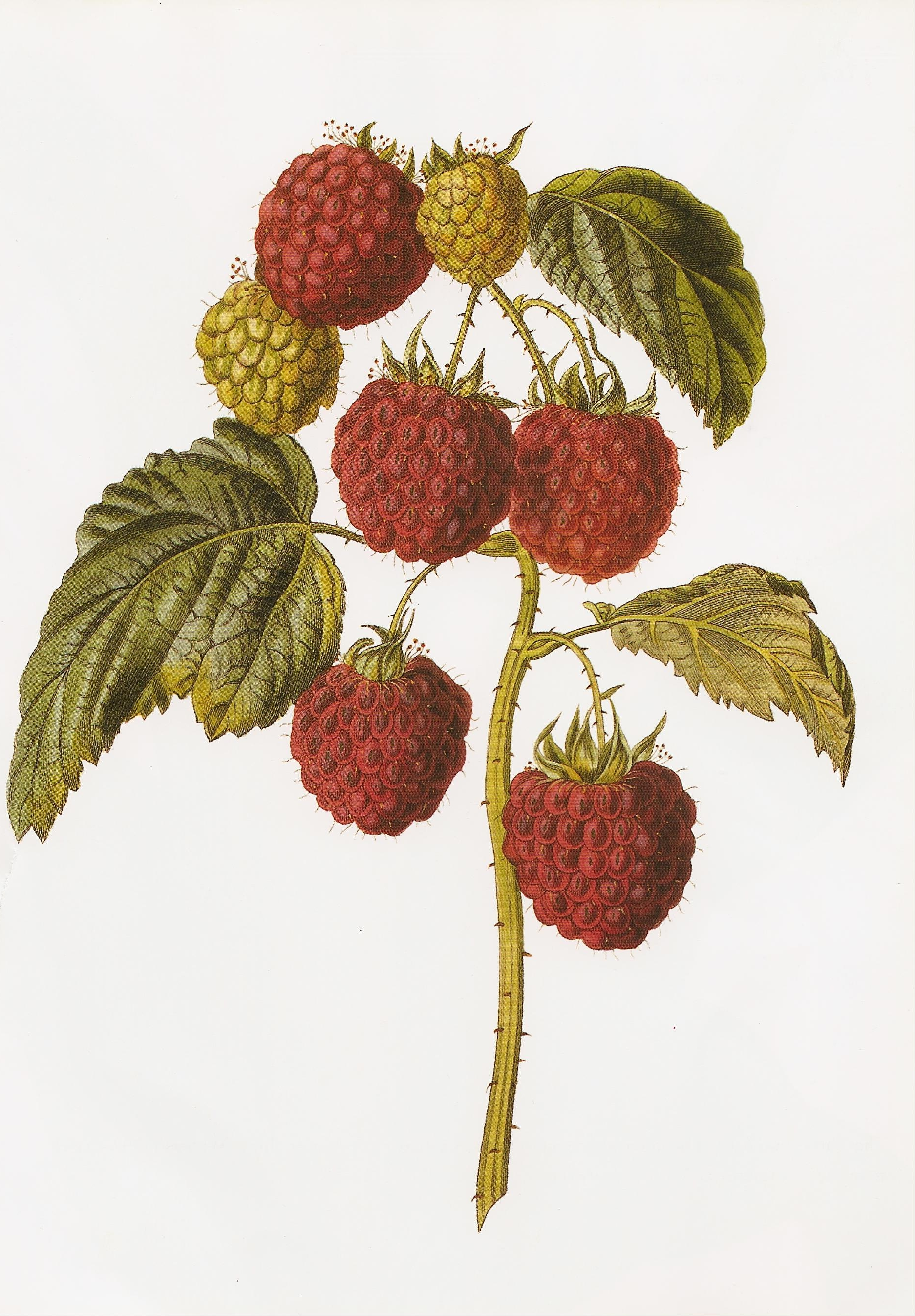
raspberry Barnet

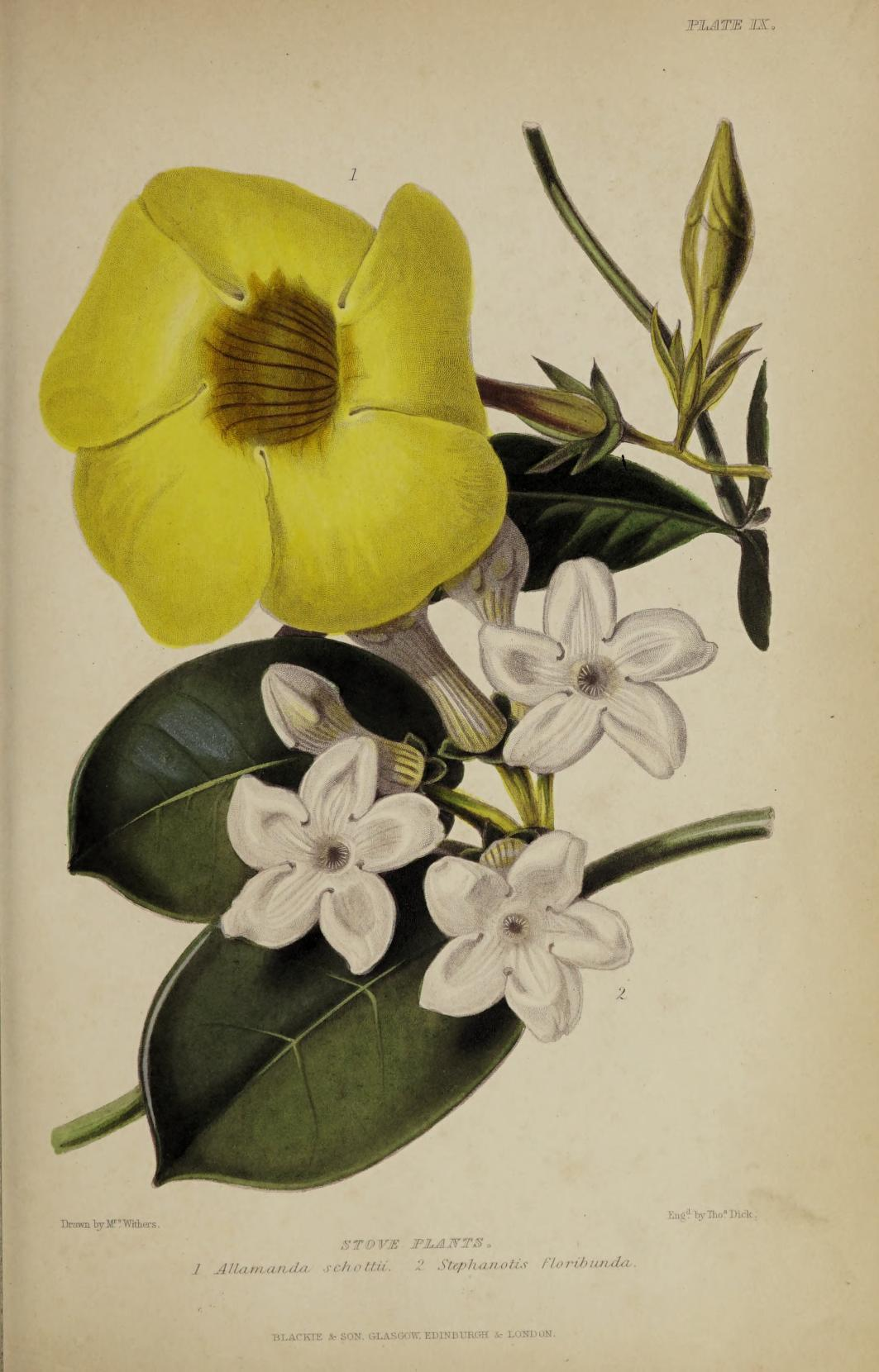
Allamanda Schottii

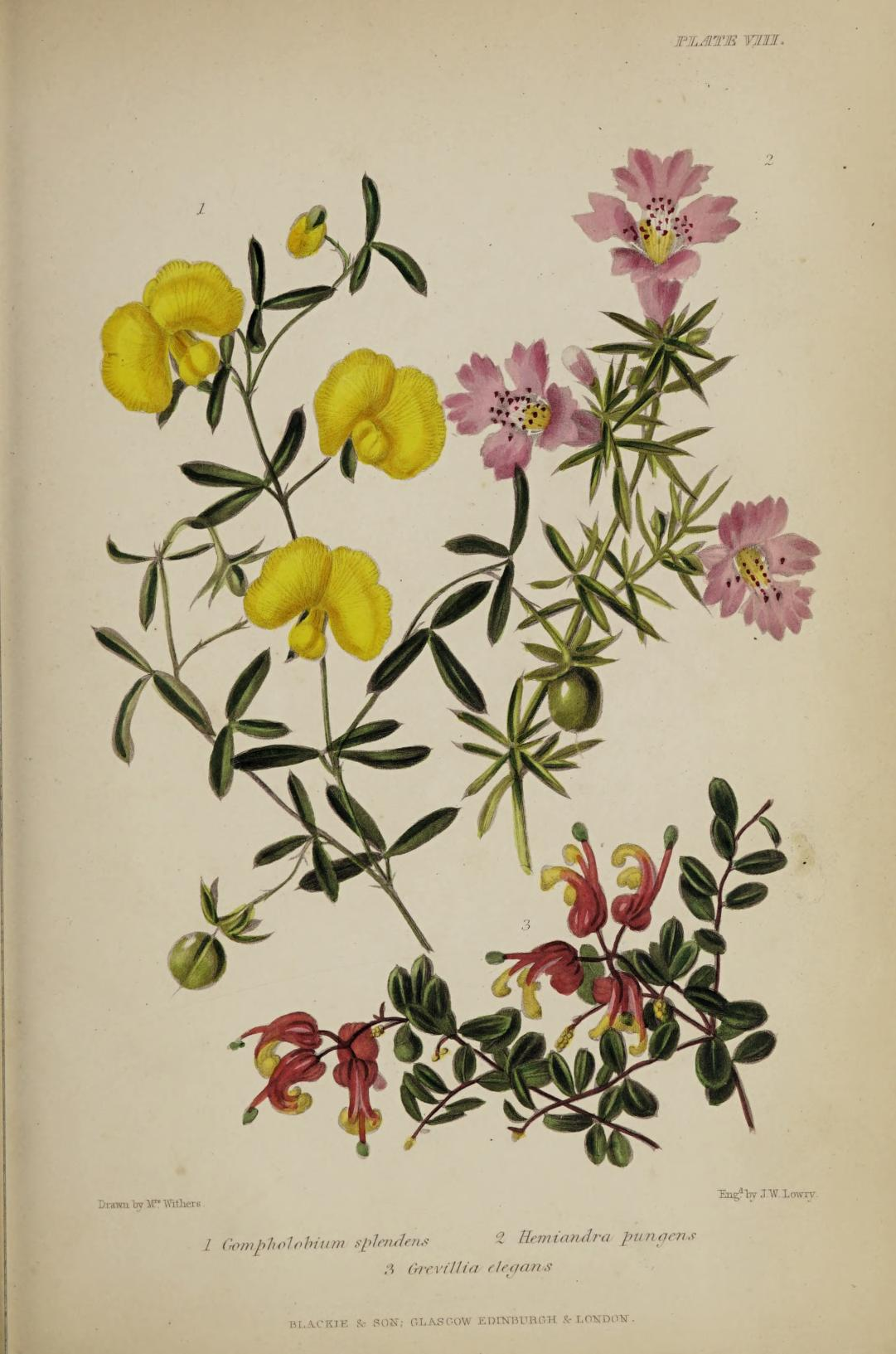
Gompholobium splendens
