= Emma Walter =

English artist

Emma Walter (born 1833/1834, died 1893) was an English artist, known for her watercolour paintings of flowers, fruit and still lifes.

The daughter of Edward Walter, a civil servant, she was born in London and largely self-taught, she began drawing at the age of five. In 1855, she first submitted her paintings to the Society of British Artists, continuing to exhibit with them until 1875. In total during her career Walter exhibited some sixty-six paintings at the Society's Suffolk Street gallery. She also began exhibiting at the Royal Academy in 1855, continuing until 1887. Around 1857, she was elected to the Society of Female Artists. In 1872, she became an associate of the Liverpool Society of Painters in Water Colours and also received a bronze medal for her work from the Royal Cornwall Polytechnic Society.

Walter also exhibited at the Royal Scottish Society, the Royal Hibernian Academy and the Royal Glasgow Institute of the Fine Arts.
