= Norman Prescott-Davies =

English painter and illustrator

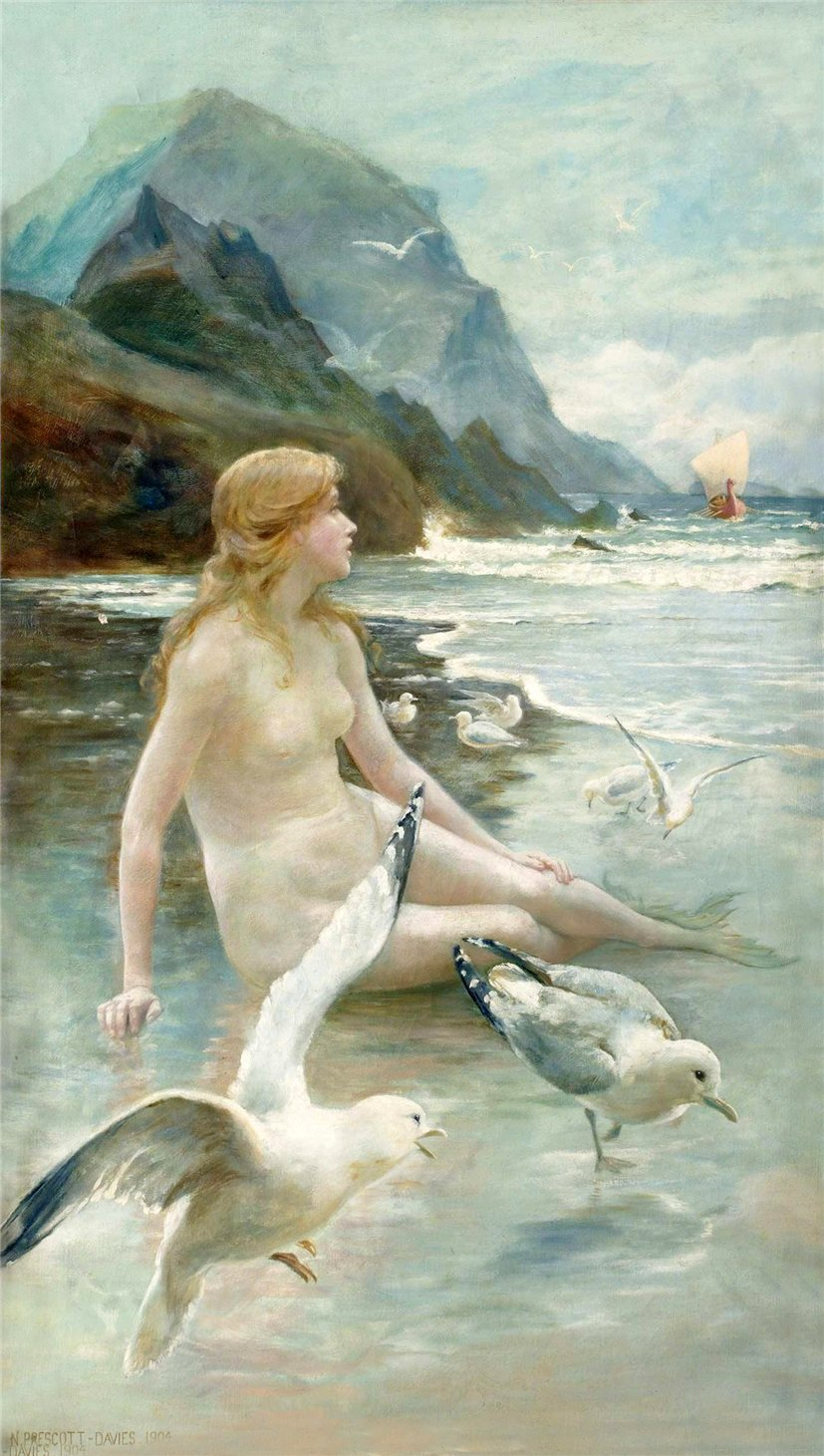

Norman Prescott-Davies (1862–1915) was an English painter and illustrator.

Davies was born in Isleworth, and studied at the London International College and South Kensington. He was elected Associate of the Royal College of Art in 1891, and to the Royal Society of British Artists in 1893.

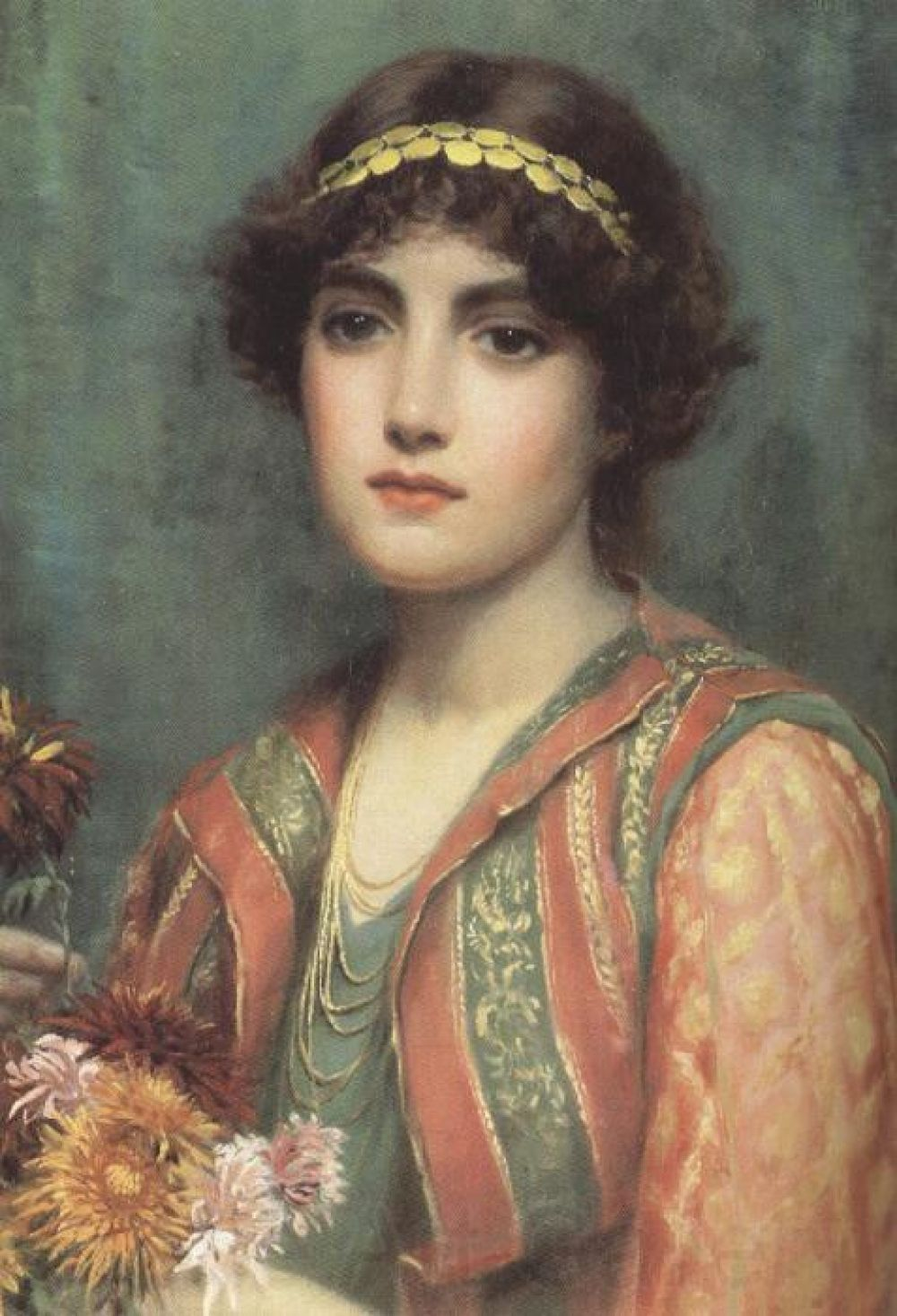
An Eastern beauty, 1881

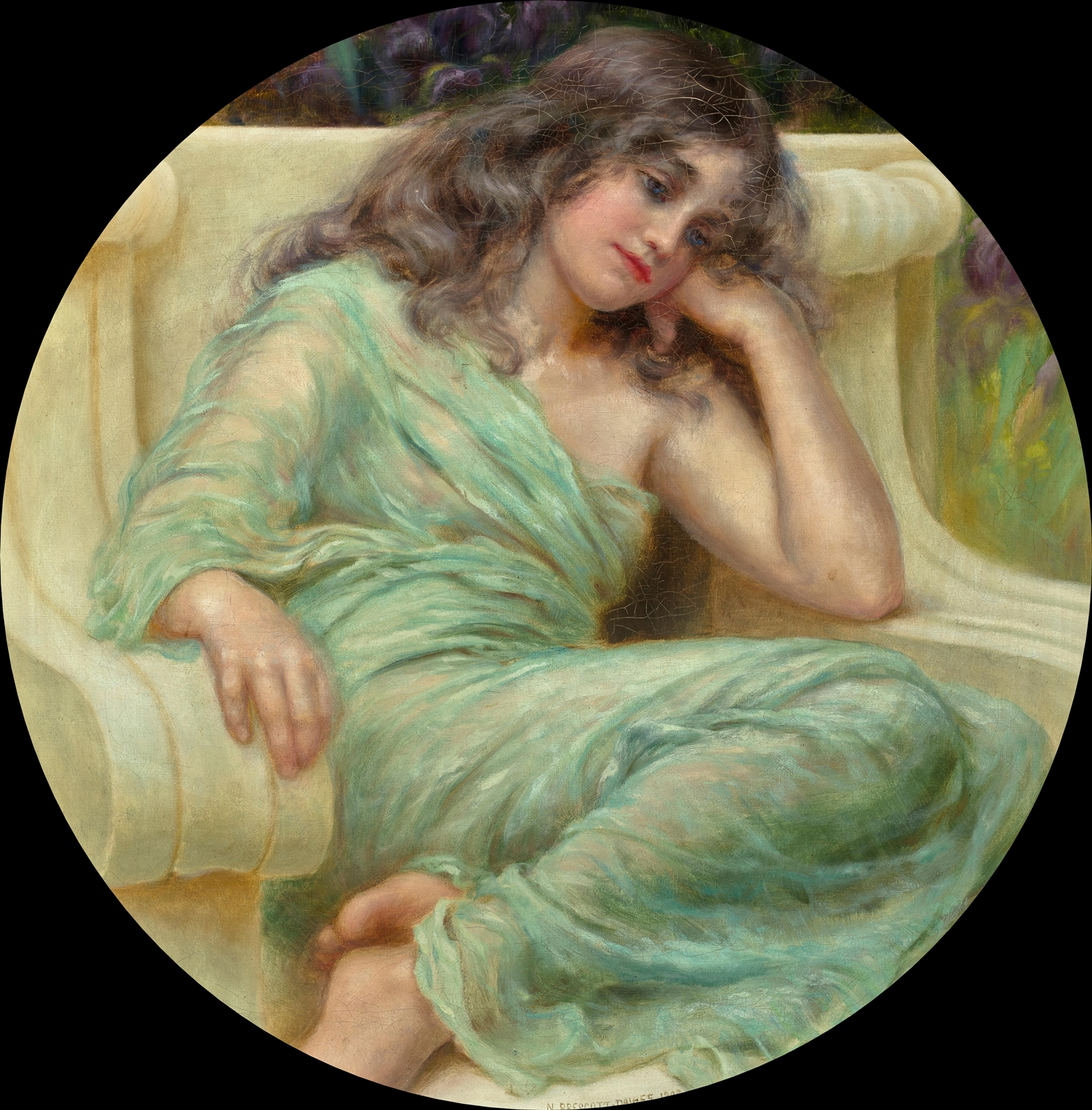

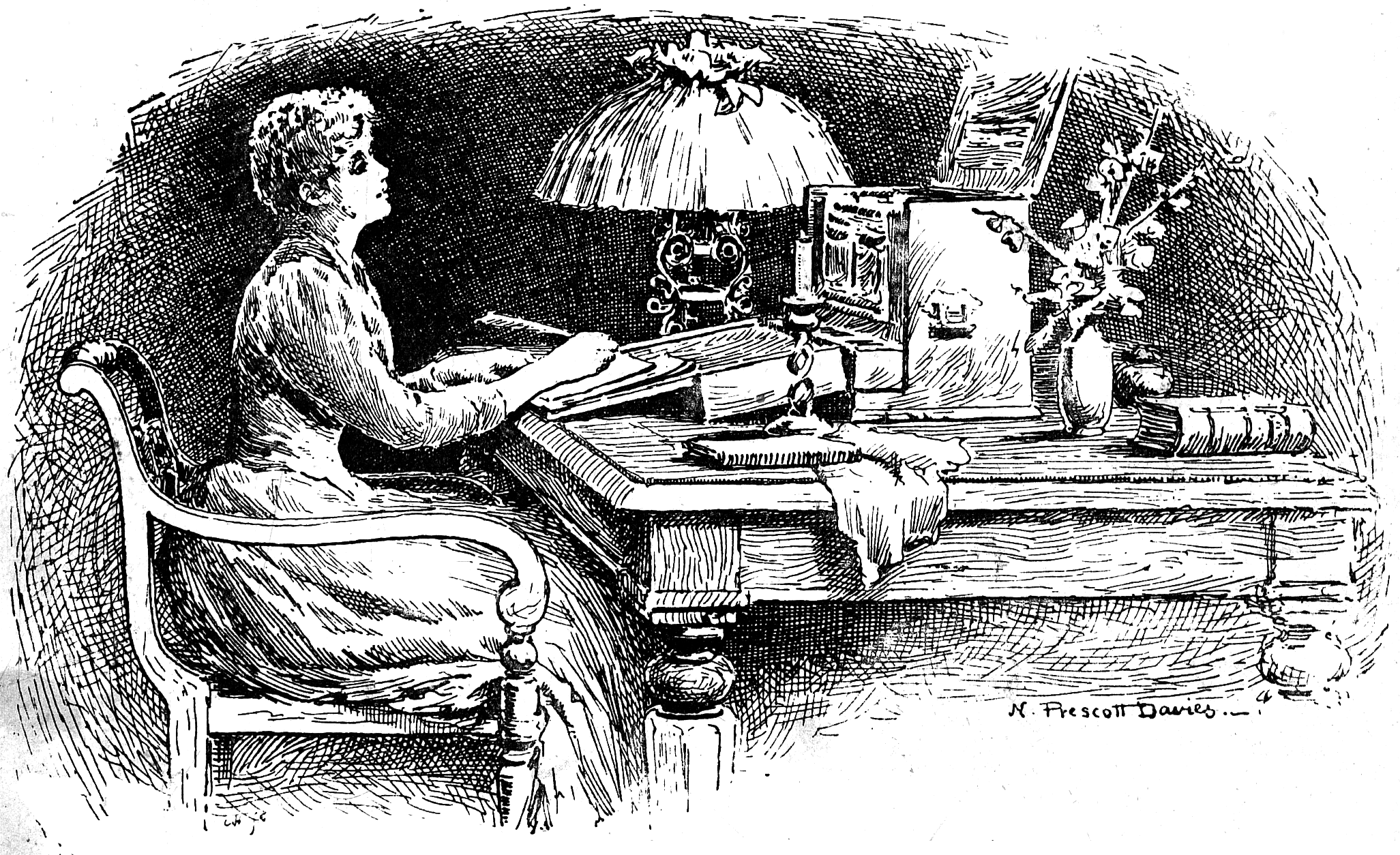
Norman Prescott-Davies, illustration in the Strand Magazine from 1891
