= Florence Lewis =

Mathematician and astronomer

Florence Parthenia Lewis (September 24, 1877 – March 10, 1964) was an American mathematician and astronomer.

== Early life and education ==
Born in Fort Scott, Kansas, Lewis attended the University of Texas for her undergraduate degree, which she received in 1897, and Radcliffe College for a master's degree, which she received in 1906. She earned her Ph.D. at Johns Hopkins University in astronomy and mathematics.

== Career and research ==
Lewis was a professor at Goucher College for her entire teaching career, from 1908 when she was appointed as an instructor to 1938 when she retired as an emeritus professor. She was known for her studies of geometrical interpretation of algebraic invariants.

== Honors and awards ==
A longtime member of the American Mathematical Society, she served on its council from 1919 to 1922. She was also a member of the American Astronomical Society and the Astronomical Society of the Pacific.
