= Anna Maria Carew =

English miniature painter (fl. 1660s)

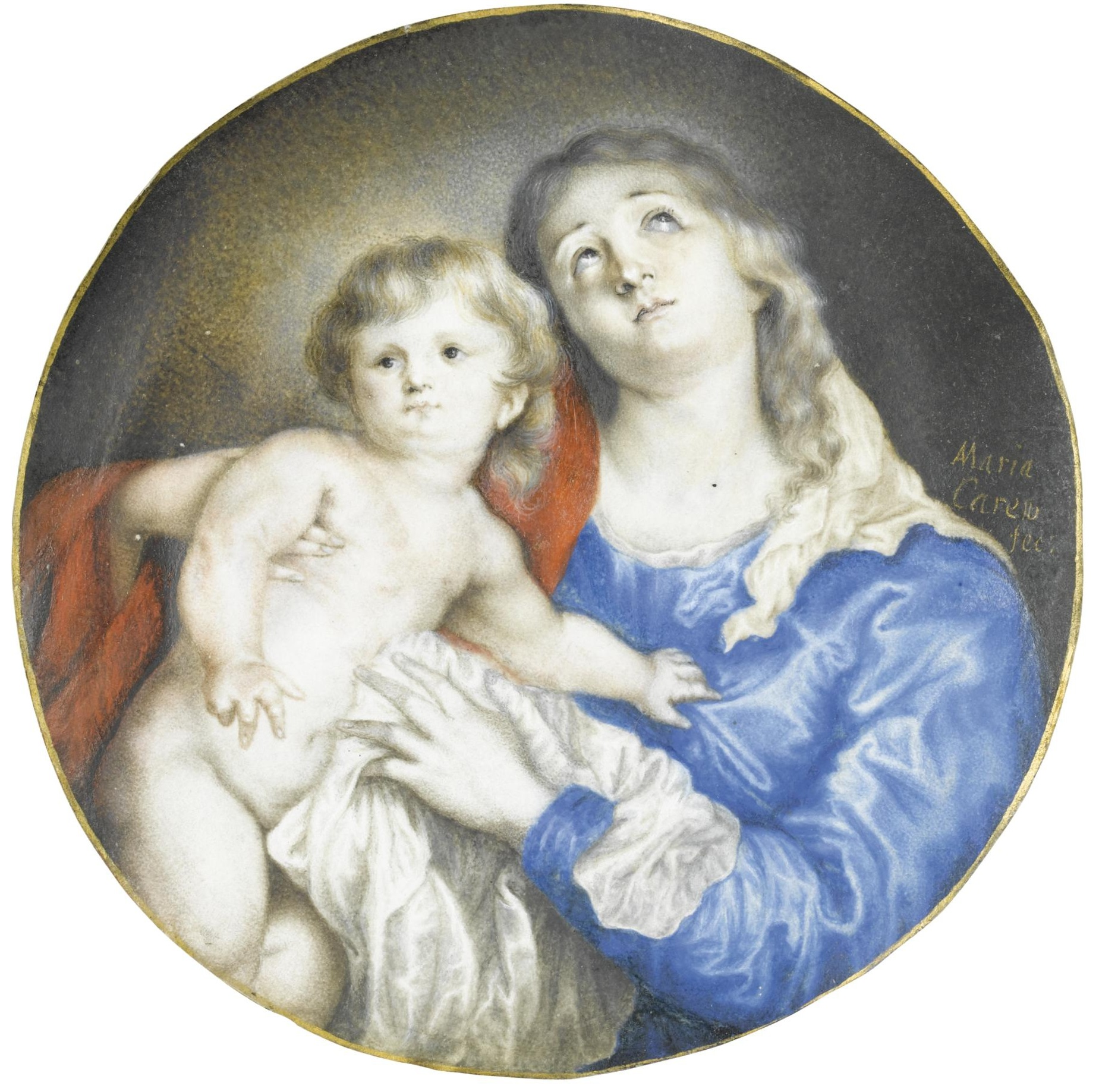
Madonna and Child by Carew c. 1662

Anna Maria Carew (fl. 1660s) was an English miniature painter.

== Biography ==
Carew is documented as having received a pension of 100 pounds for "copying the king's pictures in miniature" from Charles II of England after the Restoration in 1662. The pension was raised to 200 pounds 10 days later. Though she was paid for miniature copies of portraits, no known works survive in the Royal Collection.

Carew's works follow the style of the popular court miniature painter, Samuel Cooper. She was probably related to the artist Richard Carew.
