= Alice Elfrida Manly =

English painter (1846 – 1932)

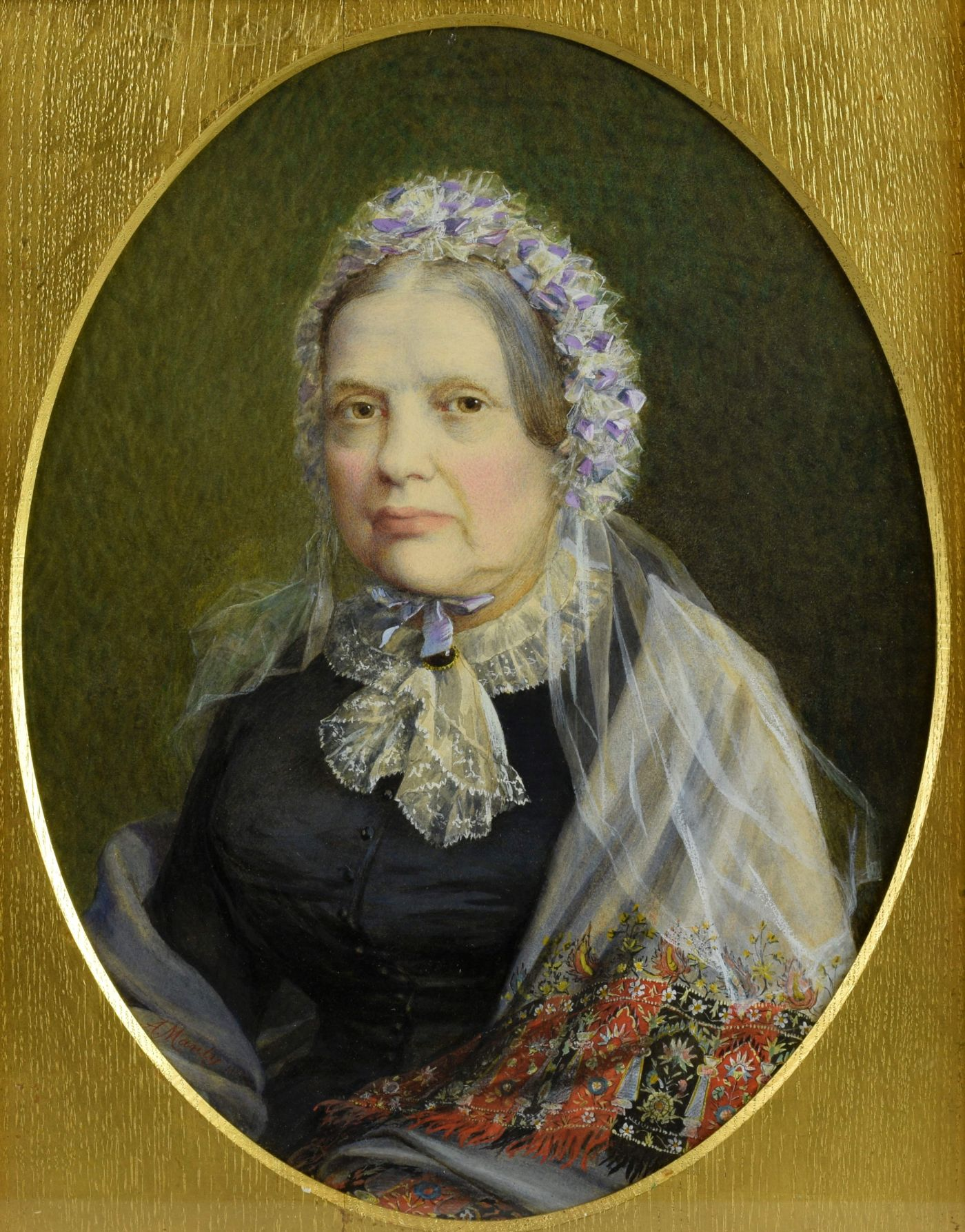
Portrait of Augusta Craven by Alice Manly

Alice Elfrida Manly (1846–1932) was an English painter of flowers, figures, and landscapes who was one of the first women members of the Royal Academy.

== Life ==
Manly was born in London, the eldest daughter of Henry Manly, a teacher. She was trained first by her father and then entered the Female School of Art in 1862 at the age of 16. In 1865 she became a pupil-teacher at the Science and Art Department at South Kensington Schools.

In 1866 she won a national gold medal for a study of grapes and leaves. In 1887 she won the Queen’s gold medal of the Female School of Art for three groups of flowers, one of them being purchased by Queen Victoria.

She pursued figure painting while she was seeking election to the Royal Academy, where she was admitted in January 1869. She and her sister Eleanor Manly, a figure painter and fellow alumna of the Female School of Art who was admitted to the Royal Academy in April 1873, were among its first female members.

Manly exhibited at the Dudley Gallery, the Society of Women Artists (1868–87), the Society of British Artists (1872–82), and the Royal Academy (1875–1917). She also produced pictures for publication.

In the 1870s Manly turned to landscape painting and took up art teaching to secure her income after the death of her father. She continued exhibiting until she was in her seventies.
