= Emma Oliver =

British painter (1819-1885)

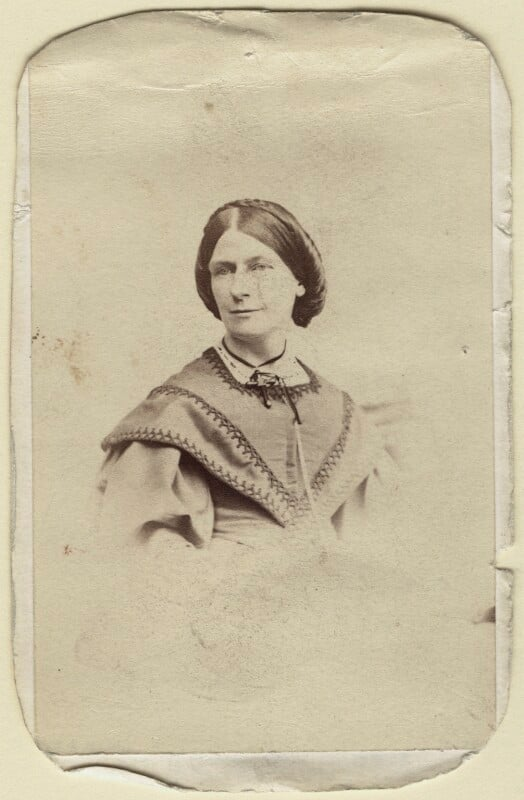
Oliver in the mid-late 1850s

Emma Sophia Oliver, later Emma Sedgewick (née Eburne; 15 August 1819 – 15 March 1885) was a British landscape painter.

== Biography ==
Oliver was born in London, being the daughter of Mary and William Eburne, a coach-builder from Rathbone Place. In September 1840 she married the painter William Oliver and the couple regularly took painting tours of Britain and Germany. Emma Oliver exhibited watercolours and oil paintings from these tours at the Royal Academy in London, at the British Institution and with the Society of British Artists. In 1849 she was elected a member of the Society of Painters in Water Colours. William Oliver died in 1853 and his widow remarried in, or around, 1856 a John Sedgewick but continued to exhibit works as Oliver until her death at Great Berkhamsted in 1885. Her later works included Rhine landscapes and scenes of Venice. The Victoria and Albert Museum in London holds examples of her work.
