= Benjamin Clayton III =

Irish artist

- Born: 6 January 1809; Dublin, Ireland
- Died: 11 August 1883 (aged 74); London
- Family: Benjamin Clayton II (father); Benjamin Clayton I (grandfather); Caroline Millard (sister); Ellen Creathorne Clayton (daughter)

Benjamin Clayton III (6 January 1809 – 11 August 1883) was an Irish wood engraver and miniature painter.

== Life ==
Benjamin Clayton III was born in Dublin on 6 January 1809. His parents were Benjamin Clayton II, a wood engraver, and Eleanor Creathorne. He had two younger brothers, and a sister, Caroline Millard. Clayton married Mary Graham in 1833. Both his sons, Albert Victor and Herbert Benjamin, became engravers, and his daughter, Eleanor, became an artist and writer. Clayton died of bronchitis and chronic rheumatism on 11 August 1883. He is buried at Nunhead.

He studied under his father, and later became a miniature painter. Between 1834 and 1841, Clayton exhibited with the Royal Hibernian Academy. In July 1841, Clayton moved to London with his family. In London he worked as an illustrator, as well as writing and illustrating guidebooks and children's books. He started his own weekly paper, Chat. His 12 part plate series entitled Costumes of the Grenadier Guards, from 1660 to 1853 was published by Ackermann in 1853-4. Clayton was among the founders of the Savage Club.
