= M'Clintock Bastion =

Mountain in Antarctica

M'Clintock Bastion (80°28′S 22°28′W) is a mountain rising to about 1,400 metres (4,600 ft) to the west of Mount Kelsey in the Pioneers Escarpment, Shackleton Range, Antarctica. It was photographed from the air by the U.S. Navy in 1967, and was surveyed by the British Antarctic Survey in the period 1968–71. In association with the names of pioneers of polar life and travel grouped in this area, it was named by the UK Antarctic Place-Names Committee in 1971 after Admiral Sir Francis Leopold McClintock, Royal Navy, a British Arctic explorer and pioneer in adopting Eskimo methods of overland travel; he took part in three Franklin search voyages, 1848–54, and commanded the Fox, 1857–59, on the voyage to Arctic Canada that finally determined the fate of Sir John Franklin's expedition.
