= Royal Academy Exhibition of 1860 =

1860 art exhibition in London

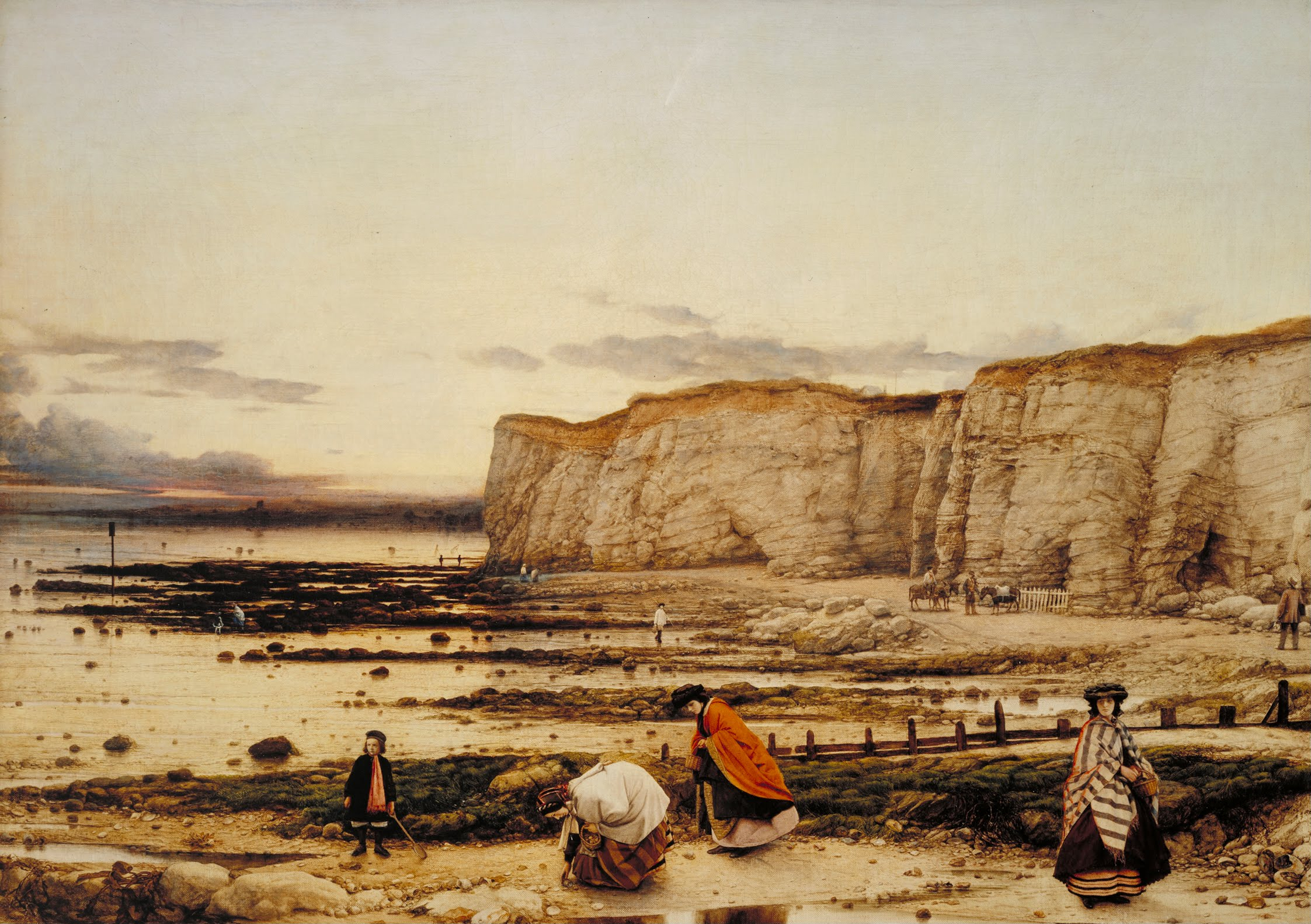
Pegwell Bay, Kent by William Dyce

The Royal Academy Exhibition of 1860 was the ninety second annual Summer Exhibition of the British Royal Academy of Arts. It was held at the National Gallery on Trafalgar Square in London between 7 May and 28 July 1860 during the Victorian era. William Dyce attracted attention with his three submissions including the landscape Pegwell Bay, Kent.

John Everett Millais's The Black Brunswicker depicted a scene from the Napoleonic Wars and was aimed to appeal to critic, art collectors and the general public. His fellow Pre-Raphaelite William Holman Hunt chose to exhibit his religious painting The Finding of the Saviour in the Temple in a private exhibition in Bond Street in direct competition with the Academy's show.

John Phillip displayed his royal commission The Marriage of Victoria, Princess Royal as well as Prayer, one of his Spanish-inspired paintings which was his diploma work on his election as a Royal Academician. George Elgar Hicks followed up his success at the previous year's exhibition Dividend Day at the Bank of England with a similar scene The General Post Office, One Minute to Six. William Powell Frith displayed the genre painting Claude Duval while Richard Ansdell 's Buy a Dog Ma'am? showed a scene of London life.

== Gallery ==
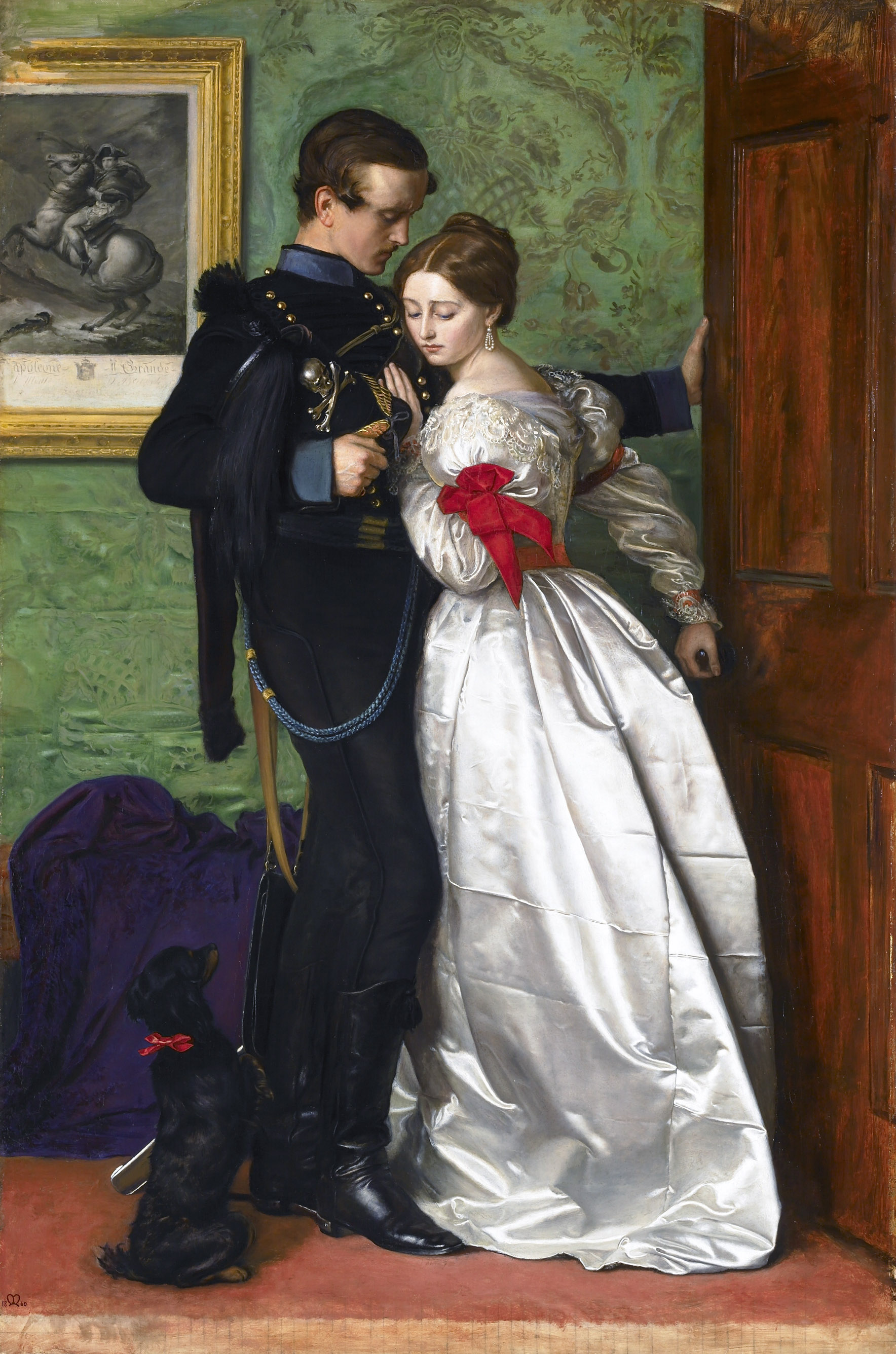
The Black Brunswicker by John Everett Millais

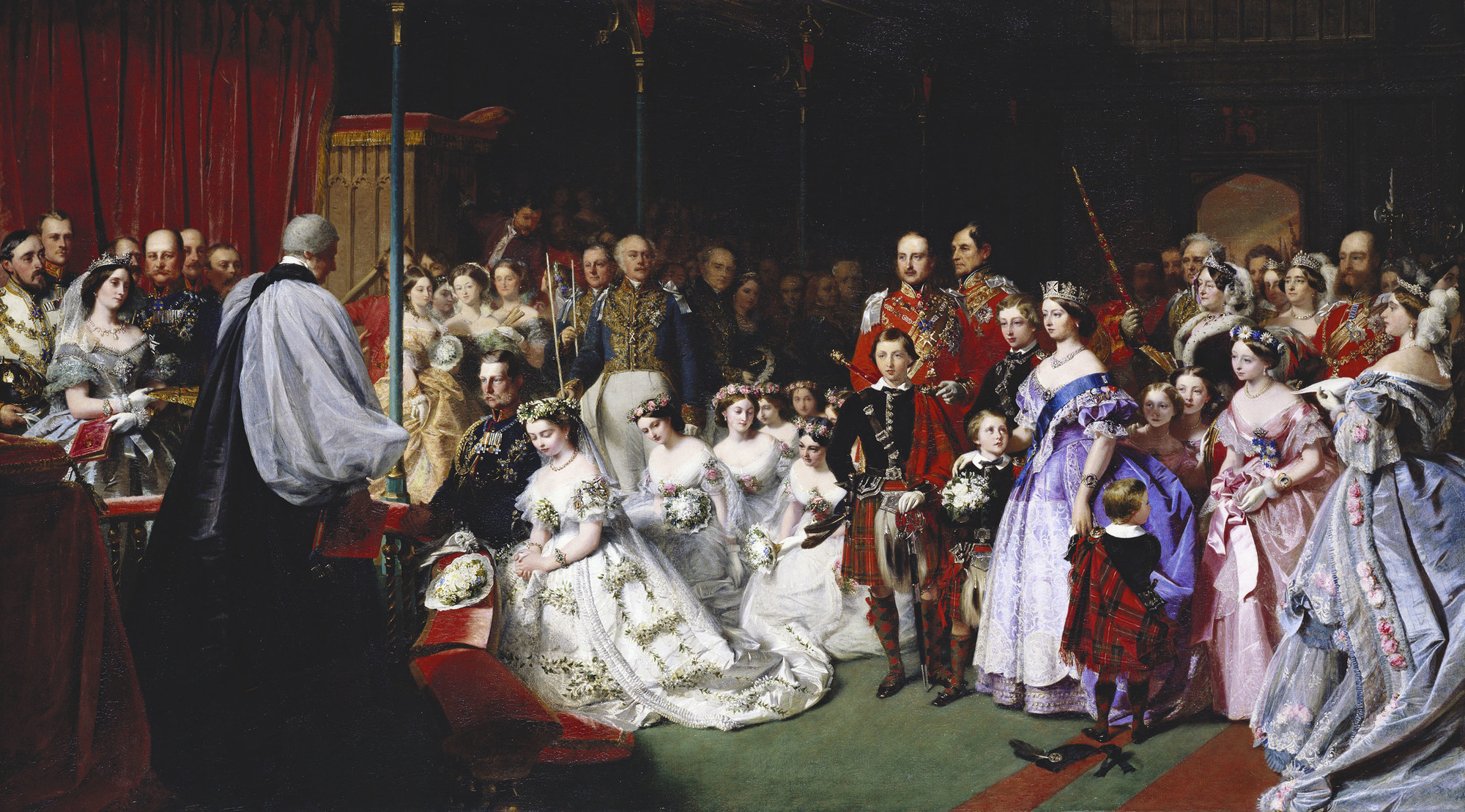
The Marriage of Victoria, Princess Royal by John Phillip

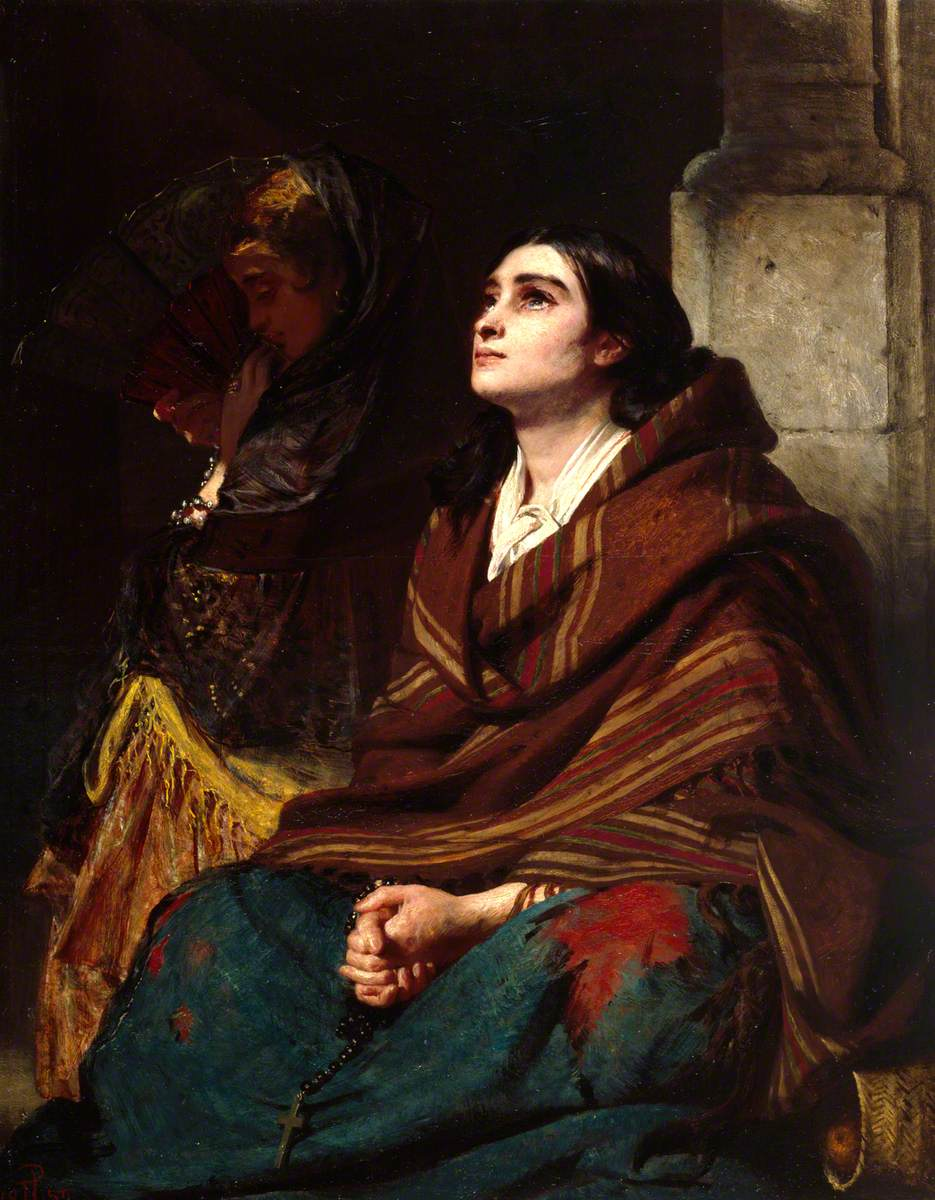
Prayer by John Phillip

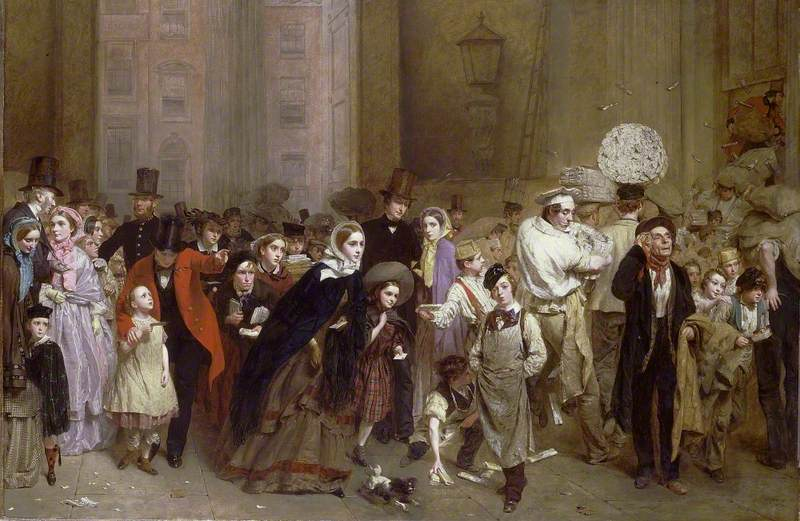
The General Post Office, One Minute to Six by George Elgar Hicks

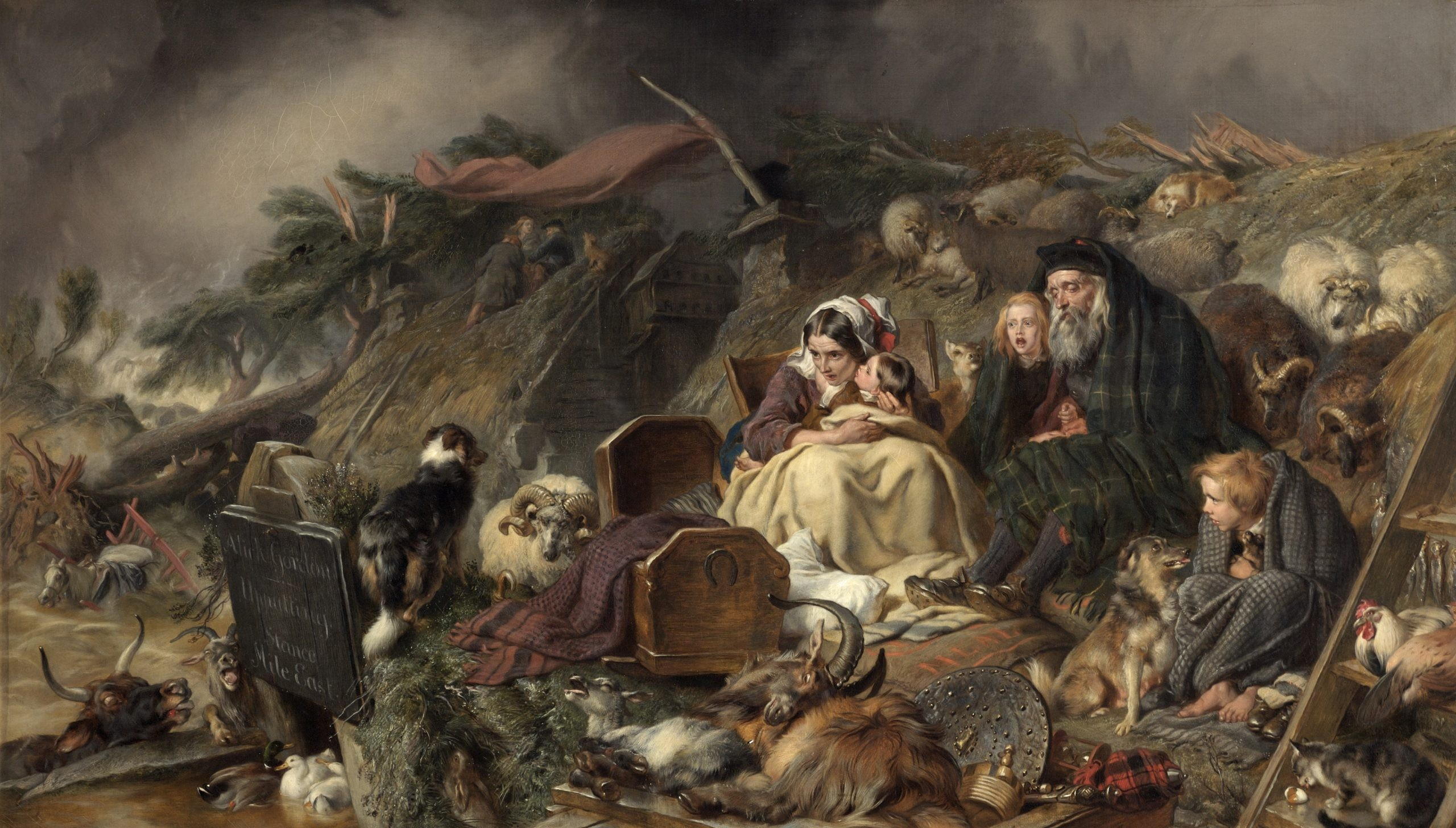
Flood in the Highlands by Edwin Landseer

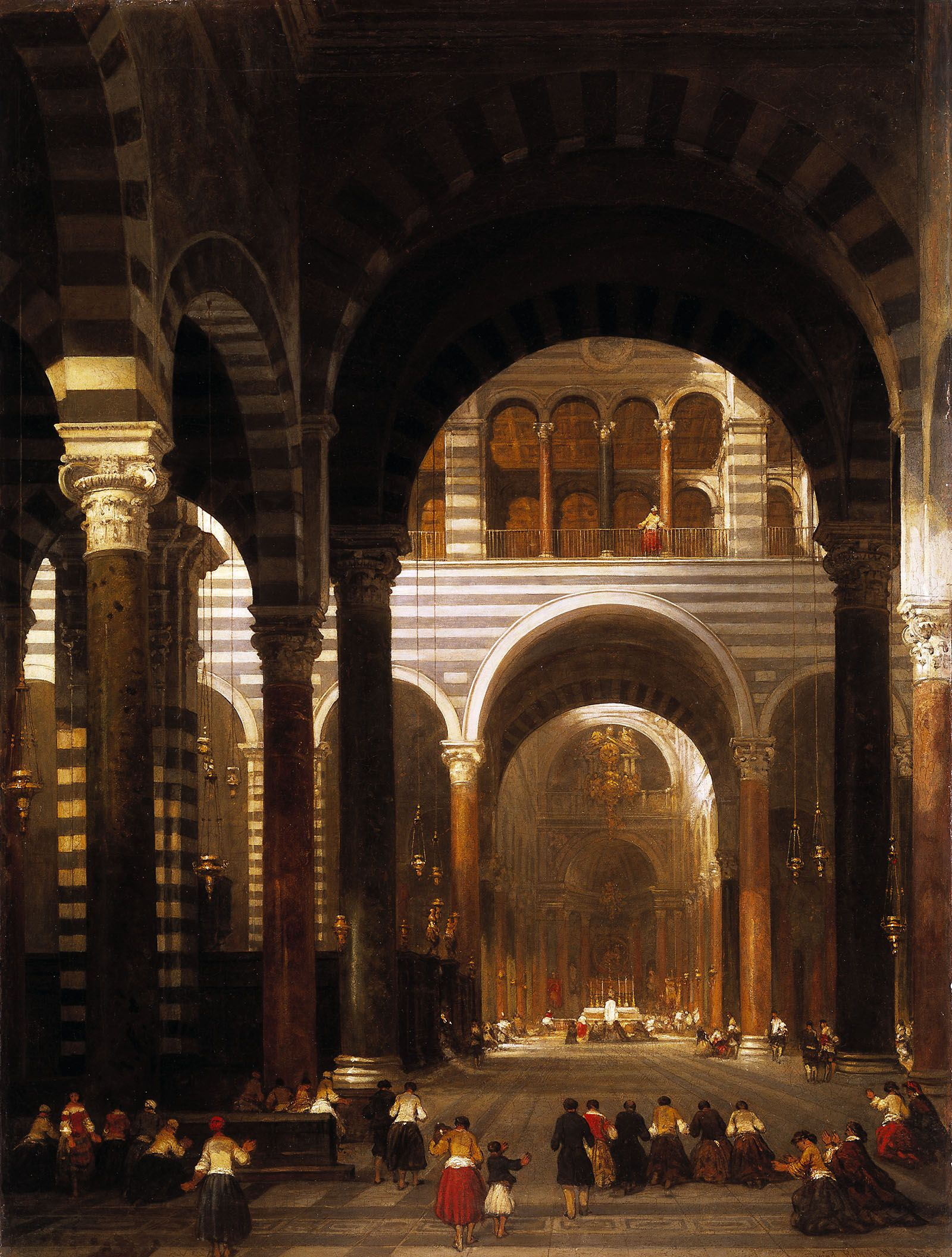
Interior of the Cathedral, Pisa by David Roberts

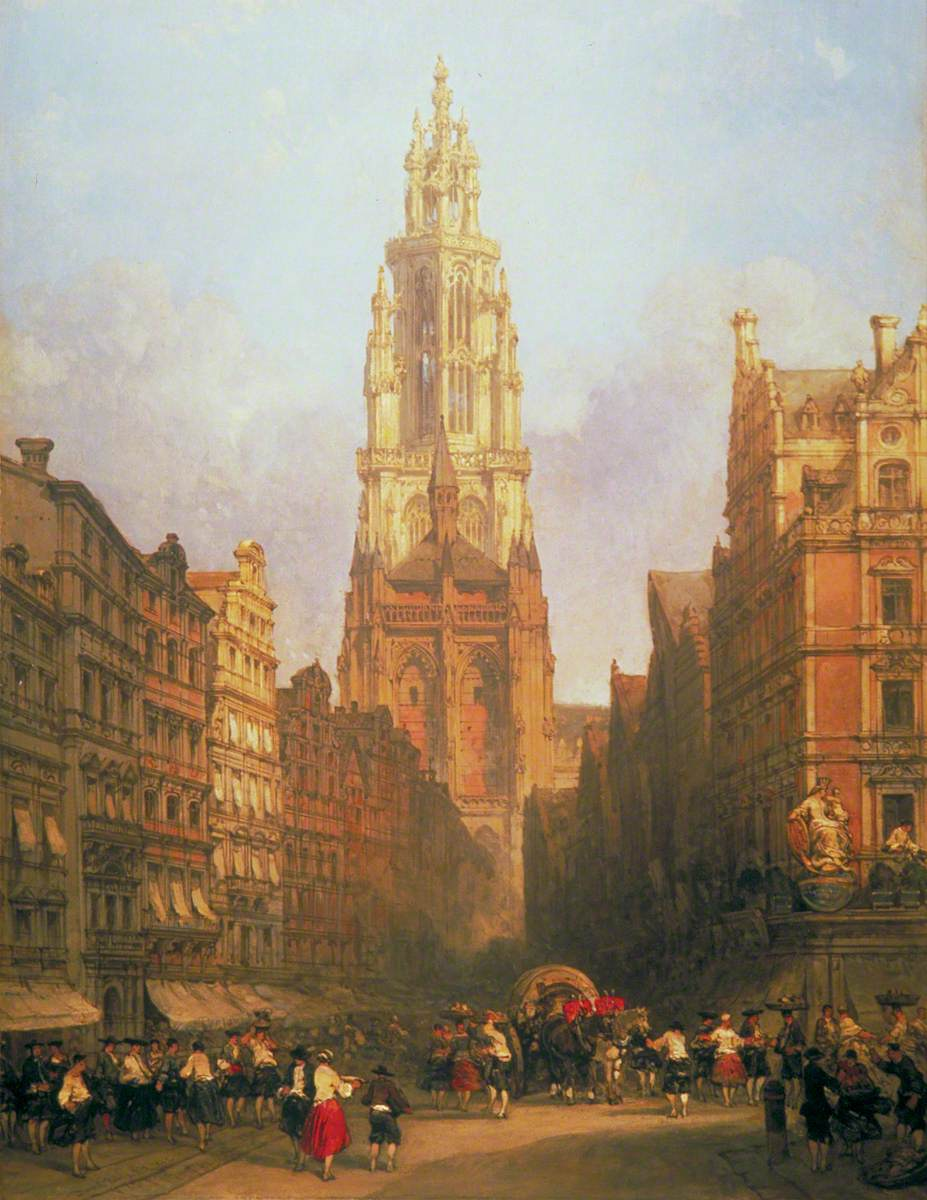
A Street in Antwerp by David Roberts

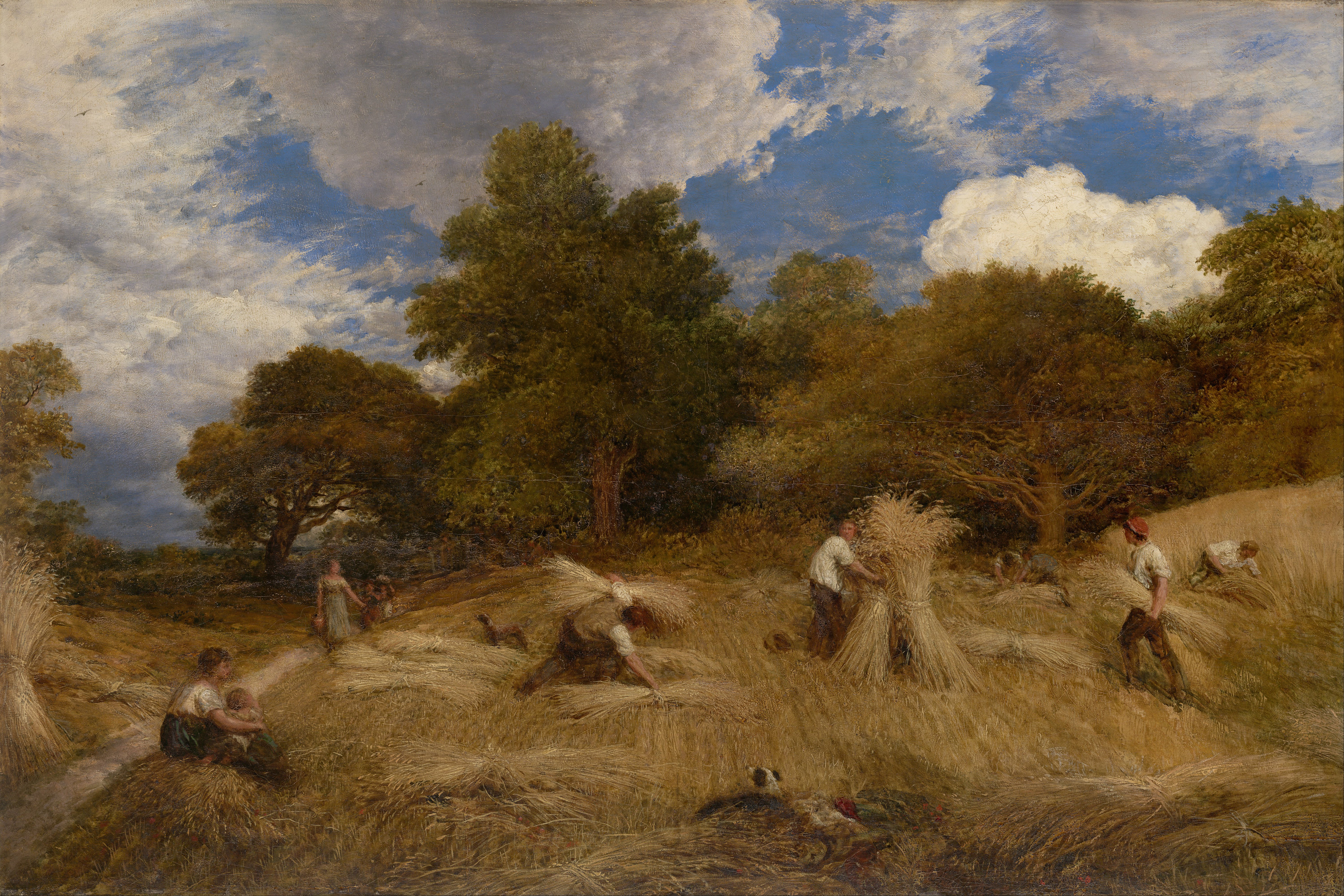
Wheat by John Linnell

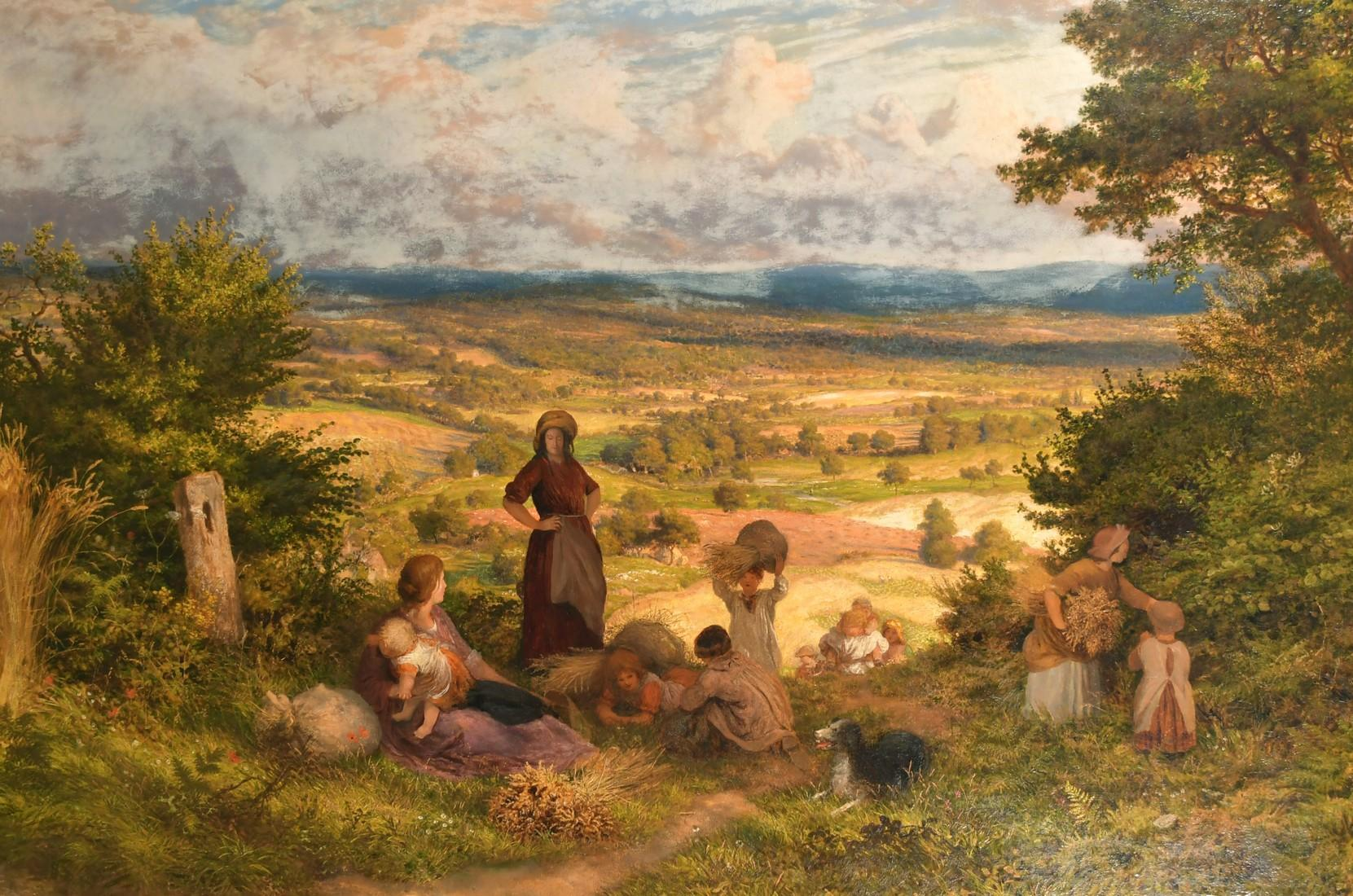
Atop of the Hill by John Linnell

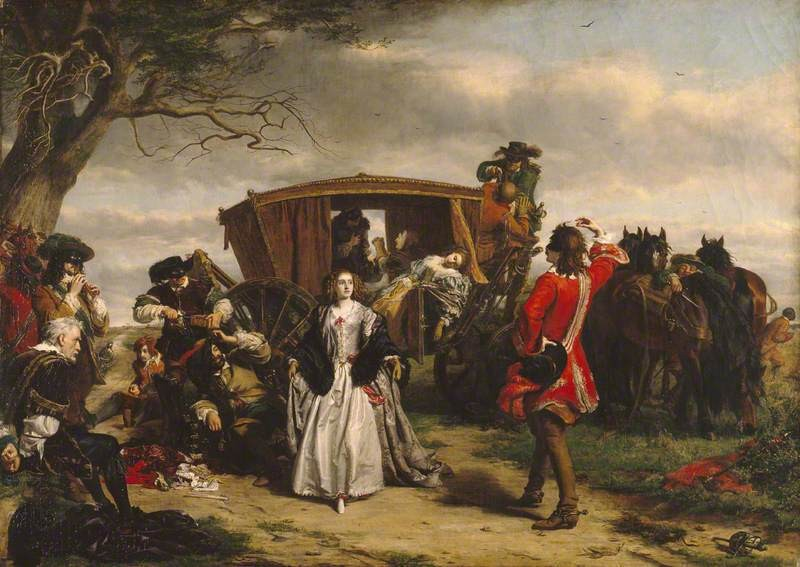
Claude Duval by William Powell Frith

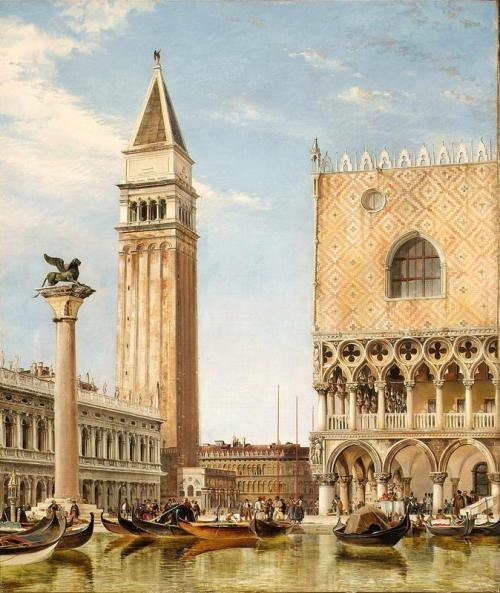
The Piazzetta, Venice by Edward William Cooke

Bella Venezia by Edward William Cooke

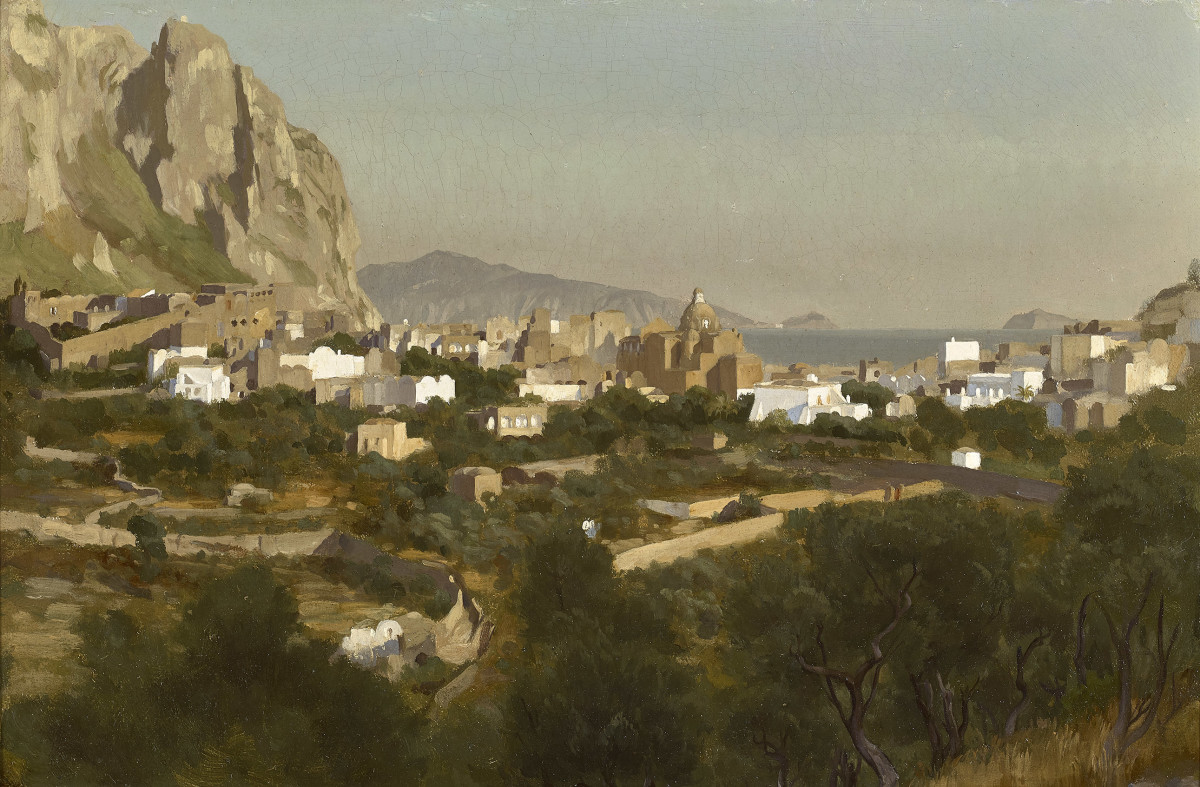
Capri, Sunrise by Frederic Leighton

The Hedger by John Brett

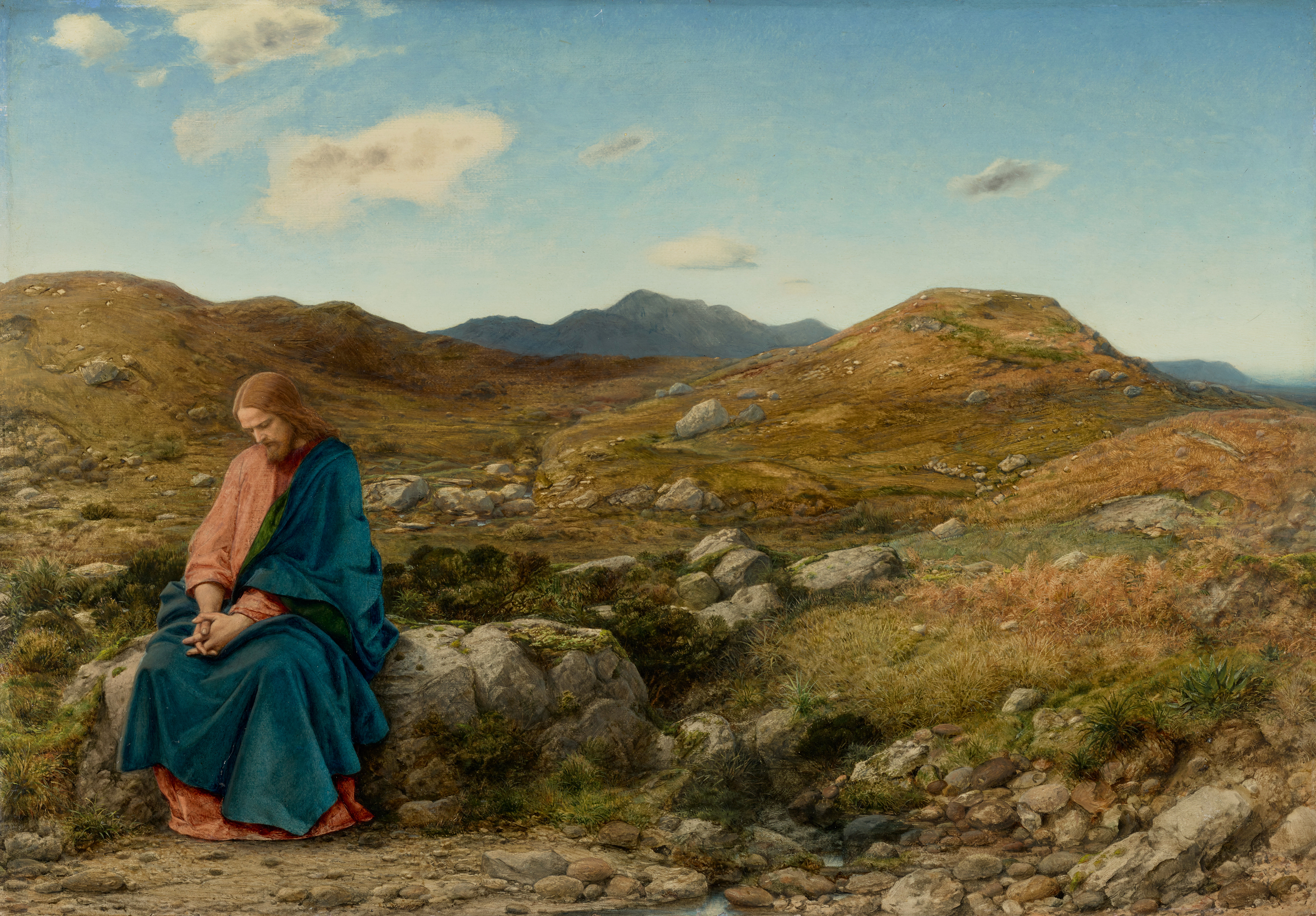
Man of Sorrows by William Dyce

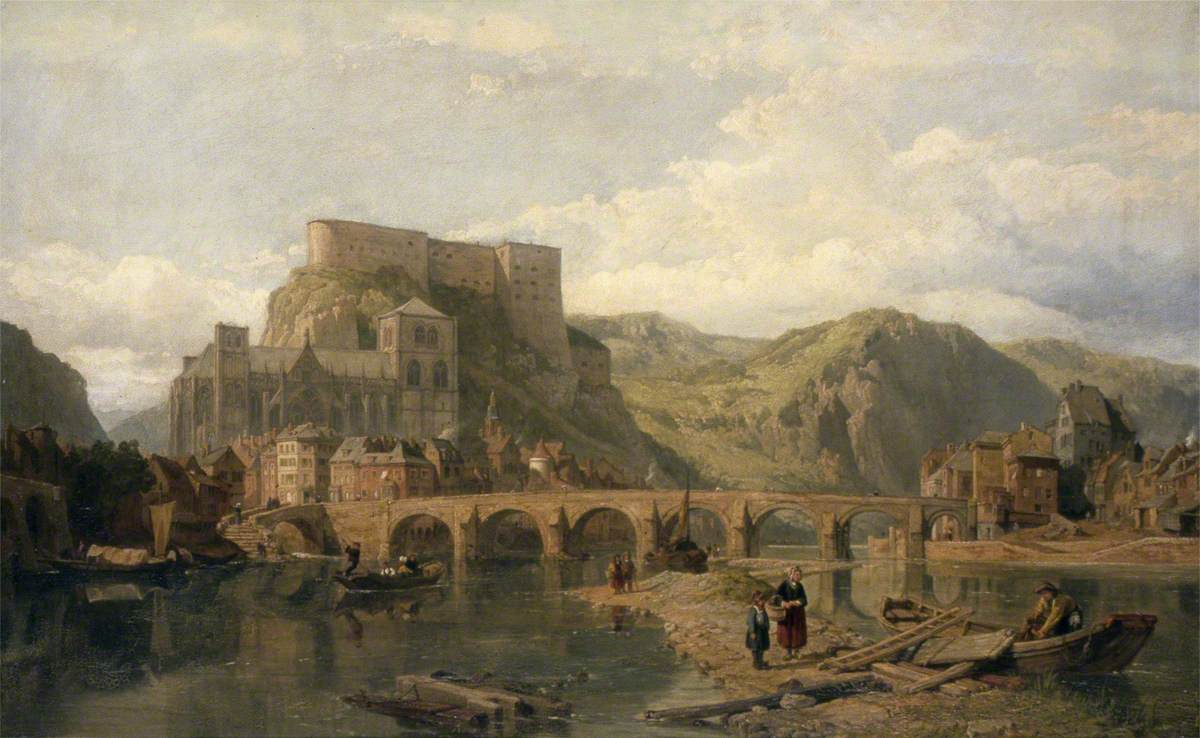
Huy on the Meuse by George Clarkson Stanfield

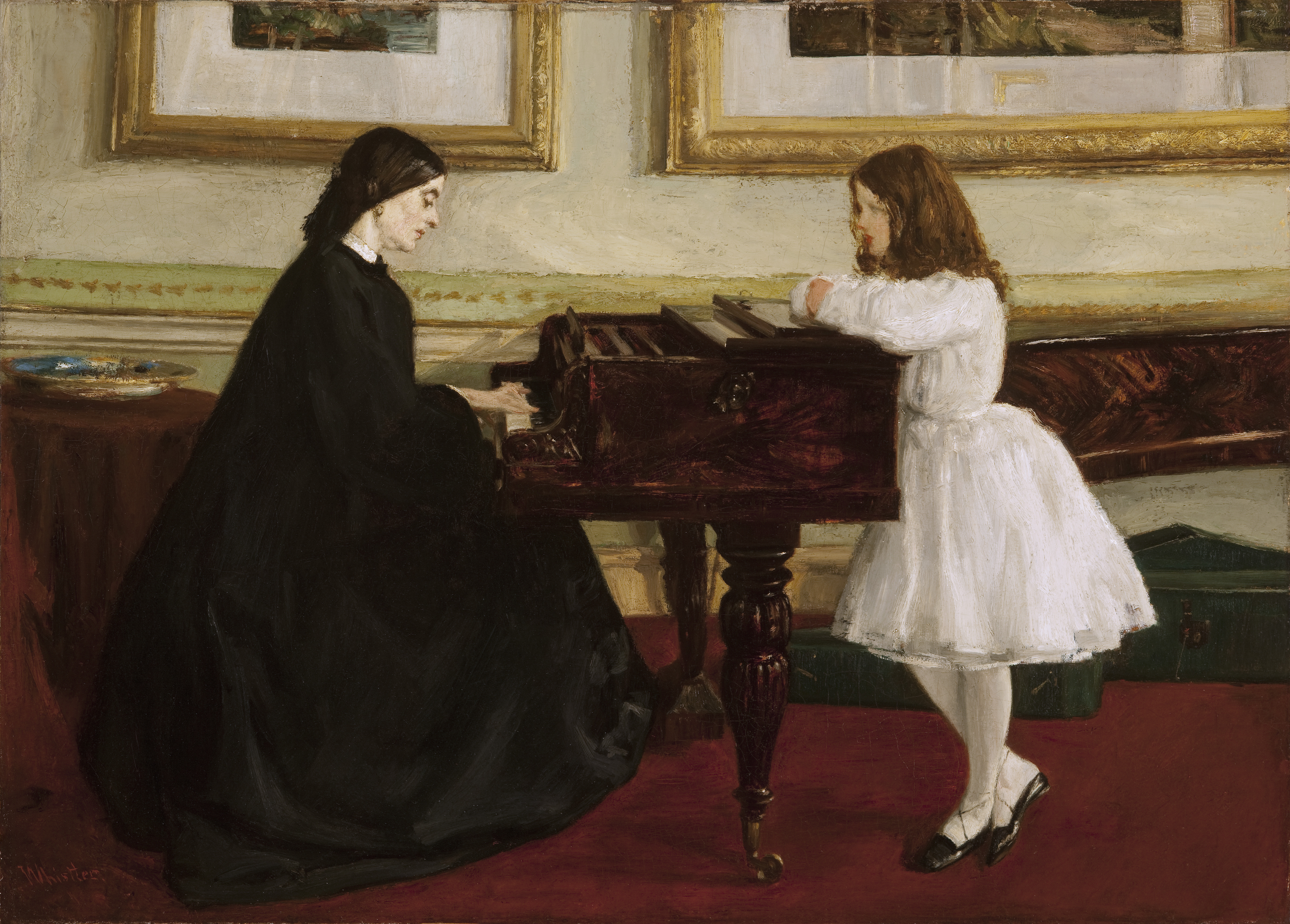
At the Piano by James McNeill Whistler

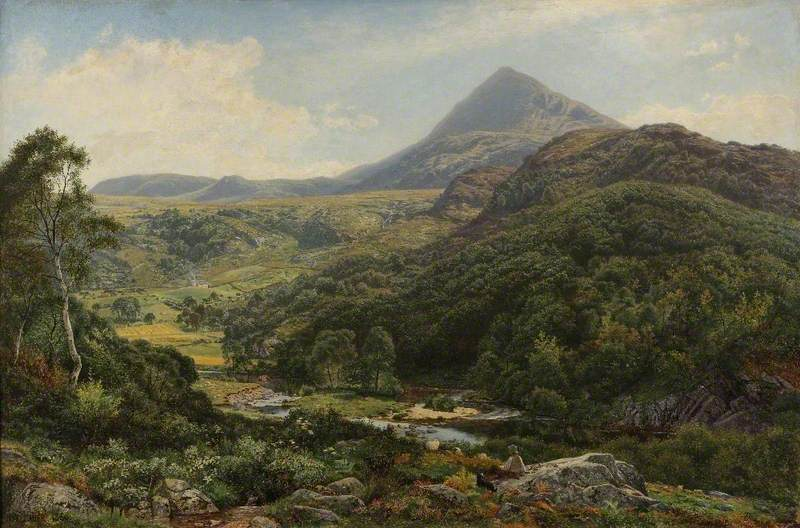
Quiet Valley Among the Welsh Hills by Benjamin Williams Leader

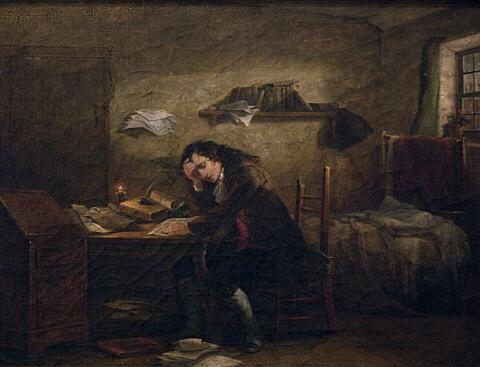
The Poet Chatterton by John Joseph Barker

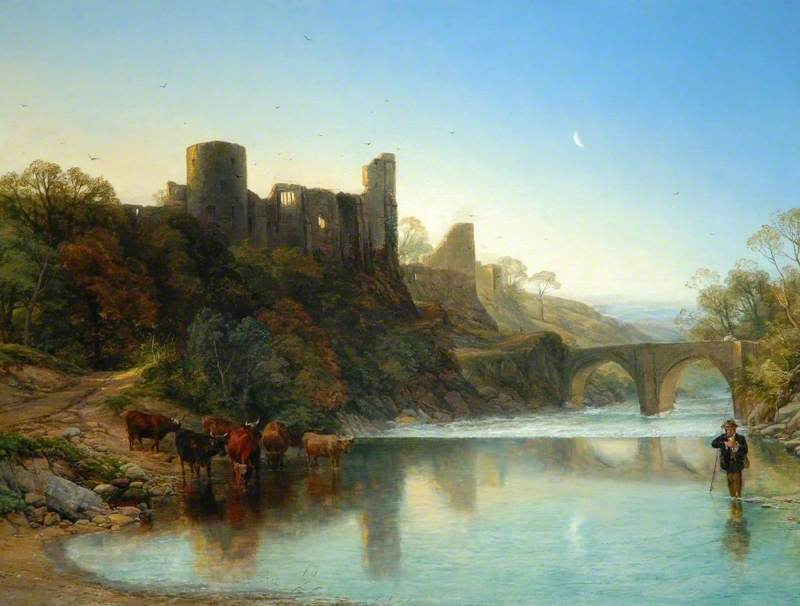
A Relic of Old Times by Thomas Creswick

Showing a Preference by John Calcott Horsley

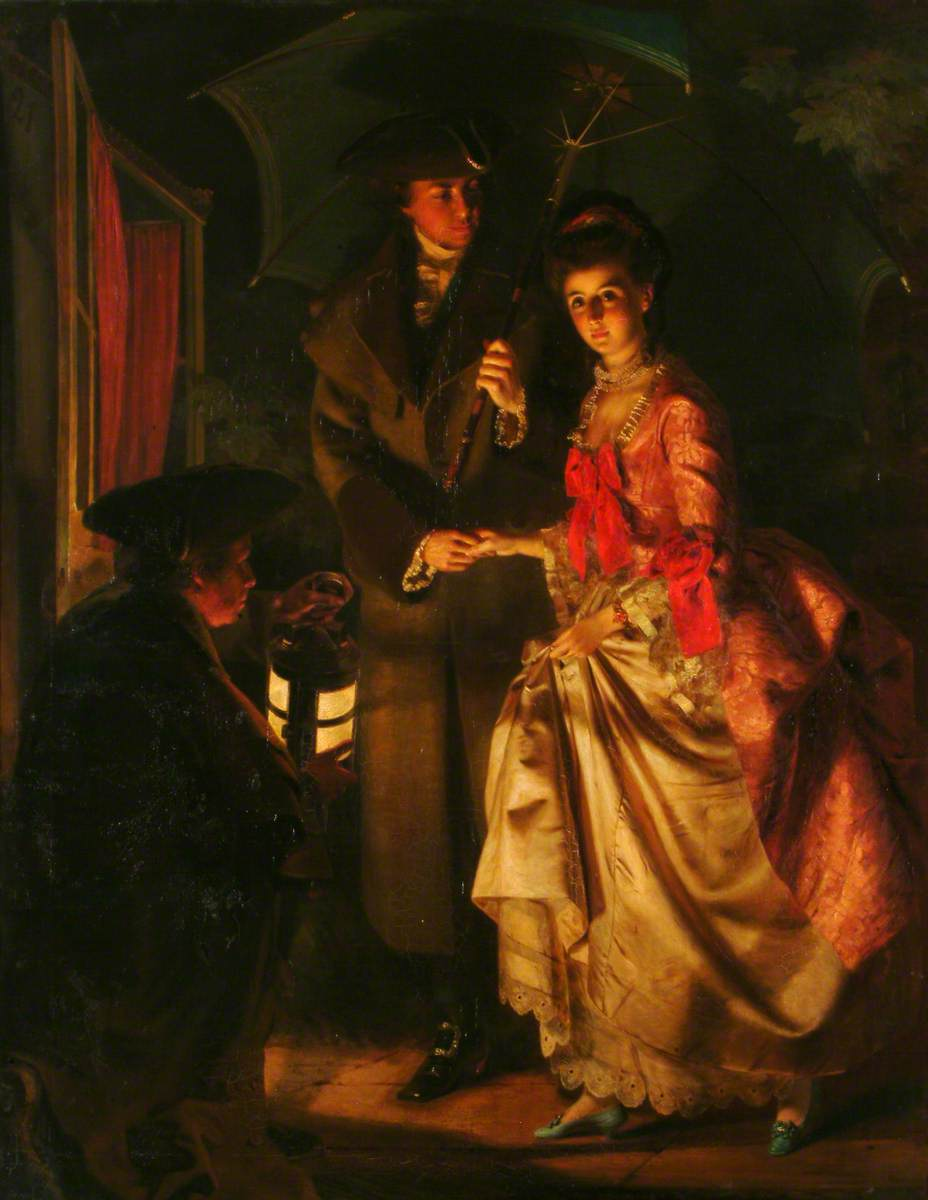
Sheridan Assisting Miss Linley on Her Flight from Bath by Jerry Barrett

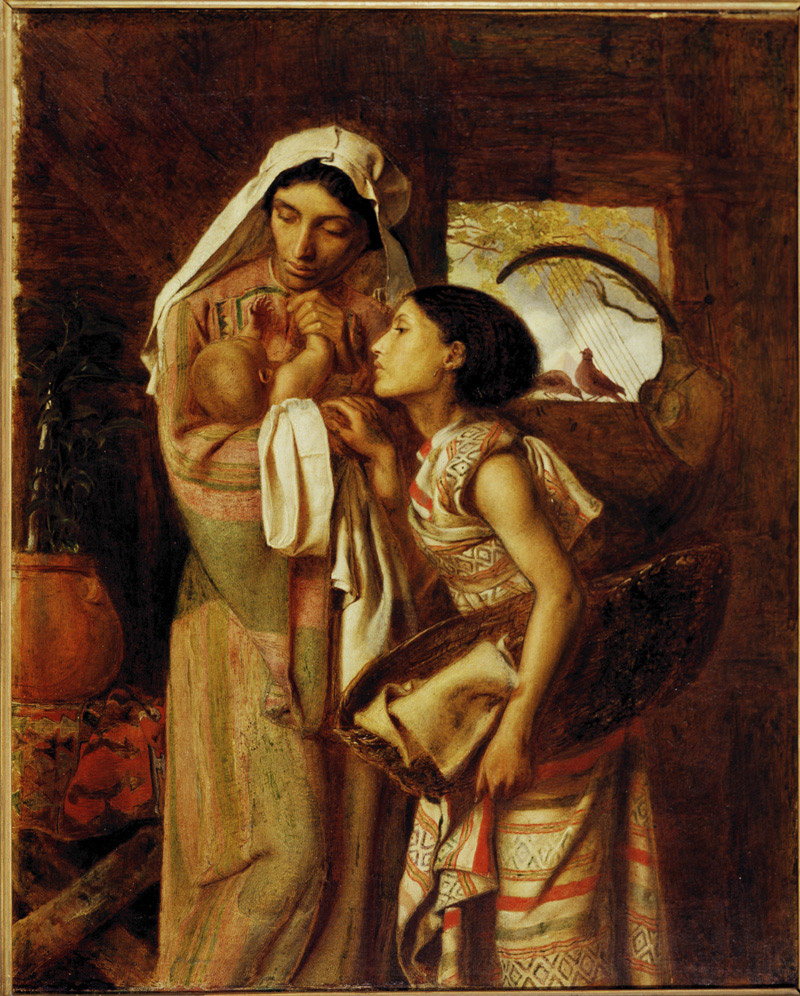
The Mother of Moses by Simeon Solomon

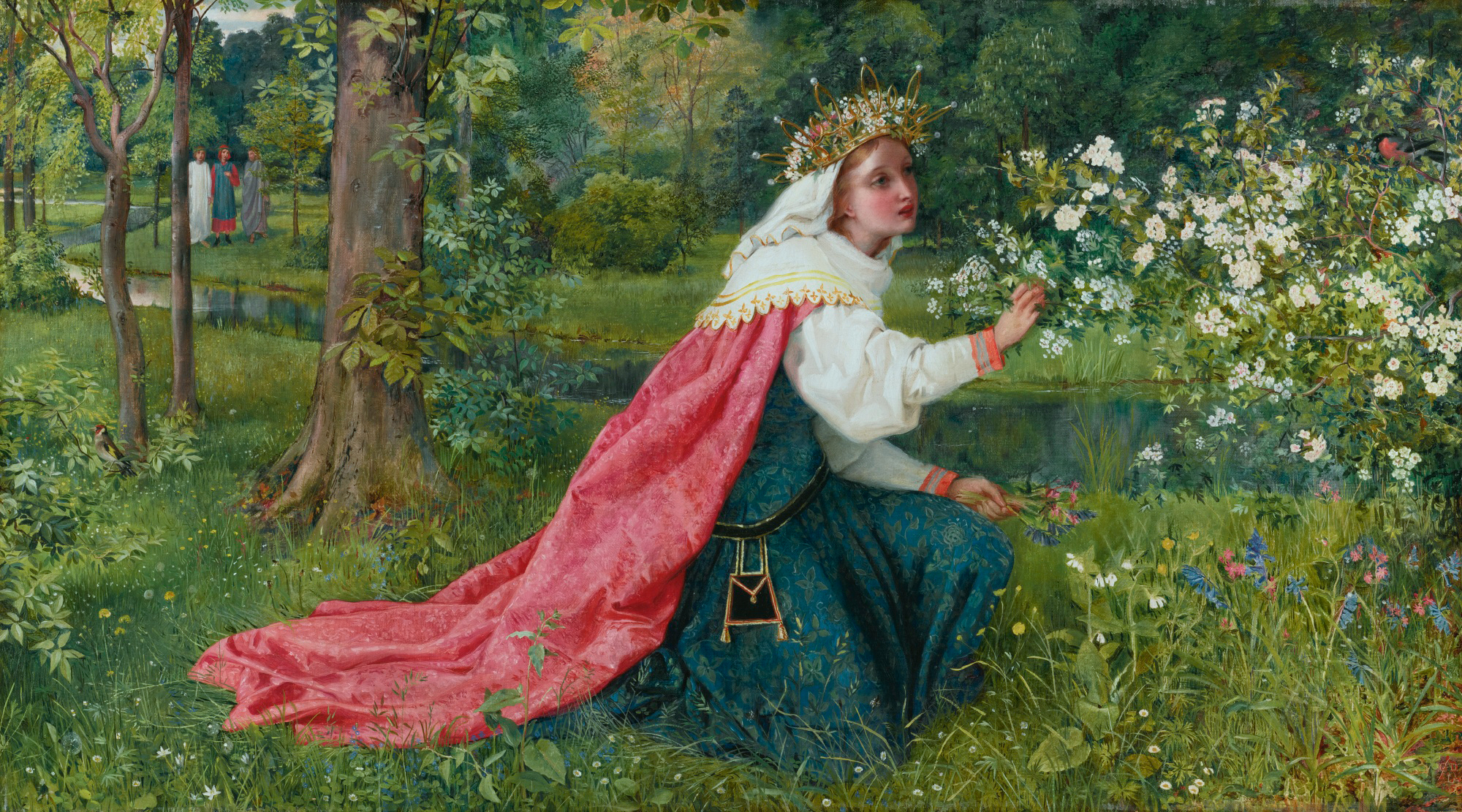
Matilda by George Dunlop Leslie

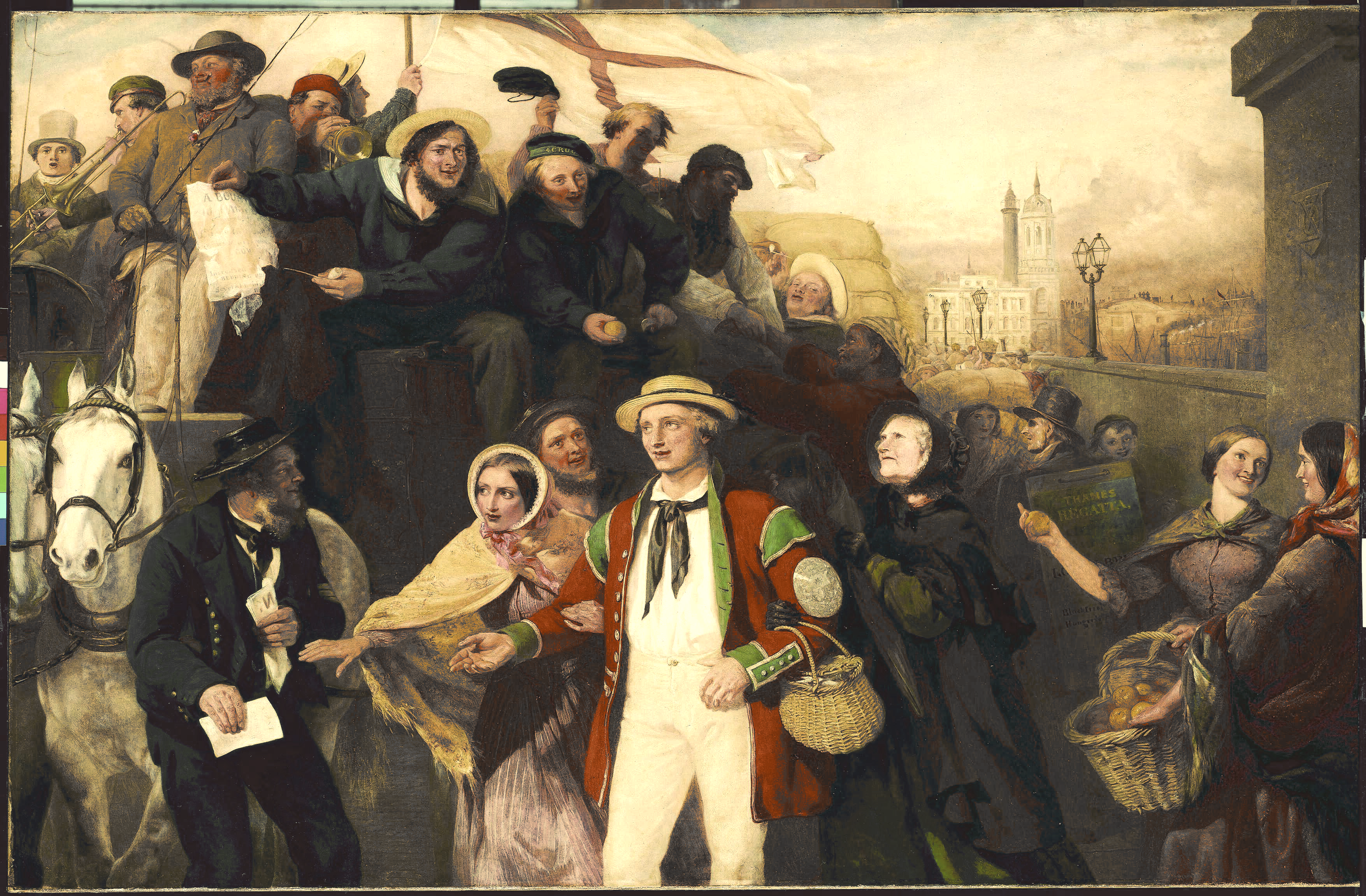
Manning the Navy by George Bernard O'Neill

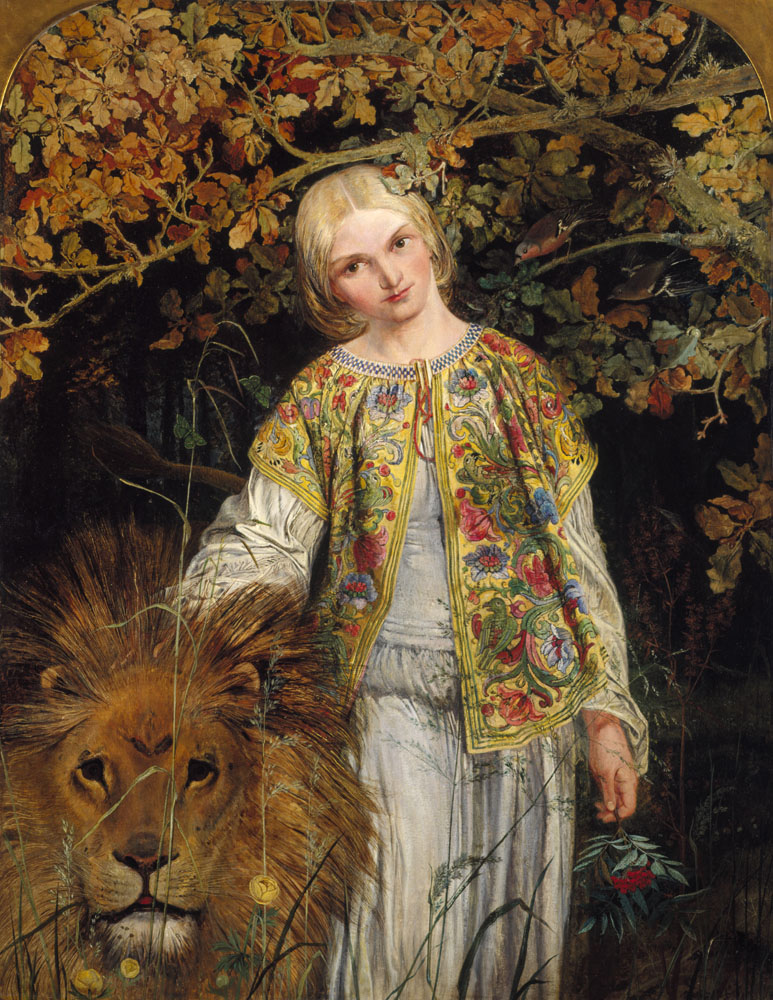
Una and the Lion by William Bell Scott

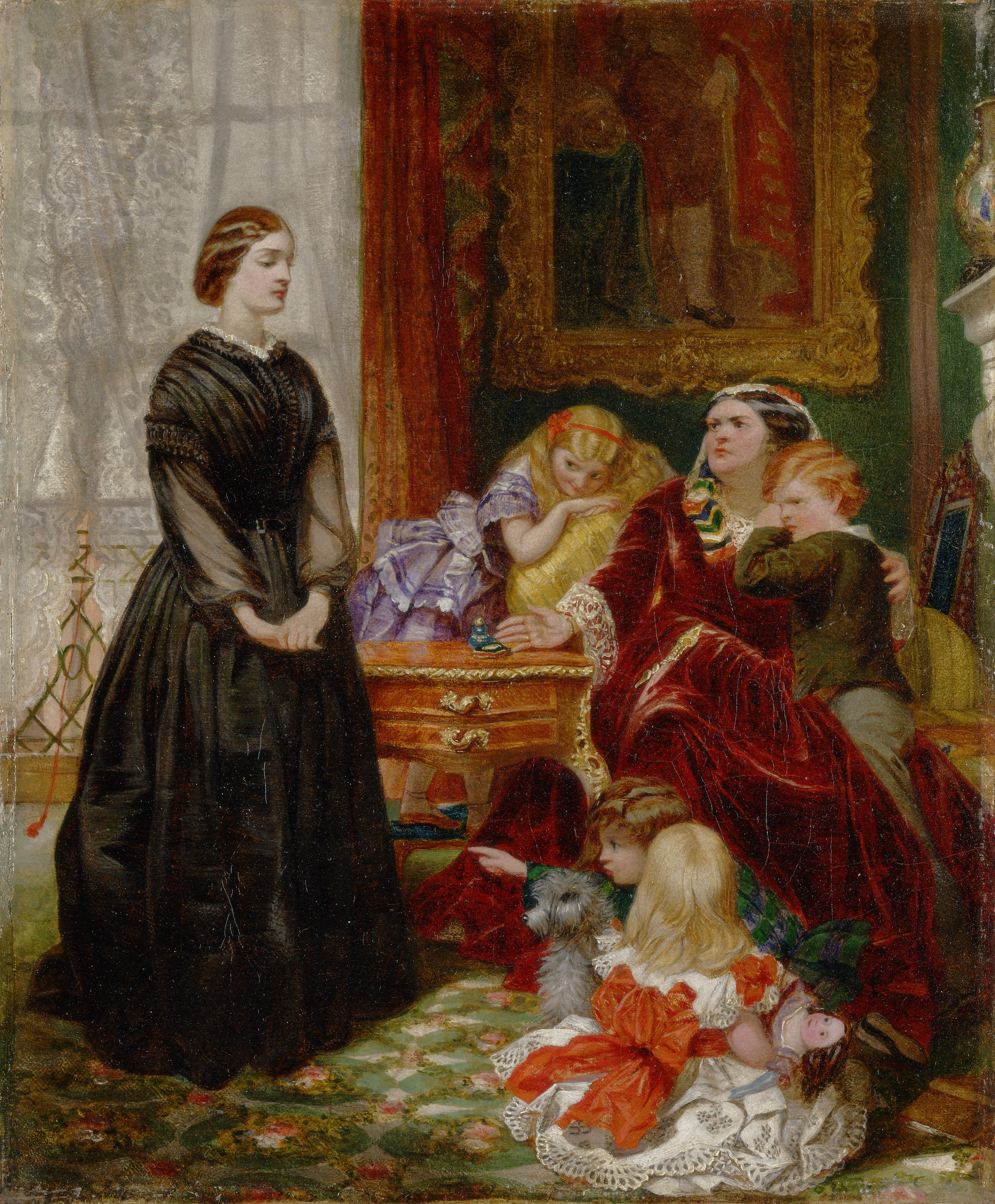
The Governess by Emily Mary Osborn

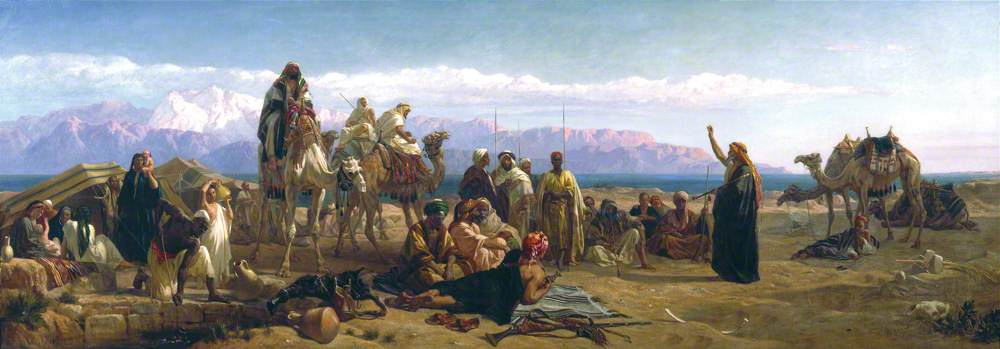
Early Morning in the Wilderness of Shur by Frederick Goodall

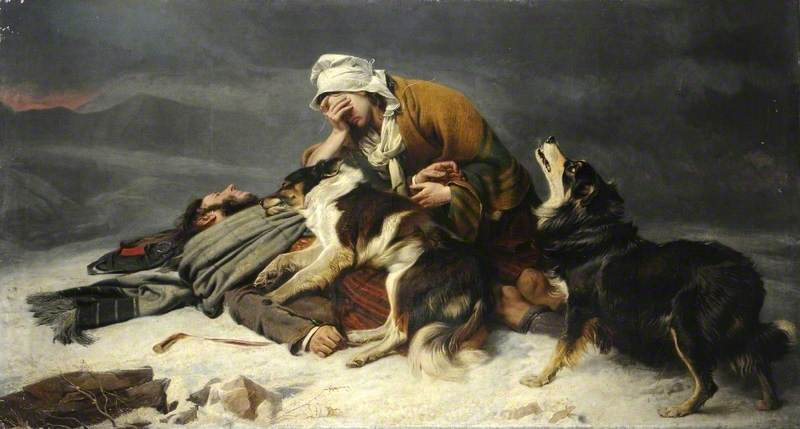
The Lost Shepherd by Richard Ansdell

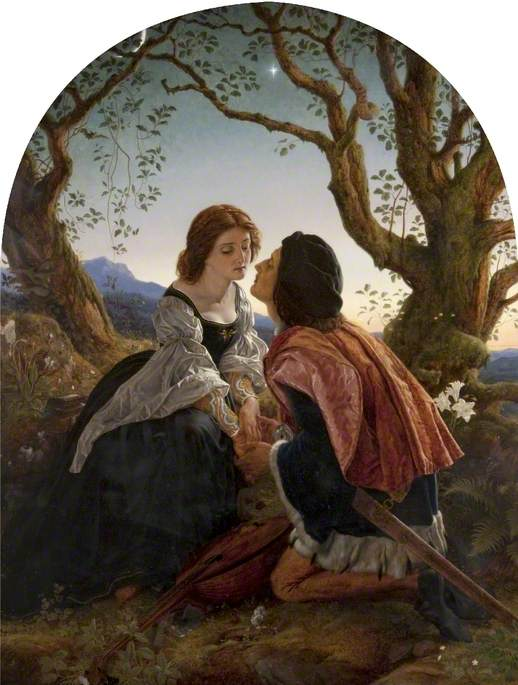
Hesperus by Joseph Noel Paton

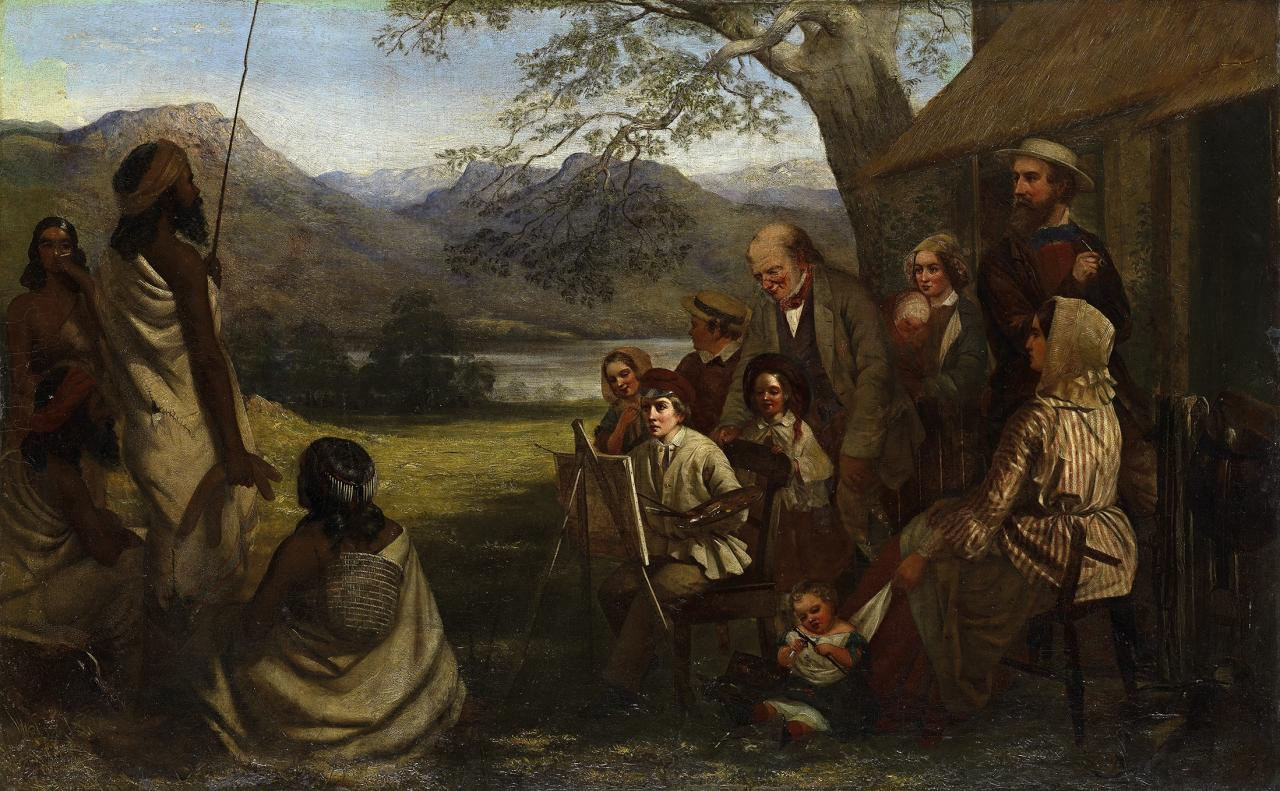
Early Effort by Robert Hawker Dowling

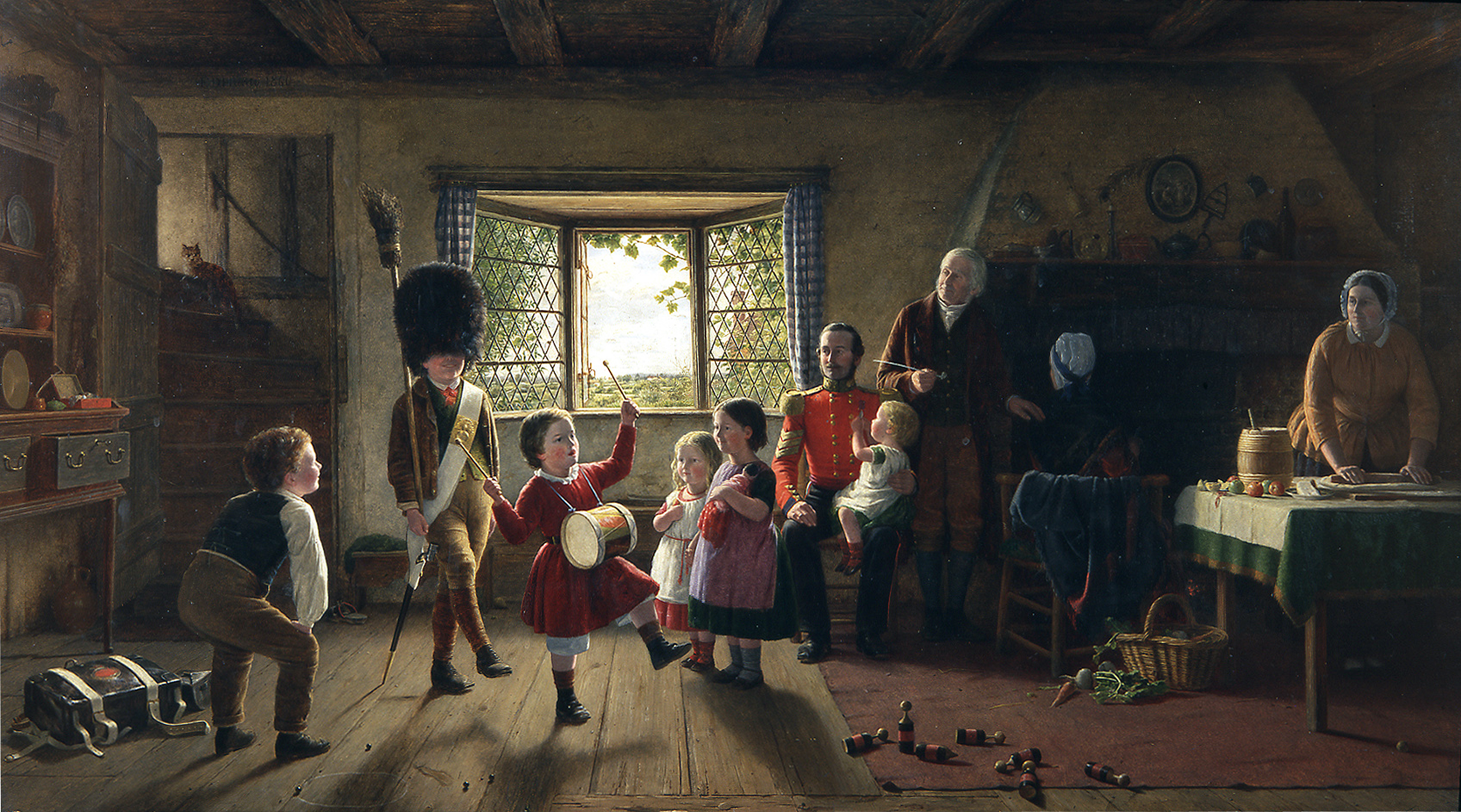
The Volunteers by Frederick Daniel Hardy

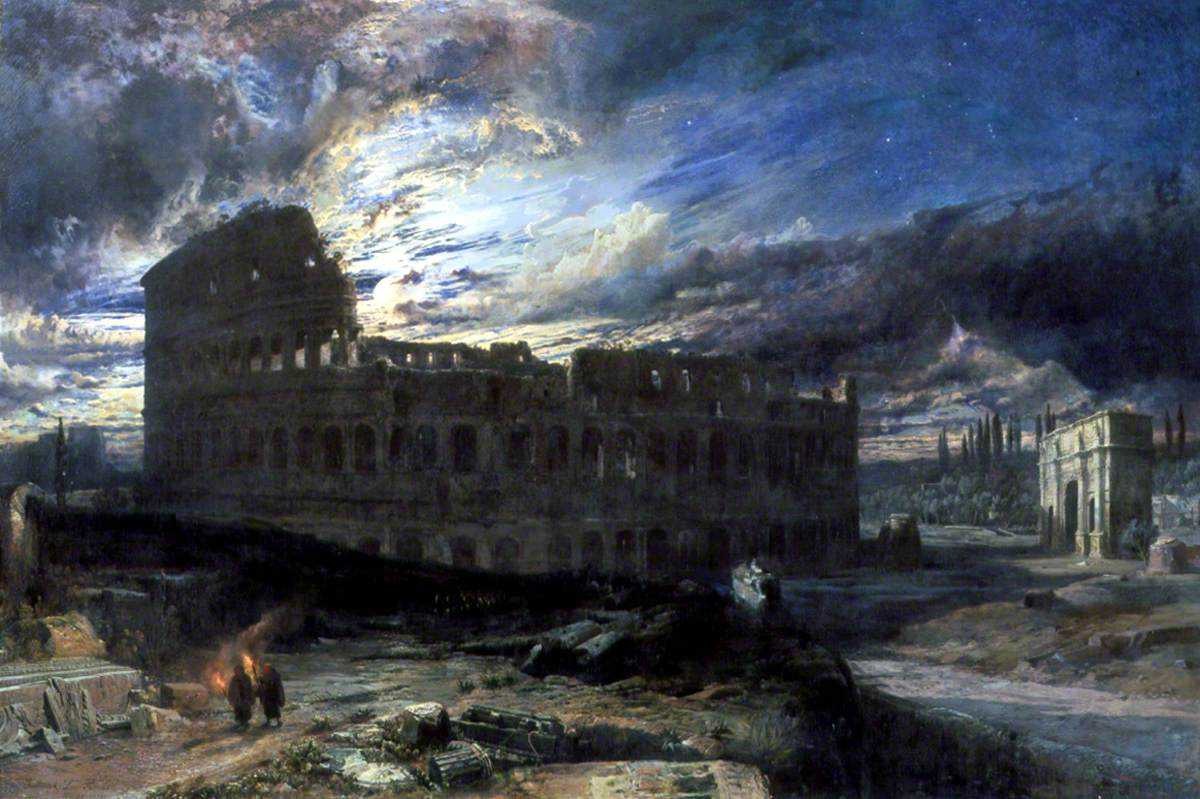
The Coliseum at Rome by Moonlight by Frederick Lee Bridell

A Volunteer by Henry Nelson O'Neil

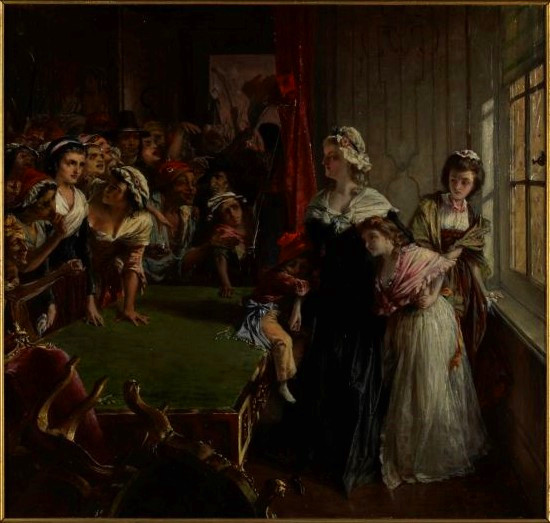
The Tuileries, 1792 by Alfred Elmore

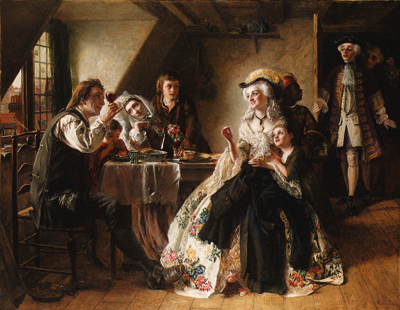
Peg Woffington's Visit to Triplet by Rebecca Solomon

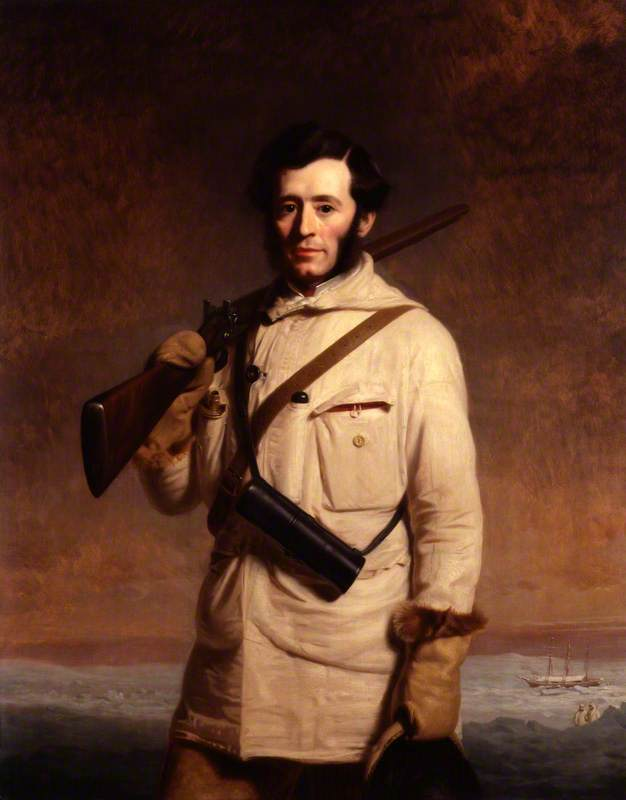
Portrait of Leopold McClintock by Stephen Pearce

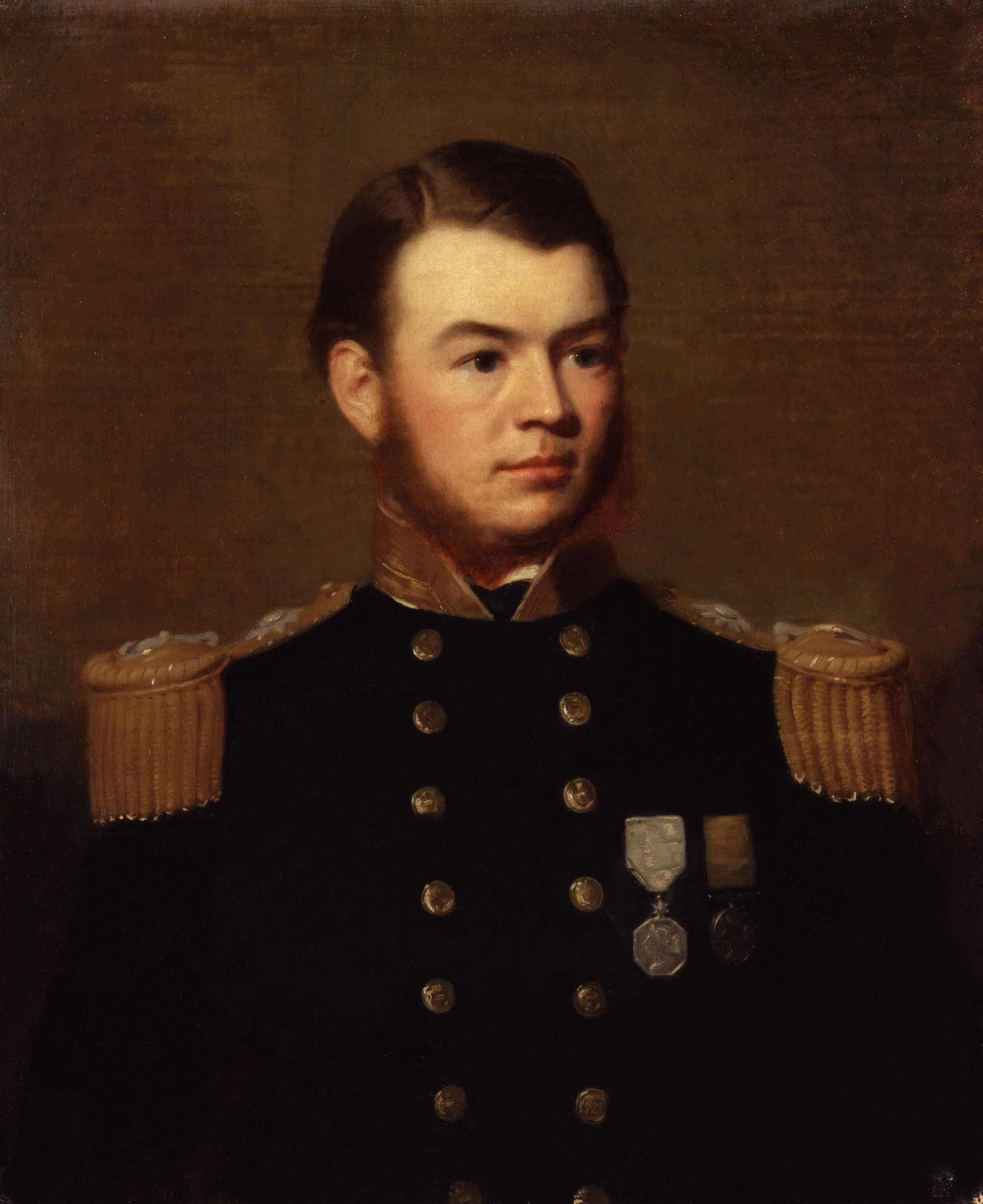
William Robert Hobson by Stephen Pearce

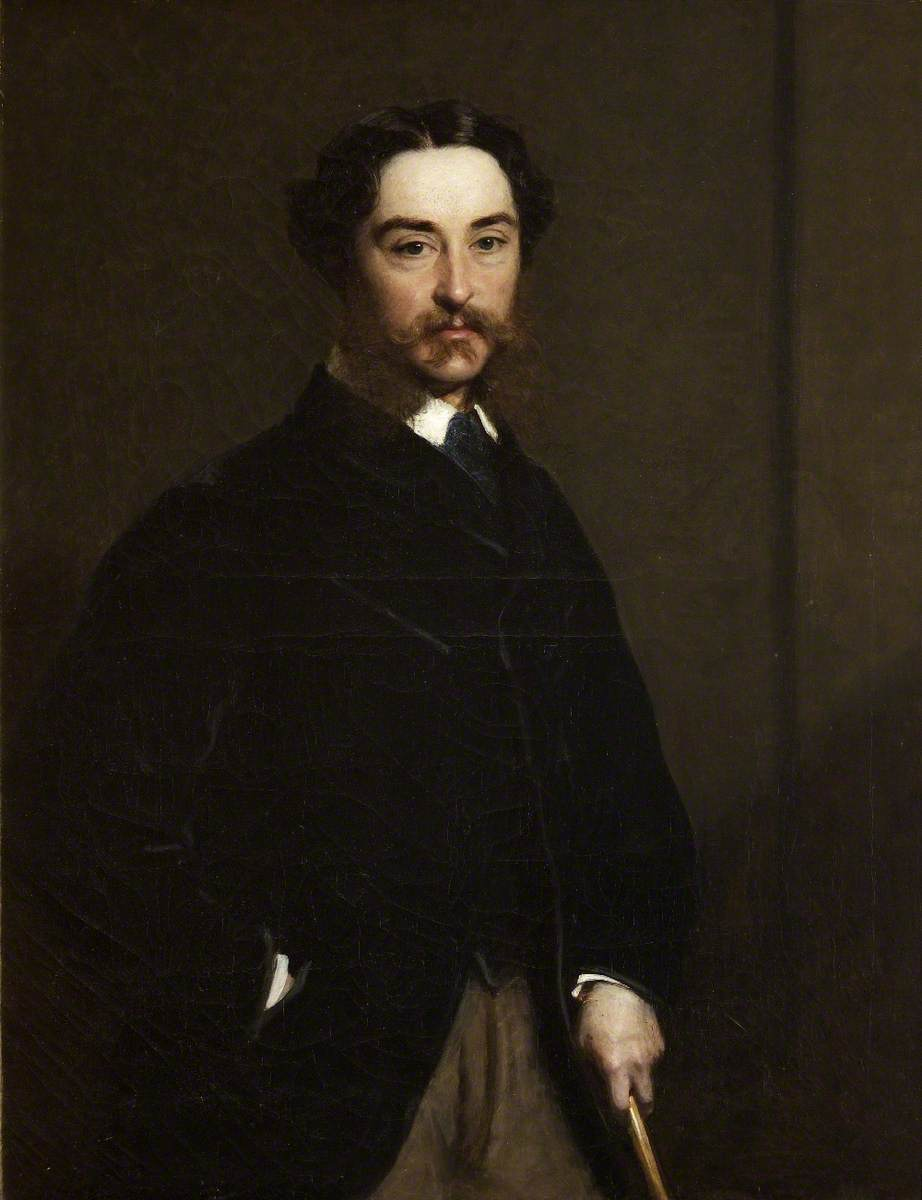
Sir Henry Hoare by John Prescott Knight

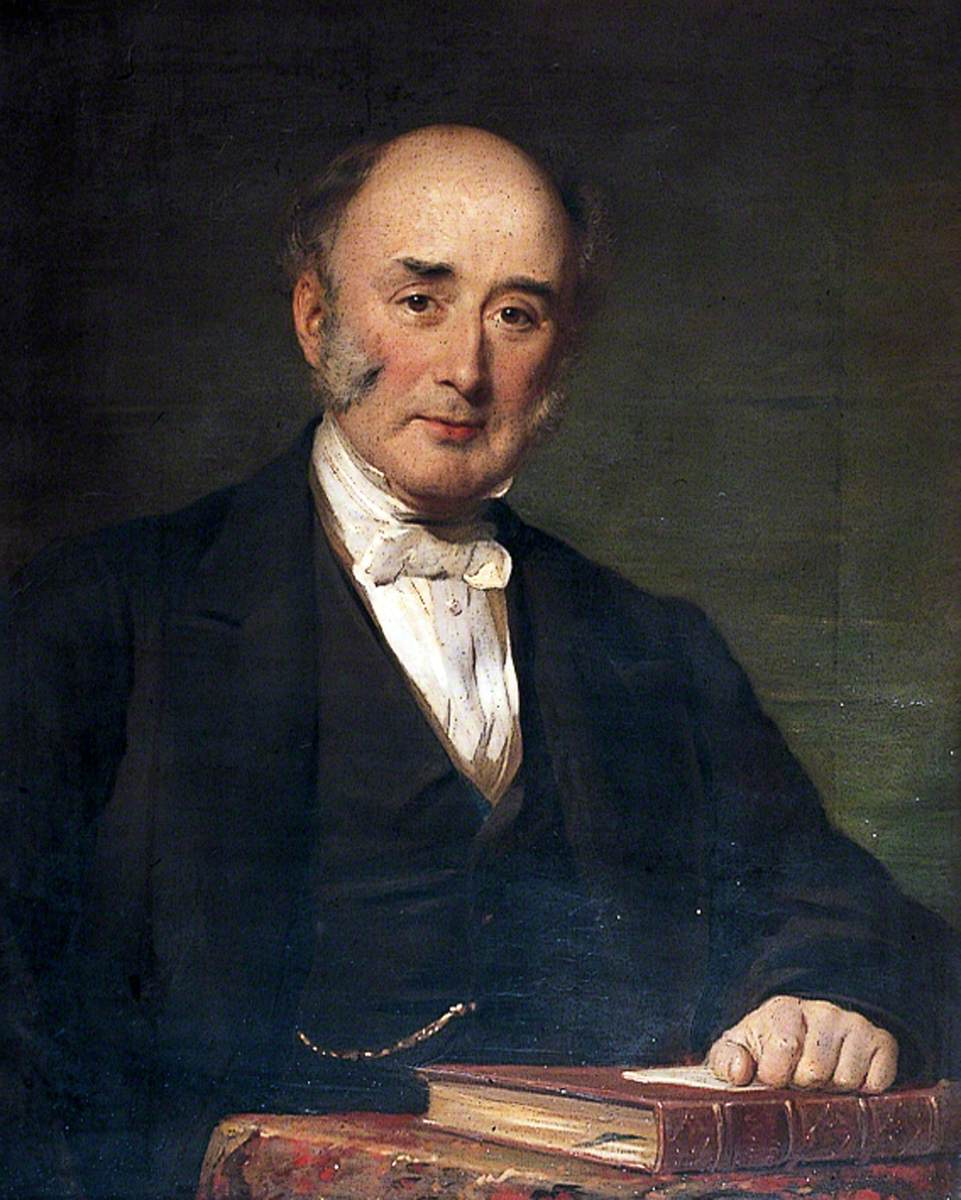
William Gilpin by George Richmond

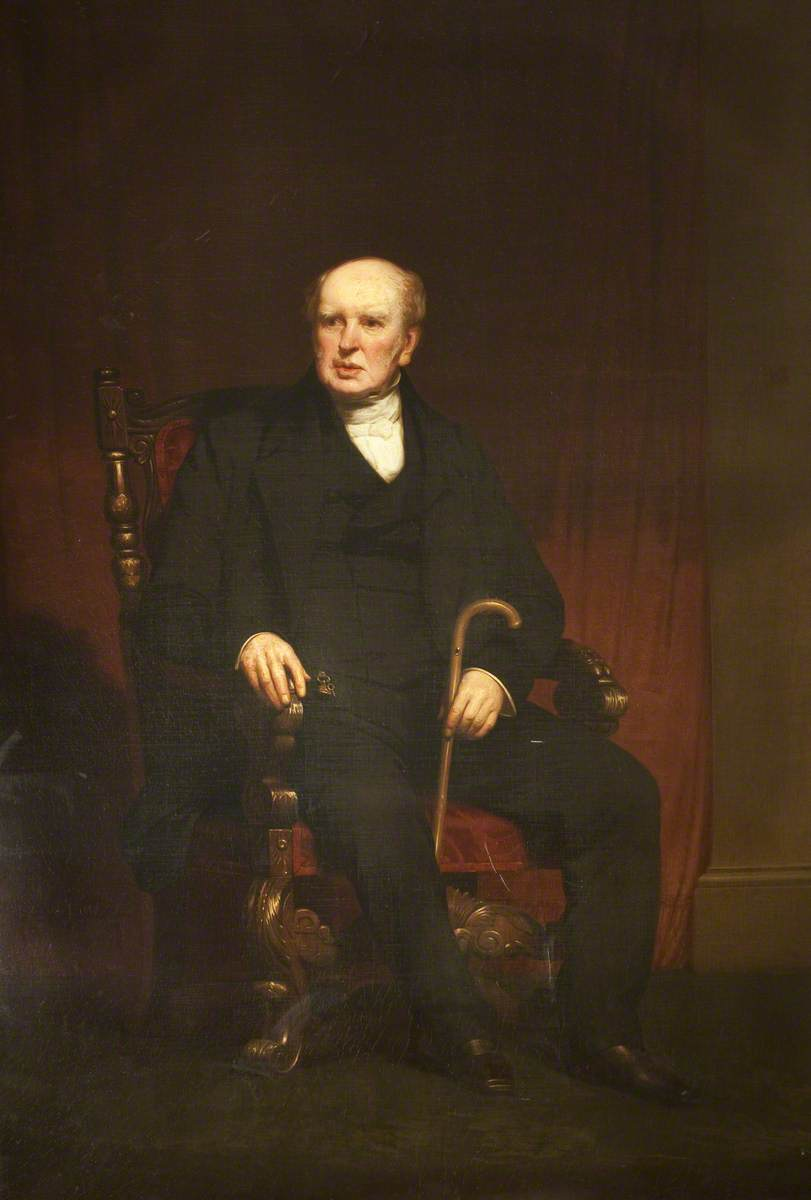
Leonard Redmayne by Philip Westcott

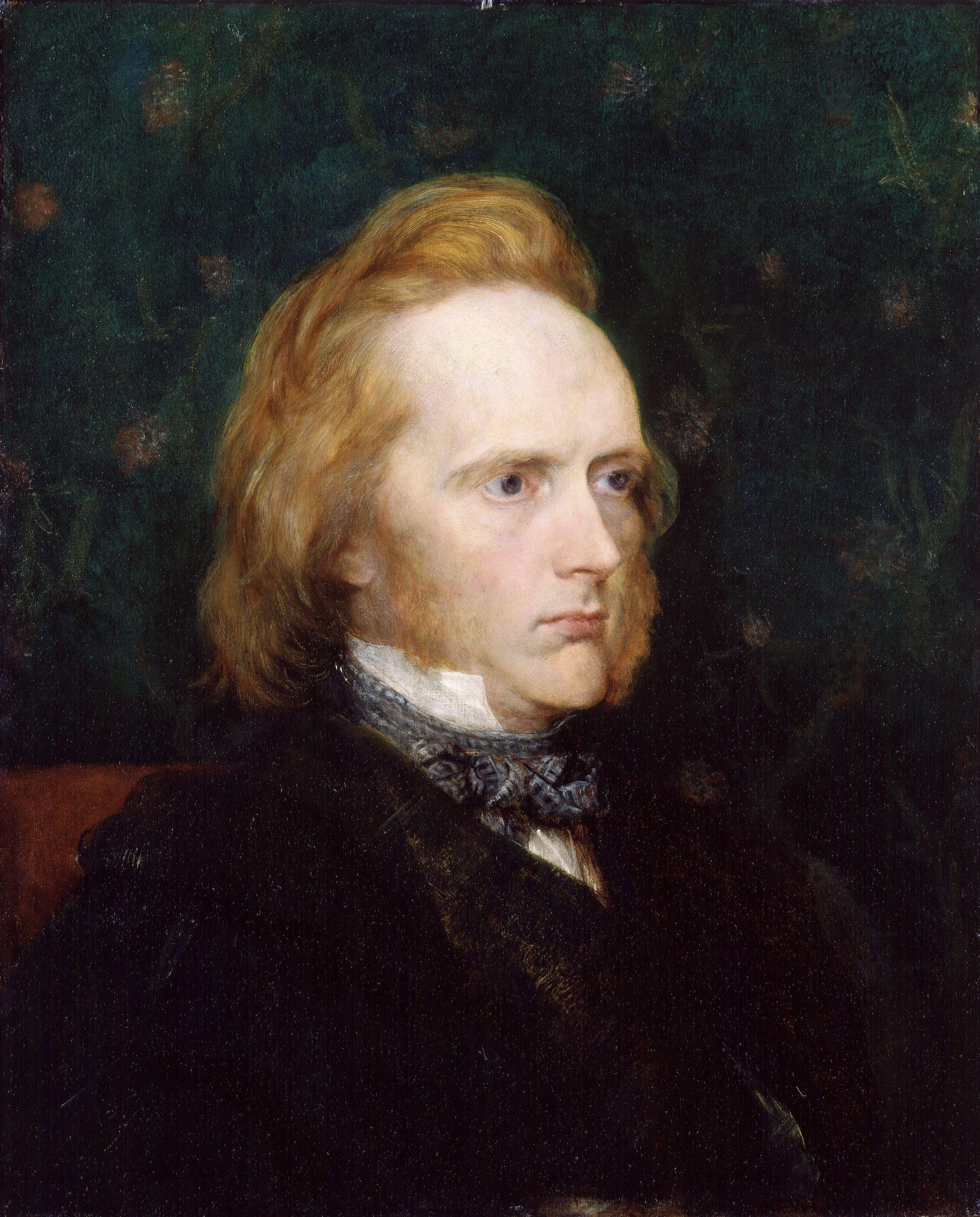
Duke of Argyll by George Frederic Watts

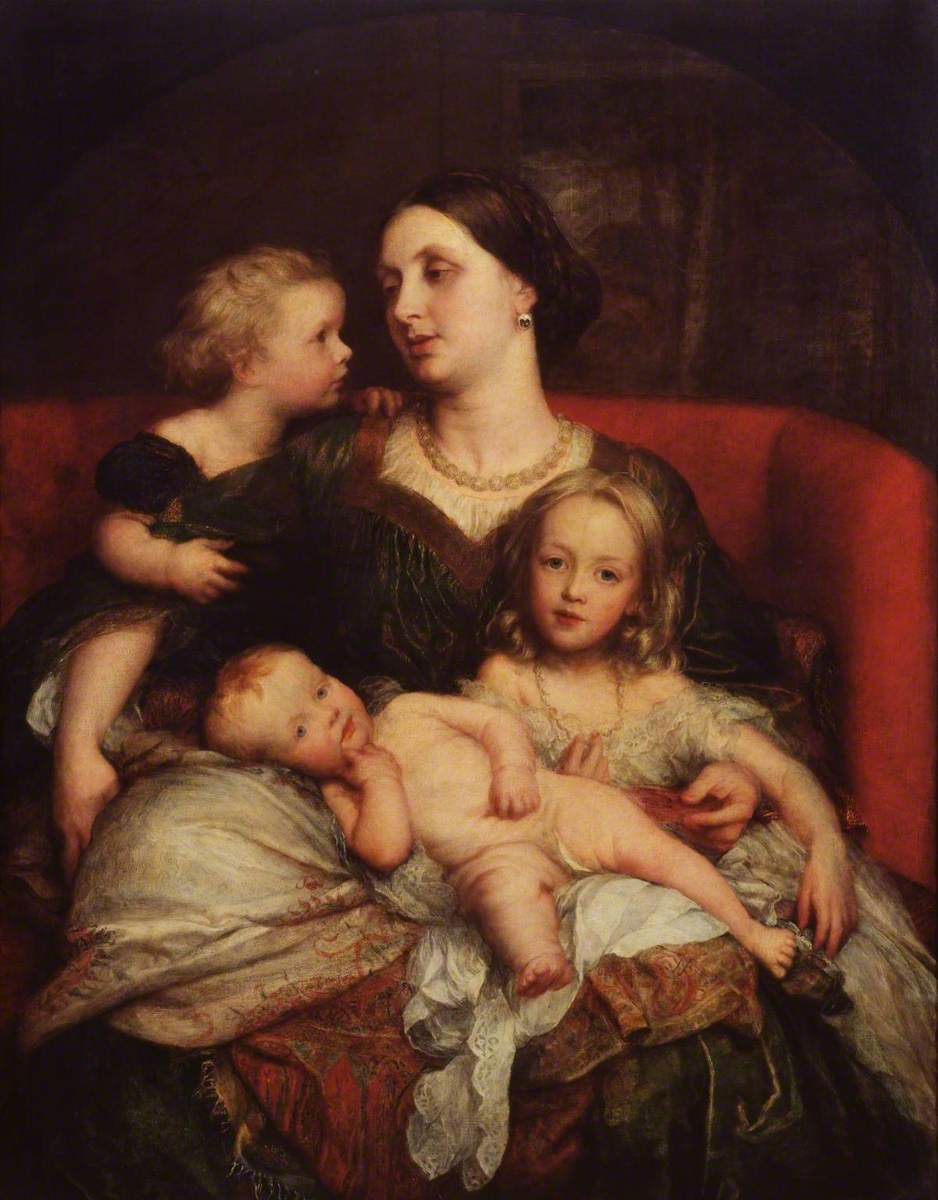
Mrs Cavendish-Bentinck and Her Children by George Frederic Watts

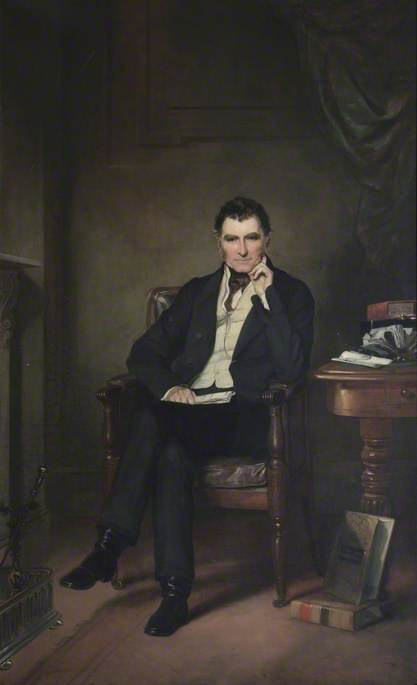
Joseph Warner Henley by Francis Grant

== Bibliography ==
- Donald, Diana. Picturing Animals in Britain, 1750–1850. Yale University Press, 2007.
- Riding, Christine. John Everett Millais. Harry N. Abrams, 2006.
