= The Christening of Victoria, Princess Royal =

1842 painting by Charles Robert Leslie

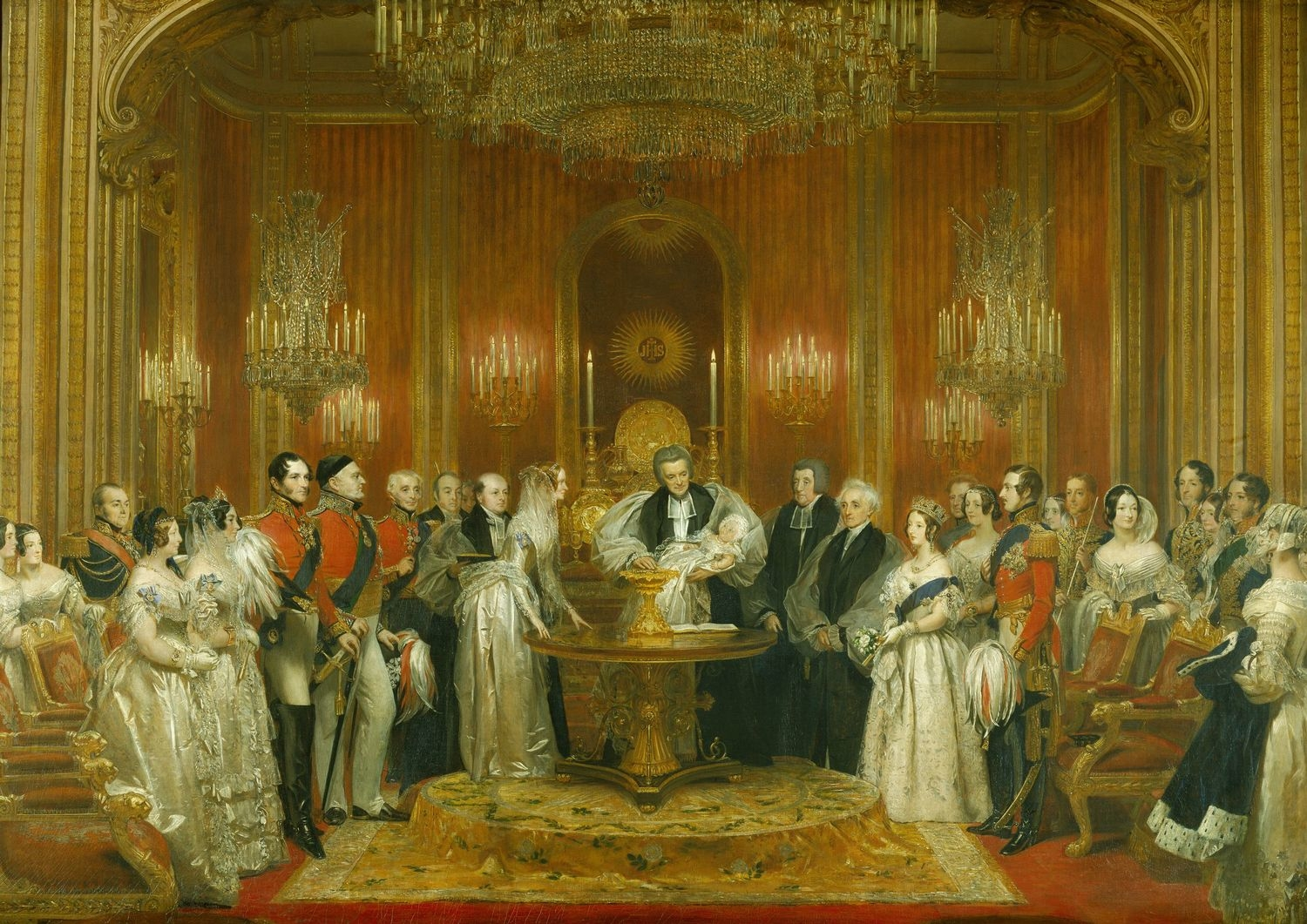
- Artist: Charles Robert Leslie
- Year: 1841-1842
- Type: Oil on canvas
- Dimensions: 129.5 cm × 184.0 cm (51.0 in × 72.4 in)
- Location: Royal Collection

The Christening of Victoria, Princess Royal is an oil on canvas history painting by the American artist Charles Robert Leslie, from 1841-1842.

== History and description ==
It depicts the christening on 10 February 1841 of Victoria, the infant Princess Royal and eldest daughter of Queen Victoria and her husband Albert, the Prince Consort. The painting depicts the ceremony in the Throne Room at Buckingham Palace, during which the Lily Font was used for the first time.

The princess is surrounded by her godparents, namely Queen Adelaide, who is shown stepping forward to name the infant, the Duchess of Gloucester and Edinburgh, the Duchess of Kent and Strathearn, the King of the Belgians, the Duke of Sussex, and the Duke of Wellington, who stood proxy for the Duke of Saxe-Coburg and Gotha. Leslie had personally made a request via Lord Melbourne to paint the ceremony. He produced a slight sketch during the event, followed by studies of the baby and the personages involved, though the painting remained unfinished until 1842 as he struggled to arrange a sitting with Queen Adelaide who was in ill health. An engraving was produced based on the painting in 1849 and an impression was sent to the King of the Belgians who did not find it "successful" in terms of likeness. An engraving of the painting by Henry Thomas Ryall is also kept at the Metropolitan Museum of Art in New York.

== See also ==
- The Marriage of Victoria, Princess Royal, 1860 painting
