= Flood in the Highlands =

Painting by Edwin Landseer

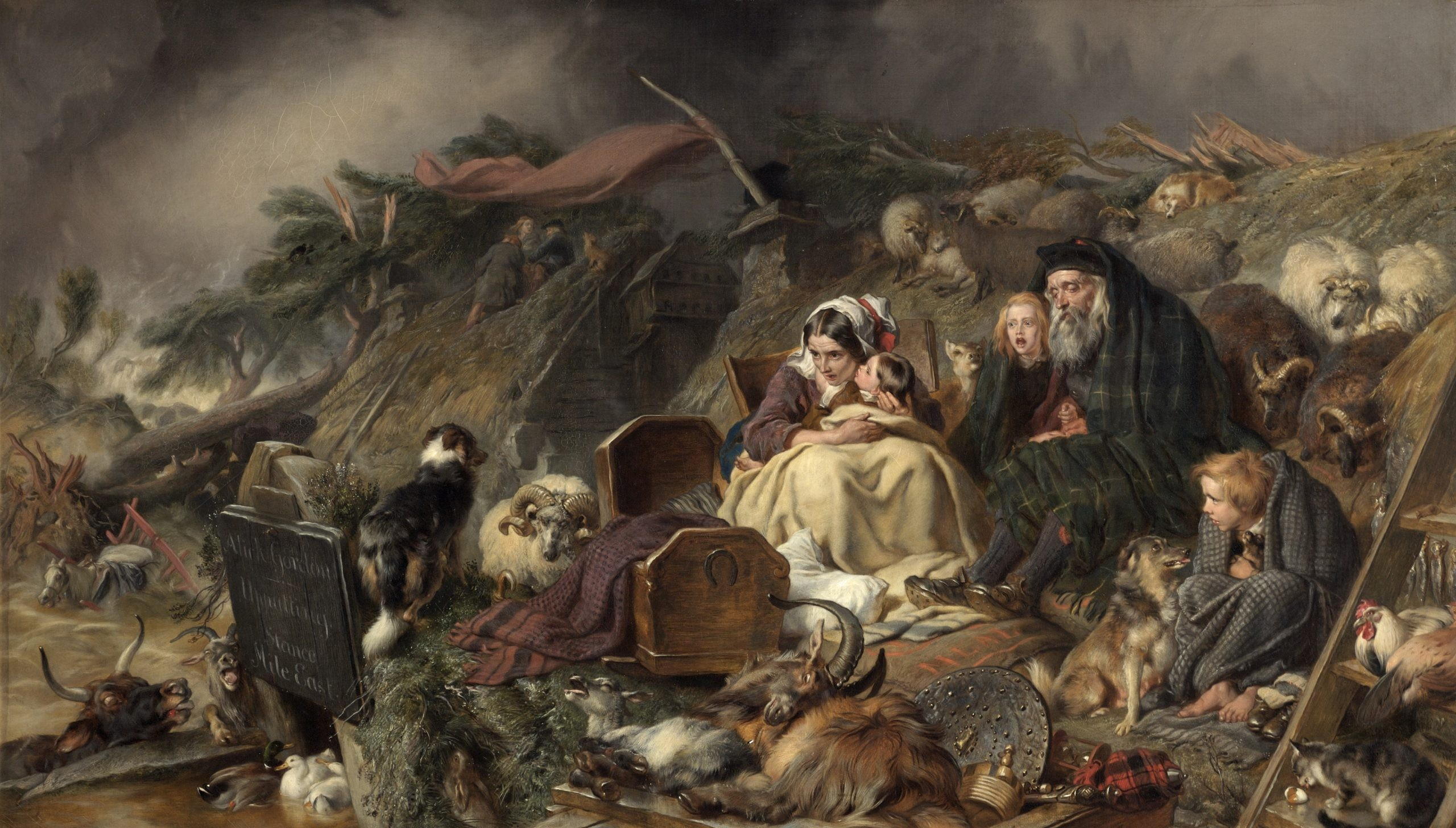
- Artist: Edwin Landseer
- Year: 1860
- Type: Oil on canvas, genre painting
- Dimensions: 177.8 cm × 312.7 cm (70.0 in × 123.1 in)
- Location: Aberdeen Art Gallery, Aberdeen

Flood in the Highlands is an 1860 genre painting by the British artist Edwin Landseer. The picture displays a scene in the Highlands of Scotland during a major flash flood. The inhabitants are shown taking refuge on the roofs of their houses. It resembles a version of Noah's Ark, with the animals and humans huddled together for safety from the rising waters. The painting was inspired by the Moray Flood of 1829, in which many were killed and houses swept away.

The work was displayed at the Royal Academy Exhibition of 1860 at the National Gallery in London. The painting is today in the collection of the Aberdeen Art Gallery, having been acquired in 1947. Landseer also produced a second, replica version of the painting in 1864 which is now in the Russell-Cotes Gallery in Bournemouth. A mezzotint based on the picture was produced by Thomas Lewis Atkinson in 1870.

== Bibliography ==
- Fletcher, Pamela. The Victorian Painting of Modern Life. Taylor & Francis, 2024.
- Ormond, Richard. Sir Edwin Landseer. Philadelphia Museum of Art, 1981.
