= Showing a Preference =

Painting by John Callcott Horsley

- Artist: John Callcott Horsley
- Year: 1860
- Type: Oil on canvas, genre painting
- Dimensions: 91.5 cm × 71.1 cm (36.0 in × 28.0 in)
- Location: Private collection

Showing a Preference is an 1860 oil painting by the British artist John Callcott Horsley. A genre painting it depicts a young sailor of the Royal Navy escorting two woman on a walk through the English countryside. He shows an obvious preference to one of the woman, flirting with her openly to the irritation of the other. Thematically it draws comparison to later works by James Tissot.

Horsley, a brother-in-law of the engineer Isambard Kingdom Brunel, became known for his genre paintings of ordinary life. He likely produced the work at Cranbrook in Kent. The picture was displayed at the Royal Academy Exhibition of 1860 held at the National Gallery in London. The reviewer in the Illustrated London News described it as "a rather smart affair". In 2006 it was auctioned at Christie's for around £300,000. A second slightly, smaller version produced the same year also exhists.

== Bibliography ==
- Kern, Stephen. Eyes of Love: The Gaze in English and French Paintings and Novels, 1840-1900. Reaction Books, 1996.
- Wentworth, Michael. James Tissot. Clarendon Press, 1984.
