= Portrait of Leopold McClintock =

Painting by Stephen Pearce

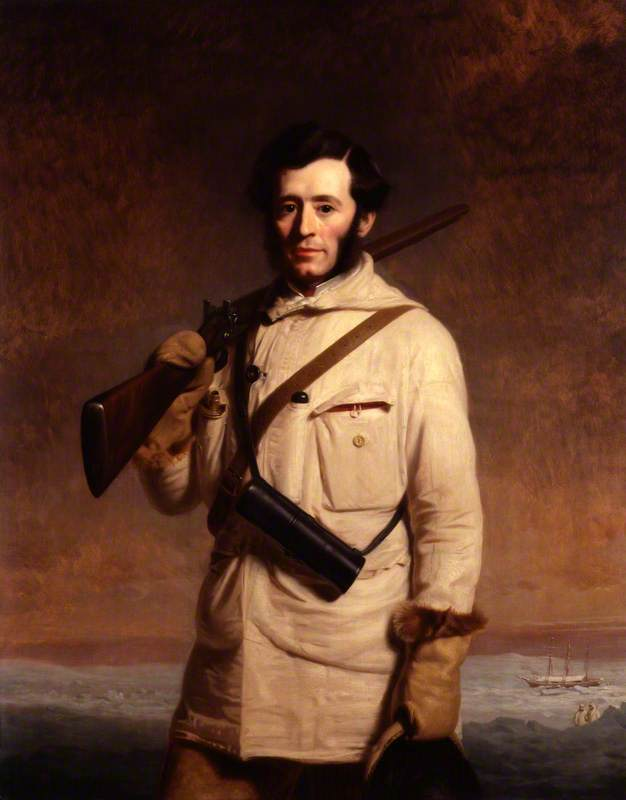
- Artist: Stephen Pearce
- Year: 1859
- Type: Oil on canvas, portrait painting
- Dimensions: 127 cm × 101.9 cm (50 in × 40.1 in)
- Location: National Portrait Gallery, London

Portrait of Leopold McClintock is an 1859 portrait painting by the British artist Stephen Pearce. It depicts the Irish Royal Navy officer and explorer Leopold McClintock. He was particularly known for his role in the search for the lost expedition of John Franklin who had sailed in 1845 to locate and map the Northwest Passage. McClintock's own expedition sailed between 1857 and 1859. He is shown against a polar landscape, rifle over his shoulder, in the costume he had worn during the search. The ship in the background is the Fox which he commanded in the expedition, that established that Franklin had died in 1847.

Pearce painted many of the Artic explorers and likely based the face of this work on his earlier 1856 head-and-shoulders portrait of McClintock in navy uniform which had featured at the Royal Academy's 1857 Exhibition. This painting was displayed at the Royal Academy Exhibition of 1860 held at the National Gallery in London. Today it is in the collection of the National Portrait Gallery, having been acquired in 1899 when it was bequeathed by John Barrow.

== Bibliography ==
- Chambers, Helen. Conrad's Reading: Space, Time, Networks. Springer International Publishing, 2018.
- Murphy, David. The Arctic Fox: Francis Leopold-McClintock, Discoverer of the Fate of Franklin. Dundurn Press, 2004.
- Ormond, Richard. Early Victorian Portraits, National Portrait Gallery, 1974.
