= The Marriage of Victoria, Princess Royal =

Painting by John Phillip

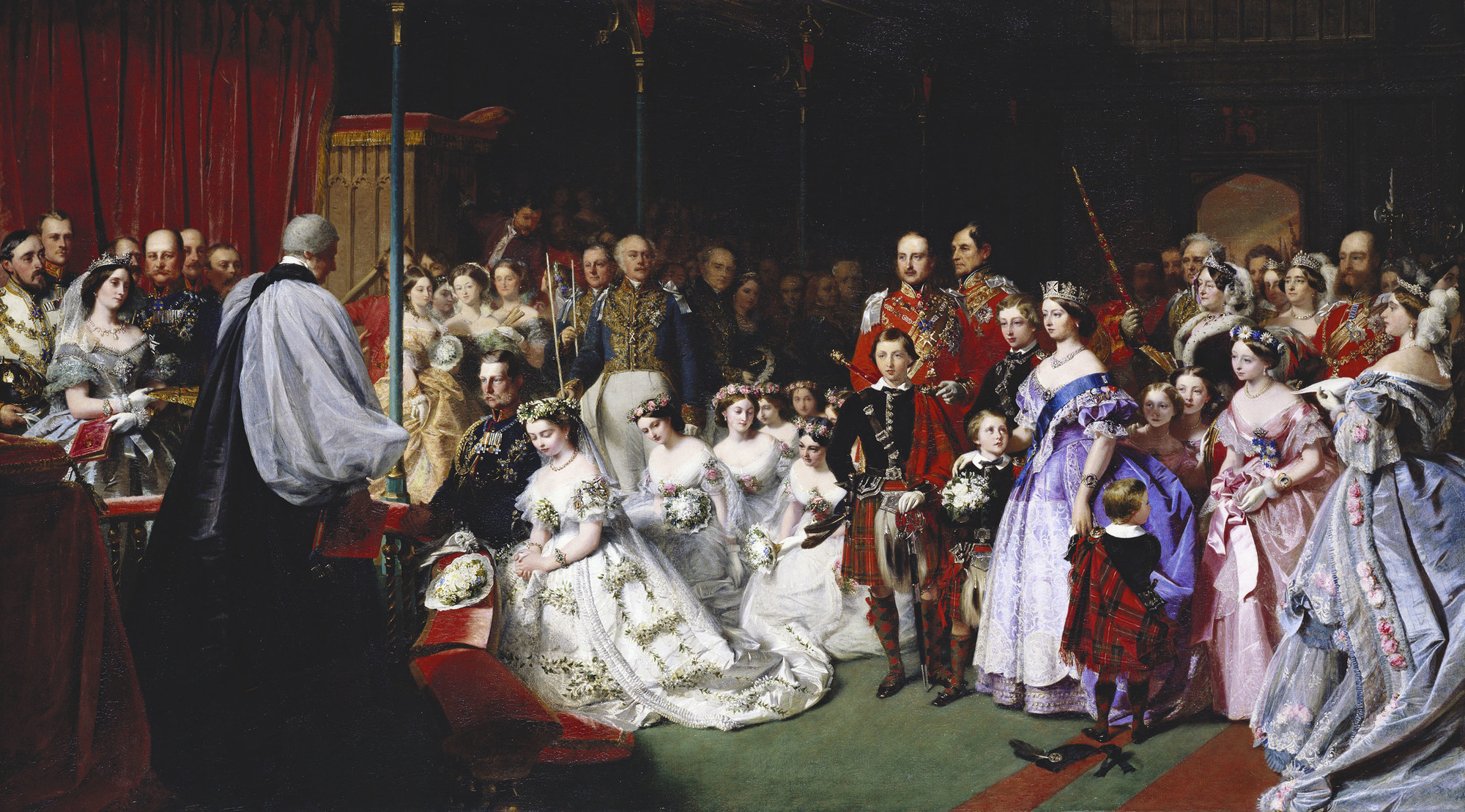
- Artist: John Phillip
- Year: 1860
- Type: Oil on canvas, historical painting
- Dimensions: 103.2 cm × 184 cm (40.6 in × 72 in)
- Location: Royal Collection

The Marriage of Victoria, Princess Royal is an oil on canvas history painting by the British artist John Phillip, from 1860.

== History and description ==
It depicts the wedding of Victoria, Princess Royal and Prince Frederick of Prussia in the Chapel Royal of St. James's Palace on 25 January 1858.

Victoria was the eldest child of Queen Victoria and Prince Albert and was briefly heir presumptive before the birth of her brother Edward, Prince of Wales. Frederick was a nephew of Frederick William IV of Prussia and himself a future emperor of Germany. Their wedding represented a dynastic marriage between the Hohenzollerns and the House of Saxe-Coburg and Gotha.

The work was commissioned by Queen Victoria from Phillip, one of her favourite painters. He made preparatory sketches during the ceremony and later developed individual portraits from the leading figures. Amongst those depicted are Princess Victoria; Prince Frederick; Queen Victoria; Prince Albert; Edward, Prince of Wales; Augusta of Saxe-Weimar-Eisenach; Leopold I of Belgium; Victoria, Duchess of Kent; and Lord Palmerston, the British Prime Minister. Queen Victoria was delighted with the finished painting. In 1875 the painting was hanging in the Grand Corridor at Windsor Castle. It remains in the Royal Collection.

== See also ==
- The Christening of Victoria, Princess Royal, 1842 painting

== Bibliography ==
- Clarke, Deborah & Remington, Vanessa. Scottish Artists 1750-1900: From Caledonia to the Continent. Royal Collection Trust, 2015.
- Harris, John. Buckingham Palace and Its Treasures. Viking Press, 1968.
- Marsden, Jonathan. Victoria & Albert: Art & Love. Royal Collection, 2010.
- Pakula, Hannah. An Uncommon Woman. Simon and Schuster, 1997.
- Urbach, Karina (ed.) Royal Kinship. Anglo-German Family Networks 1815-1918. Walter de Gruyter, 2008.
