= Fox (ship) =

Steam yacht commanded by Francis Leopold McClintock

History

United Kingdom
- Name: Fox
- Builder: Alexander Hall and Sons, Aberdeen
- Launched: 1854
- Fate: Wrecked 1912

General characteristics
- Type: Auxiliary steamship
- Tons burthen: 320 BM
- Length: 132 ft (40.2 m) (hull overall); 120 ft 6 in (36.7 m)
- Beam: 24 ft 4 in (7.4 m)
- Depth of hold: 11 ft 6 in (3.51 m)
- Propulsion: Sails and steam (16 nominal horse power)
- Sail plan: 3-masted schooner rigged
- Complement: 26

The Fox was an 1854 steam yacht commanded by Leopold McClintock on a privately funded 1857–1859 expedition to the North American Arctic Archipelago to search for clues about the fate of Franklin's lost expedition.

== History ==
=== Early service ===
Fox was a built as a yacht for Sir Richard Sutton, 2nd Baronet at a cost of about £5000. The ship's hull was diagonally planked with Scotch larch on the inside and East India teak on the outside, and the two-cylinder auxiliary steam engine of 16 n.h.p. gave a speed of about seven knots.

Fox had made just one cruise to Norway before Sutton's death. After a period of use in the Baltic during the Crimean War, the vessel was laid up in a partly dismantled state at the builders' yards. The executors of Sutton's will sold the ship for £2000 to Lady Jane Franklin, for use in attempting to find her husband, Sir John Franklin, and his expedition.

=== Expedition of 1857–1859 ===
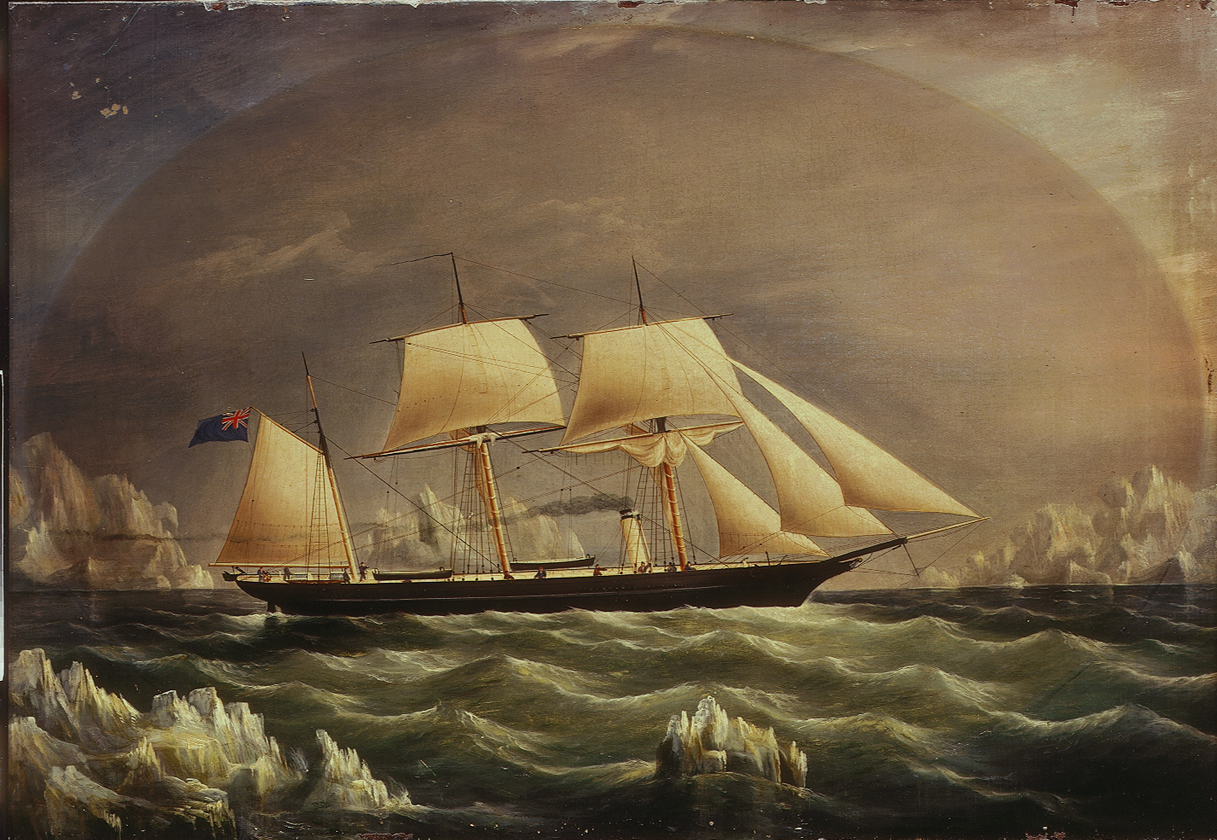
Fox steaming through Arctic waters

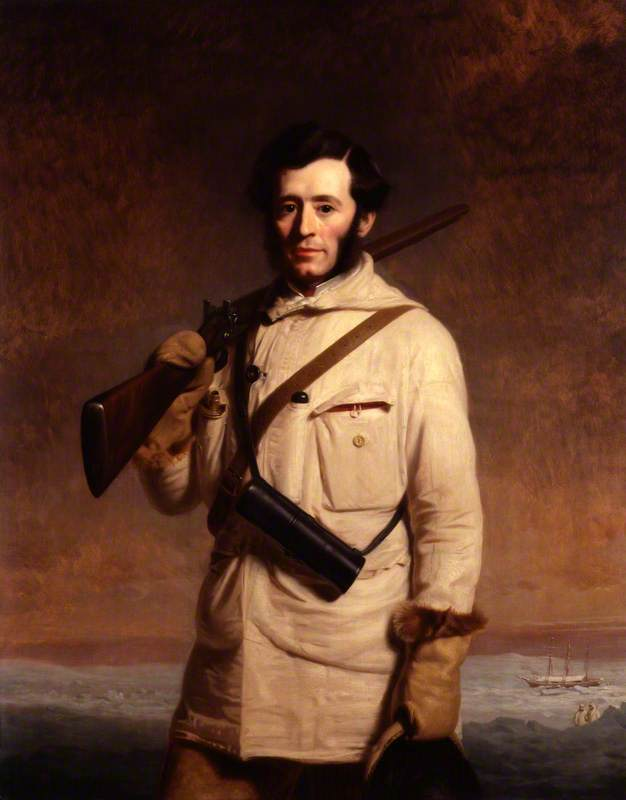
Portrait of Leopold McClintock by Stephen Pearce, 1859, with the Fox in the background

Land-based expeditions in 1854 and 1855 under John Rae and James Anderson had discovered relics from the missing expedition north of Back River, south-west of the Boothia Peninsula. Lady Franklin had previously sent three expeditions to search this area, but all had failed to reach it.

She purchased Fox in April 1857, after finally accepting advice that the 159-ton auxiliary schooner Isabel that she had owned since 1852 was too small for the job, and the government had denied her requests to use HMS Resolute. Sailing Master Allen Young donated £500 towards the subscriptions raised for the expedition. Fox's second-in-command was Lieutenant William Hobson.

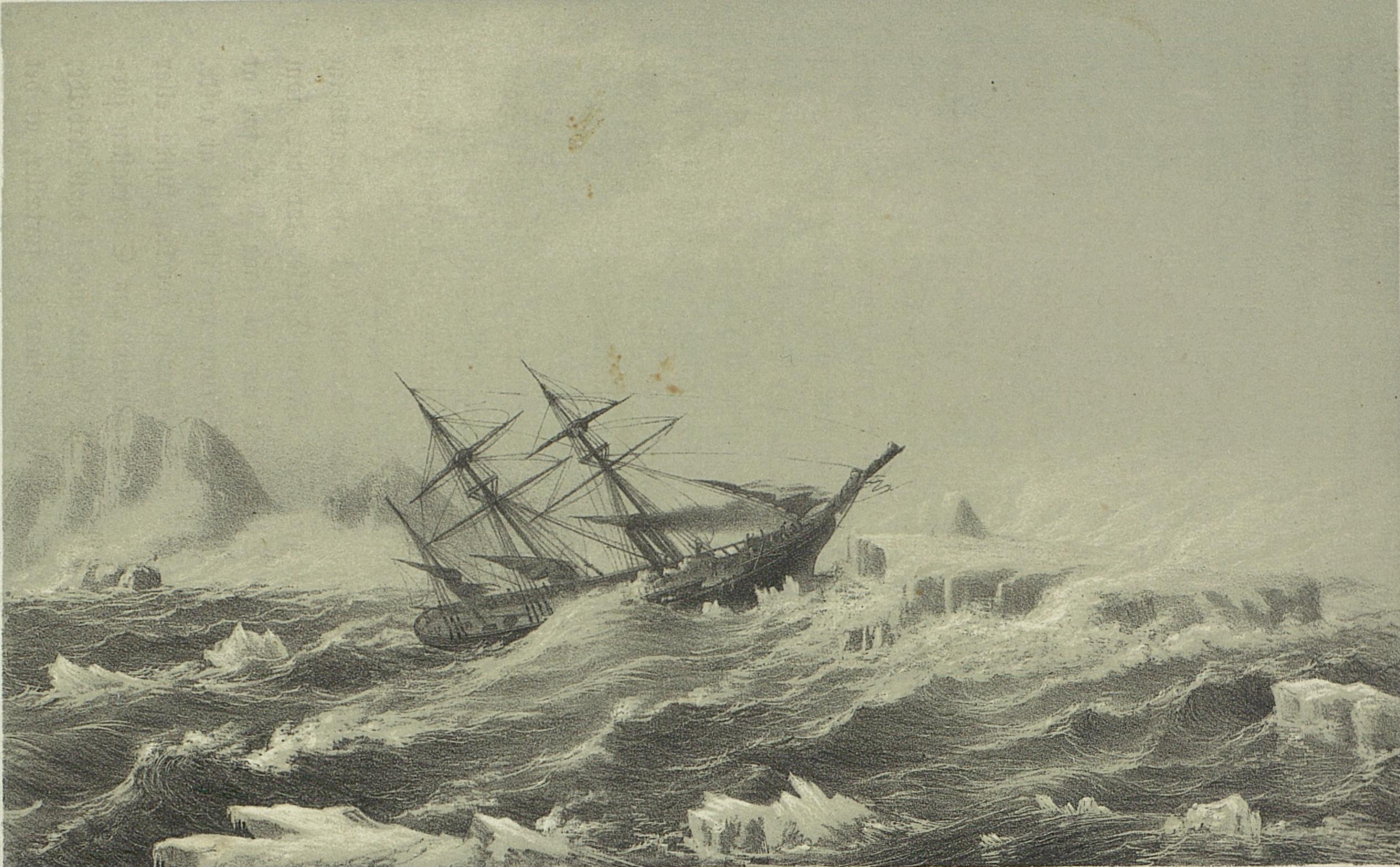
Fox in a hurricane

Fox left Aberdeen on 1 July 1857, and managed to pass through the Bellot Strait briefly before finding a secure winter anchorage to the east of the Strait off the Boothia Peninsula. Over the next two years extensive expeditions were made by sled to the west of the Boothia Peninsula.

On 6 May 1859, Hobson discovered the only written messages from the missing expedition ever found, in cairns on King William Island. The overland parties returned to the ship, which then left for Plymouth, arriving on 20 September. Three of the ship's crew died during the expedition: the engineer from natural causes, his assistant by a shipboard accident, and the steward from scurvy.

=== Later service ===
Still under Allen Young's command, Fox was engaged in survey work between the Faroe Islands and Greenland in conjunction with laying a North Atlantic telegraph cable in 1860–1861, before being sold to the Danish Royal Greenland Company. By the late 1880s, Fox was owned by Akties Kryolith Mine-og Handels Selskabet of Copenhagen, and was refitted with a 17 nhp compound steam engine made by Burmeister & Wain. After a long and useful career, Fox was wrecked on the coast of Greenland in 1912.
