= Phoebe Dighton =

Irish and American painter (1790–1863)

- Born: Phoebe Earl; 1 September 1790; London, Kingdom of Great Britain
- Died: 11 December 1863 (aged 73); Edinburgh, UKGBI
- Other name: Phoebe MacIntyre
- Spouses: Denis Dighton (m. 1812; died 1827); Patrick MacIntyre (m. 1839)
- Children: 2
- Father: James Earl
- Relatives: Augustus Earle (brother); William Henry Smyth (half-brother); Charles Piazzi Smyth (nephew); Ralph Earl (uncle); Ralph Eleaser Whiteside Earl (cousin); John Carteret Pilkington (grandfather); Laetitia Pilkington (great-grandmother); Matthew Pilkington (great-grandfather)

Phoebe Dighton (née Earl, second married name MacIntyre; 1 September 1790 – 11 December 1863) was an Irish and American painter active in Britain. In 1830, Dighton was appointed the Flower Painter in Ordinary to Queen Adelaide.

== Life ==
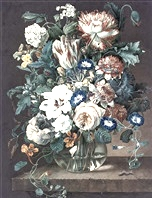
Phoebe Dighton, Still Life

Dighton was born Phoebe Earl (Note: Also cited as Earle.) on 1 September 1790 in London to James Earl, an American painter and an Irish mother Georgiana Caroline Pilkington (1759–1838). On 3 October 1790, Dighton was baptised at St Marylebone Parish Church.

The maternal granddaughter of John Carteret Pilkington, a writer and singer, Dighton was the great-granddaughter of Laetitia Pilkington, a poet and writer, and Matthew Pilkington, a satirist and art historian. Through her father, Dighton was the niece of the artist Ralph Earl and the cousin of the painter Ralph Eleaser Whiteside Earl. One of three siblings, Dighton was older sister of the painter Augustus Earle. Dighton had two older maternal half-siblings, the naval officer and surveyor William Henry Smyth and Elizabeth Smyth, the carer of John Murray, 5th Duke of Atholl.

On 22 June 1812 at St Pancras Old Church in London she married the fellow-painter Denis Dighton and they had two sons, the first not living long while the second, Henry Denis Dighton (1817-1874), became an officer in the British Army. In 1820 her work was first accepted for the Royal Academy Summer Exhibition and she exhibited there for much of the rest of her life. The Royal Society of British Artists also showed her work from 1825 on and she was exhibited at the British Institution.

When her husband's mental health began to fail, she moved with him and their surviving son to Brittany, returning to England after his death in 1827. Settling in the spa town of Leamington, she built up a clientele as a teacher of drawing, painting and wax modelling, with her reputation became national in 1830 when she was given the court post of fruit and flower painter to the new Queen Adelaide. Living close to Stratford-upon-Avon, in 1835 she produced a book of hand-coloured lithographs called Relics of Shakespeare and her work was shown outside England at the Royal Scottish Academy in 1837.

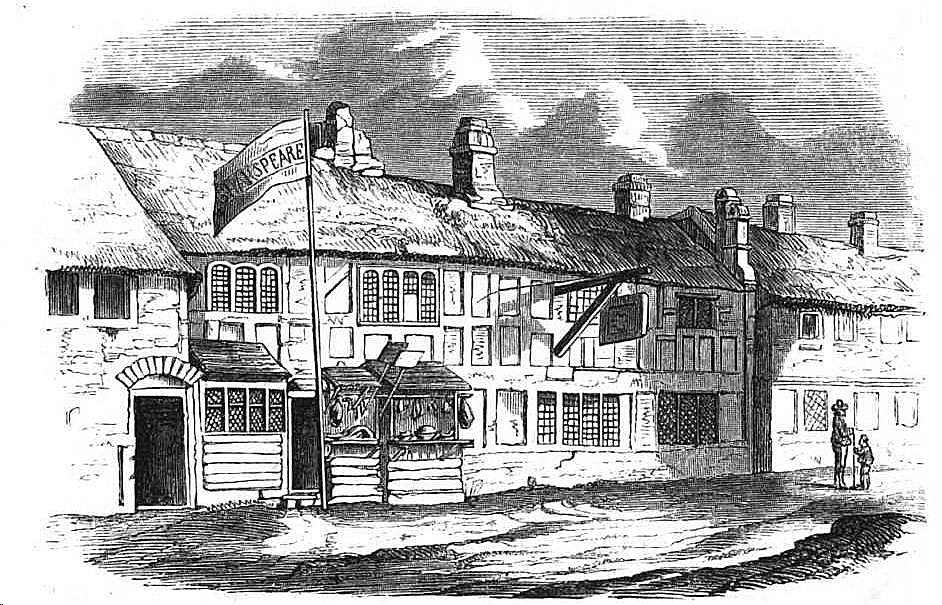
Phoebe Dighton, Shakespeare's Birthplace

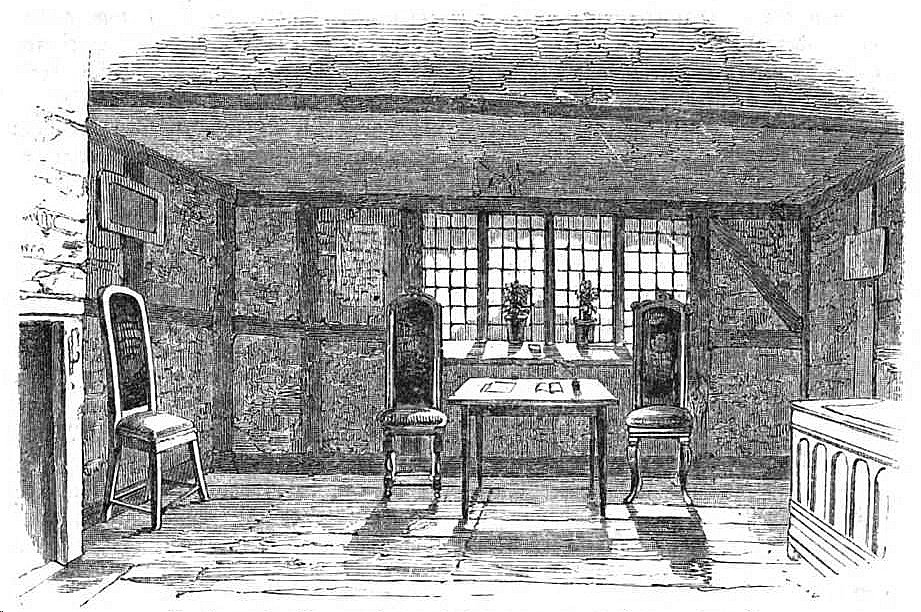
Phoebe Dighton, Inside Shakespeare's Birthplace

On the death in 1838 of her half-sister Elizabeth Smyth (1787-1838), wife of James Murray (1779-1847), who looked after the insane John Murray, 5th Duke of Atholl at his house in Kilburn, Phoebe took over the responsibility and sold her business in Leamington. On 7 February 1839, with her half-brother giving her away, at Christ Church, St Marylebone, she married Patrick MacIntyre, a senior executive of the United Kingdom Life Assurance Company, a predecessor company of Aviva, who moved in with her to care for the Duke.

After the Duke died in 1846, the two moved to Kensington and were able to take a long holiday in Europe. Last shown at the Royal Academy in 1854, she died in Edinburgh on 11 December 1863 during a visit to her nephew Charles Piazzi Smyth and his wife Jessie.

== Books ==
Relics of Shakespeare, from drawings by Mrs. Denis Dighton, by appointment fruit and flower painter to Her Majesty the Queen. Stratford-upon-Avon, June, 1835.
