= James Earl =

American painter

- Born: May 1, 1761; Leicester, Province of Massachusetts Bay, Thirteen Colonies
- Died: August 18, 1796 (aged 35); Charleston, South Carolina, US
- Education: Royal Academy of Arts
- Spouse: Georgiana Caroline Pilkington
- Children: 3, including: Phoebe Dighton; Augustus Earle
- Relatives: Ralph Earl (brother); Ralph Eleaser Whiteside Earl (nephew); John Carteret Pilkington (father-in-law); William Henry Smyth (step-son)

James Earl (May 1, 1761 – August 18, 1796) was an American painter active in London.

== Biography ==
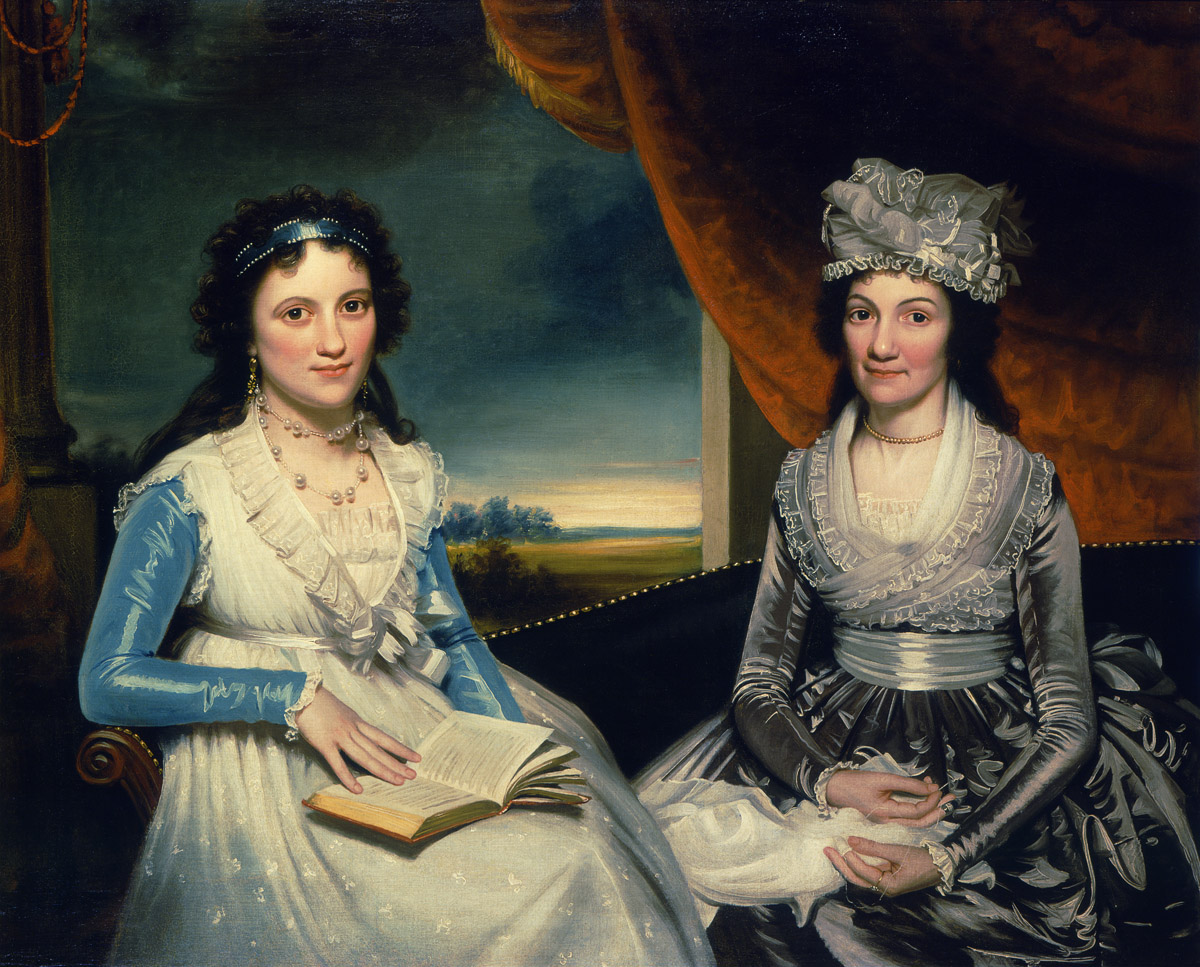
Rebecca Pritchard Mills and Her Daughter Eliza Shrewsbury (1794)

Earl was born May 1, 1761, in Leicester, Province of Massachusetts Bay (present-day Massachusetts) to Ralph Earl and Phebe Whittemore Earl. The younger brother of the painter Ralph Earl, Earl was uncle of painter Ralph Eleaser Whiteside Earl.

On March 24, 1789, Earl enrolled at the Royal Academy of Arts and is known to have been in England by 1787. His British clientele were mostly Loyalists living in exile, though there is no evidence that he was a committed Loyalist himself. Among his best known works are Rebecca Pritchard Mills and Her Daughter Eliza Shrewsbury (ca. 1795) and a portrait of Charles Cotesworth Pinckney.

== Personal life ==
Earl married Georgiana Caroline Pilkington (1759–1838), the daughter of the Irish writer and singer John Carteret Pilkington. The couple had three children, including the painters Phoebe Dighton and Augustus Earle. Earl was the step-father of two children from his wife's previous relationship, including the naval officer and surveyor William Henry Smyth.

On August 18, 1796, Earl died in Charleston, South Carolina of yellow fever.
