= Henry Toynbee =

Henry Toynbee FRAS FRGS (22 October 1819 – 29 March 1909) was a merchant sailor and an early meteorologist, whose career was dedicated to passing on his expertise. He introduced local weather-forecasting to the British Isles.

== Personal life ==
Henry Toynbee was born in Heckington, Lincolnshire on 22 October 1819, and baptised there the next day. He was the sixth son of fifteen children of the wealthy land owner and farmer George Toynbee (1783–1865). George's first wife, and Henry's mother, was Elizabeth, née Cullen, (1785–1820). Henry's parents were married at Bracebridge, Lincolnshire, on 21 May 1811, by Licence.

On 22 December 1854 Henry, aged 35, married 25-year-old Ellen Philadelphia Smyth (July 1828 – 1881), a daughter of Admiral William Henry Smyth. Her brothers were:

- Sir Warington Wilkinson Smyth FRS, 24 August 1817 – 19 June 1890
- Charles Piazzi Smyth, 3 January 1819 – 21 February 1900
- General Sir Henry Augustus Smyth, 25 November 1825 – 18 September 1906

Her sisters were:

- Henrietta Grace Smyth, 3 September 1824 – 13 October 1914, who married Baden Powell
- Georgiana Rosetta Smyth, 19 February 1835 – 7 January 1923, who married Sir William Henry Flower KCB

Henry Toynbee and his wife Ellen had no children. She died aged 53 in 1881 in Kensington

== Career ==
=== At sea ===
At the age of fourteen Henry signed on as a midshipman and was appointed to the Dunvegan Castle. He then became third officer for Thomas & William Smith, ship builders, established in 1756 at St. Peter's, Newcastle upon Tyne, and later took command of some of their best-known ships.

While at sea, he had a reputation as a navigator, and for holding daily navigation classes, through which he trained some the best navigators of his era. In addition, he submitted several Papers to the Royal Astronomical Society on the subject of rating chronometers by lunar distance.

His wife often sailed with him, and added her illustrations to his meteorological logbooks.

In 1859 the President of the Board of Trade presented Henry Toynbee with a gold pocket watch "for the best meteorological registers since 1855." The British Meteorological Office have a portrait of him.

=== On land ===
In 1866, aged 47, Henry went ashore, and became Marine Superintendent of the Meteorological Office. Here he produced his "Barometer Manual", and during the next twenty-one years wrote many papers on meteorology.

He also provided information about weather conditions in the Southern Ocean to Sir George Airy for planning the 1874 Transit of Venus Expeditions.

During 1888 and 1889 at the request of the Council of the Meteorological Office Toynbee gave lectures at various British ports on the use of the barometer for seafarers. In 1890 the lectures were published as "Weather Forecasting for the British Islands by means of a barometer, the direction and force of wind and cirrus clouds".

== Death ==
Toynbee died in London on 29 March 1909, aged 89.
