= William Henry Smyth =

Royal Navy Admiral (1788–1865)

Admiral William Henry Smyth FRS FSA FRAS FRGS
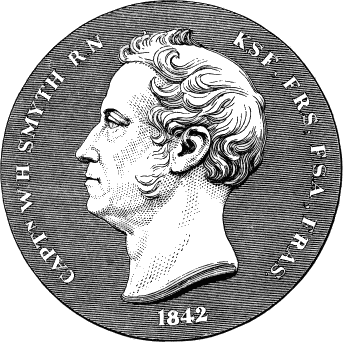
- Smyth, as depicted in his The Sailor's Word-Book
- Born: 21 January 1788; Westminster, London
- Died: 8 September 1865 (aged 77); Stone, Buckinghamshire
- Burial place: Stone, Buckinghamshire
- Spouse: Eliza Anne "Annarella" Warington (m. 1815)
- Relatives: Warington Wilkinson Smyth (son); Charles Piazzi Smyth (son); Henry Augustus Smyth (son); Robert Baden-Powell, 1st Baron Baden-Powell (grandson)
- Military career
- Allegiance: United Kingdom
- Branch: Royal Navy
- Service years: 1804–1846
- Rank: Admiral
- Commands: Gunboat Mors aut Gloria; HMS Scylla; HMS Aid (later Adventure)
- Conflicts: Napoleonic Wars; Walcheren Campaign; Siege of Cádiz
- Awards: Order of Saint Ferdinand and of Merit
- Other work: Astronomer and numismatist

Admiral William Henry Smyth (21 January 1788 – 8 September 1865) was an English Royal Navy officer, hydrographer, astronomer and numismatist. He is noted for his involvement in the early history of a number of learned societies, for his hydrographic charts, for his astronomical work, and for a wide range of publications and translations.

== Origins ==
William Henry Smyth was the only son of Joseph Smyth (died 1788) and Georgiana Caroline Pitt Pilkington (died 1838), the daughter of John Carteret Pilkington and the granddaughter of Laetitia Pilkington and her husband Matthew Pilkington. His father, Joseph Smyth, an American Loyalist from New Jersey who served as a lieutenant in the King's Royal Regiment of New York during the Revolutionary War, was the sixth son of Benjamin Smyth (died 1769), a landowner in what is now Blairstown, and his first wife Catherina Schoonhoven (died 1750).

Never having known his father, the Admiral grew up with a half-brother Augustus Earle and a half-sister Phoebe Earle.

To conceal the disreputability of his parents and his probable illegitimacy, his descendants, in particular his daughter Henrietta Grace Smyth, invented an imaginary ancestry. Their claims, which were reproduced in works like Burke's Peerage, included alleged descent from the childless Captain John Smith, whose coat of arms they adopted, and a fictitious relationship with Lord Nelson. Genealogical research they had commissioned in England and the USA, suggesting that his father Joseph Smyth was in fact a forger, a perjurer and a bigamist, was suppressed.

== Royal Navy ==
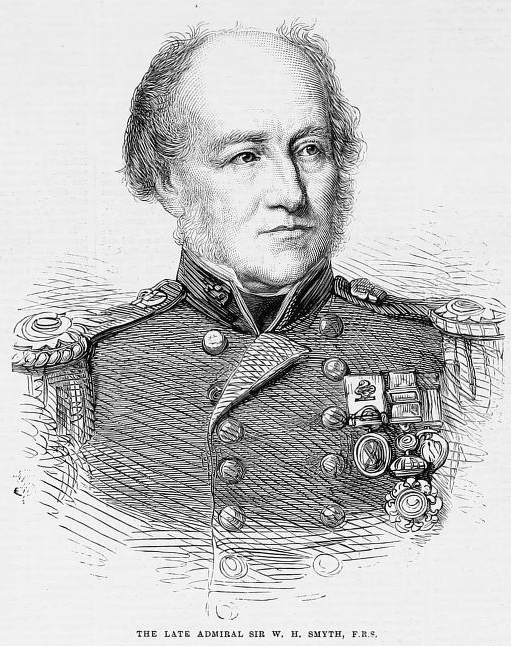

In 1802, aged 14, Smyth ran away from his poverty-stricken home to be a cabin boy aboard a merchant ship, which was subsequently commandeered by the Royal Navy; he entered as an ordinary seaman. In 1804 he was in the East India Company's ship Marquis Cornwallis, which the government chartered for an expedition against the Seychelles. In the following March, as Cornwallis the vessel was bought by the Royal Navy to be a 50-gun ship under the command of Captain Charles James Johnston, with whom Smyth remained, seeing much active service in Indian, Chinese, Australian and Pacific waters. In February 1808 he followed Johnston to Powerful, which, on returning to England, was part of the force in the expedition to the Scheldt, and was paid off in October 1809. He afterwards served in the 74-gun Milford on the coast of France and Spain, and was lent from her to command the Spanish gunboat Mors aut Gloria at the defence of Cadiz from September 1810 to April 1811. In July 1811 he joined Rodney off Toulon, and through 1812 served on the coast of Spain.

On 25 March 1813 (aged 25) he was promoted to lieutenant and appointed to the Sicilian flotilla, in which he combined service against the French from Naples with a good deal of unofficial hydrographic surveying and antiquarian research. For his services in defending Sicily, he was subsequently awarded the Order of Saint Ferdinand and of Merit by King Ferdinand I of the Two Sicilies, and received permission from the Prince Regent to wear it.

Smyth's chart of the harbour of Villa-Franca (Villefranche-sur-Mer)

On 18 September 1815 (aged 27) he was promoted to Commander and in command of the brig Scylla continued surveying the coast of Sicily, the adjacent coasts of Italy, and the opposite shores of Africa. In 1817 his survey work was put on a more formal footing by his appointment to Aid. In 1821 this vessel was renamed Adventure and later accompanied Beagle on the first voyage of the Beagle, in which Smyth's half-brother Augustus Earle was the official artist. In Aid, Smyth carried on the hydrographic survey of the Italian, Sicilian, Greek, and African coasts, and constructed a very large number of charts, used by the Royal Navy among others until the mid-20th century. As a result, he became known as "Mediterranean Smyth". His hydrographic operations in the Adriatic, in collaboration with the Austrian and Neapolitan authorities, resulted in the Carta di Cabottaggio del Mare Adriatico, published in 1822–24.

While in Sicily in 1817, he met the Italian astronomer Giuseppe Piazzi in Palermo and visited his observatory; this sparked his interest in astronomy and he gave his second son (who became a noted astronomer) the name Piazzi. Smyth published some of his work in his Memoir description of the Resources, Inhabitants, and Hydrography of Sicily and its Islands (London, 1824), which was followed in 1828 by a Sketch of Sardinia. Subsequently, in 1854, he was awarded the Royal Geographical Society's Founder's Medal in recognition of his survey work in the Mediterranean.

On 7 February 1824, aged 36, he was promoted to Post-Captain, and in November he paid off the Adventure. He remained on the Active List on full pay, ready for active service, but this actually was the end of his service at sea, and he turned to a life of literary and scientific pursuits. In 1846 aged 58, he retired from the Navy on half-pay, being advanced on the retired list to Rear-Admiral on 28 May 1853, then to Vice-Admiral on 17 May 1858, and finally to Admiral on 14 November 1863, aged 75.

== Astronomy ==
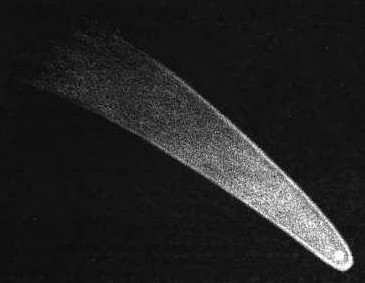
The Great Comet of 1811, as drawn by William Henry Smyth

Returning to England and settling at Bedford, in 1825 he fitted out a private observatory equipped with a 5.9-inch refractor telescope at his home at 6 The Crescent. He used this instrument to observe a variety of deep sky objects over the course of the 1830s, including double stars, star clusters and nebulae. He published his observations in 1844 in the Cycle of Celestial Objects, which earned him the Gold Medal of the Royal Astronomical Society in 1845 and also the presidency of the society. The first volume of this work was on general astronomy, but the second volume became known as the Bedford Catalogue and contained his observations of 1,604 double stars and nebulae. It served as a standard reference work for many years afterward; no astronomer had previously made as extensive a catalogue of dim objects such as this. It was reprinted in 1986 with a foreword by George Lovi stating:

What makes it so special is that it is the first true celestial Baedeker and not just another "cold" catalogue of mere numbers and data. Like the original Baedeker travel guidebooks of the last century, this work is full of colorful commentary on the highlights of the heavenly scene and heavily influenced several subsequent works of its type, even to the present day. ...It is in the descriptive material that Smyth is a delight. He not only describes what the user of a small telescope will see, but also includes much fascinating astronomical, mythological, and historical lore. Many of these descriptions are especially valuable for the novice and user of small telescopes of a size similar to Smyth's.

Having completed his observations, he moved to Cardiff in 1839 to supervise the construction of the Bute Dock which he had designed. His observatory was dismantled and the telescope was sold to Dr John Lee, who re-erected it in a new observatory of Smyth's design at Hartwell House near the village of Stone in Buckinghamshire. Smyth moved to Stone in 1842 and, still having access to the telescope, performed a large number of additional astronomical observations from 1839 to 1859. The telescope is now in the Science Museum, London.

He also produced observations in a publication on star colours entitled "Sidereal Chromatics" in 1864, which attempted to explain their nature, the effects of the Earth's atmosphere, and the possibility of change in colour due to Doppler Shift. While his premise proved ultimately wrong, he discussed and created a summary on observing star colours of many double stars under his so-called Hartwell Experiment. Some of his ideas continued to be promoted into the early 20th century, but were mostly then rejected by the overwhelming evidence from astronomical spectroscopy.

== Numismatics ==
He was a numismatist of some standing, being a founding member of the Royal Numismatic Society in 1836 and one of the first members of its council. He maintained a lifelong interest in coins and was the author of a number of treatises on the subject.

== Involvement with learned institutions ==
In 1821 he became a fellow of the Society of Antiquaries of London and of the Royal Astronomical Society (RAS). On 15 June 1826 he was elected Fellow of the Royal Society, and in 1830 was one of the founders of the Royal Geographical Society (RGS). In 1845–6 he was president of the RAS and in 1849–50, of the RGS. He was vice-president and foreign secretary of the Royal Society; vice-president and director of the Society of Antiquaries; and an honorary or corresponding member of at least three-fourths of the literary and scientific societies in Europe. as well as those in the United States. Among these were the Royal Irish Academy, the Institut de France, the Accademia Pontaniana, the National Institute of Washington, and the American Academy of Arts and Sciences (1847), and the Naval Lyceum of New York. He also served on the Board of Visitors to the Greenwich Observatory. He contributed numerous papers to the Philosophical Transactions and the Proceedings of the RAS and RGS, and from 1829 to 1849 to the United Service Journal.

== Later literary work ==
He was the author of many works, the best known of which are:

- A Cycle of Celestial Objects for the use of Naval, Military, and Private Astronomers for which he was awarded the gold medal of the Royal Astronomical Society. Published as two volumes in 1844, volume I: Prolegomena; Volume II: The Bedford Catalogue., it is still in print;
- The Mediterranean: a Memoir Physical, Historical, and Nautical (1854). His charts of the Mediterranean, made in the 1820s, were still in use by the Royal Navy until the 1960s;
- The Sailor's Word-Book, first published in 1867, and still available in print and as an e-book. This is a comprehensive dictionary of nautical terms which, as well as sail, covers the early years of steam propulsion.

He also translated and edited François Arago's treatises on Popular Astronomy and on Comets.

== Last years ==
As well as his home at St John's Lodge in Stone, he kept a house at 3 Cheyne Walk in Chelsea, London, where he stayed while attending the various learned societies and where he entertained his like-minded friends. One of these was the Rev, Prof. Baden Powell (mathematician), then a widower, who met at this house Smyth's daughter Henrietta Grace, and married her.Tim Jeal

In early September 1865, he suffered a heart attack at St John's Lodge and at first seemed to recover. On the evening of 8 September he showed the planet Jupiter to his young grandson, Arthur Smyth Flower, through a telescope. He died a few hours later, in the early morning of 9 September, at the age of 78, and was buried in the graveyard of St John the Baptist church at Stone, Buckinghamshire.

His obituary in the Monthly Notices of the Royal Astronomical Society noted:

As President of the Astronomical Club, he was always genial & courteous, ever keeping things in happy order, and by his ready wit and flow of humour compelling the maintenance of good fellowship. He used to fill his pockets with new half-pennies to distribute to any children he met in his daily walks. Whatever he did, he did it with his might.

A lunar mare was named Mare Smythii in his honour, as was Smyth Channel in the fiords of Chile and Cape Smyth in the Antarctic.

== Family ==
In Messina on 7 October 1815, when both were aged 27, he married Eliza Anne ("Annarella"), only child of Thomas Warington, the British consul in Naples, and his first wife Anne, widow of Lewis Bradshaw Peirson and daughter of William Robinson. They had eleven children, five of whom either achieved prominence or married notable spouses:

- Warington Wilkinson Smyth (1817–1890)
- Charles Piazzi Smyth (1819–1900)
- Henrietta Grace Smyth (1824–1914), who married Baden Powell and was mother of nine, including Robert Baden-Powell, 1st Baron Baden-Powell
- Henry Augustus Smyth (1825–1906)
- Georgiana Rosetta Smyth (1835–1923), who married Sir William Henry Flower and had seven children, including Stanley Smyth Flower.
- Ellen Philadelphia Smyth (1828–1881), who married the meteorologist Captain Henry Toynbee FRAS FRGS (1819–1909)

== Portraits ==
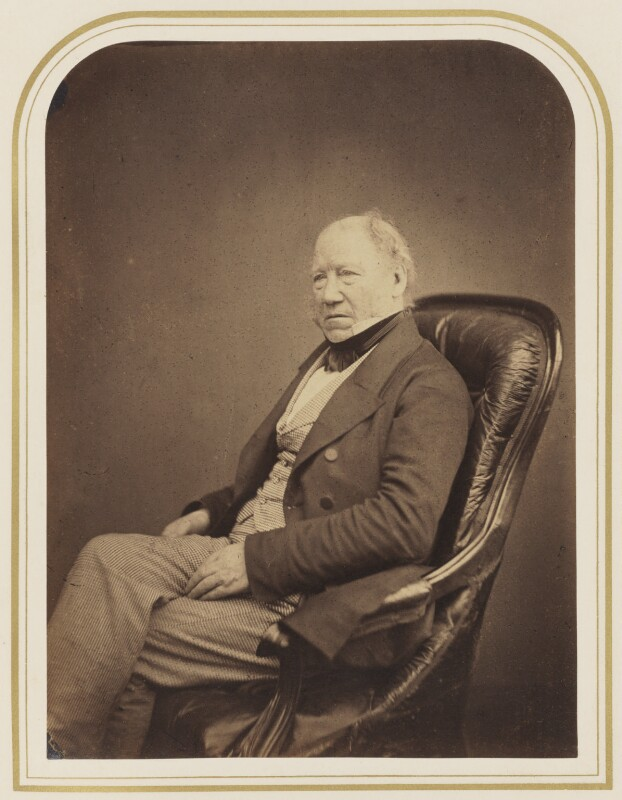
William Henry Smyth in 1855

An 1818 watercolour portrait by James Green exists, but an 1861 portrait in oils by E. E. Eddis of him and his wife cataloguing the Duke of Northumberland's numismatic collection was destroyed during the London blitz.

== Publications ==
- Memoir Descriptive of the Resources, Inhabitants, and Hydrography of Sicily and Its Islands, Interspersed With Antiquarian and Other Notices (1824)
- Sketch of the Present State of the Island of Sardinia (1828, reprinted 2009)
- The Life and Services of Captain Philip Beaver (1829)
- Descriptive Catalogue of a Cabinet of Roman Imperial Large-brass Medals (1834)
- Voyages up the Mediterranean and in the Indian Seas; with memoirs, compiled from the logs and letters of W. Robinson, a Midshipman. Revised by W. H. Smyth (1837)
- Address to the Royal Geographical Society of London: delivered at the anniversary meeting on 27 May (1850)
- A Cycle of Celestial Objects, for the use of naval, military and private astronomers, observed, reduced and discussed by Captain W. H. Smyth (1844) Volume 1; Volume 2.
- Aedes Hartwellianae, or notices of the Manor and Mansion of Hartwell (1851)
- Address to the Royal Geographical Society of London; delivered at the anniversary meeting on 26 May 1851 (1851)
- The Mediterranean: a Memoir Physical Historical and Nautical (1854, reprinted 2000)
- Popular Astronomy ... by Dominique Francois Jean Arago, translated and edited by Admiral W. H. Smyth and R. Grant (1855)
- Descriptive Catalogue of a cabinet of Roman Family Coins belonging to His Grace the Duke of Northumberland (1856)
- Lines written on reading verses of Rear-Admiral W. H. Smyth (1857)
- History of the New World (1857) by Girolamo Benzoni, translated by W. H. Smyth
- Biographies of Distinguished Scientific Men by Dominique Francois Jean Arago, translated by W. H. Smyth, the Rev. Baden Powell and R. Grant, (1857)
- The Cycle of Celestial Objects continued at the Hartwell Observatory to 1859. With a notice of recent discoveries, including details from the Ædes Hartwellianae (1860)
- An Additional Word on the pristine establishment of the Royal Society Club (1861)
- Synopsis of the published and privately-printed works by Admiral W. H. Smyth (1864)
- Addenda to the Ædes Hartwellianæ (1864)
- Nautical Terms – The Sailor's Word-Book (1867)
- Sidereal Chromatics: Being a Re-Print, with Additions from the Bedford Cycle of Celestial Objects and its Hartwell Continuation on the Colours of Multiple Stars (Re-printed 2010. ISBN 9781108015172)
