= James Worsdale =

English painter

James Worsdale (c. 1692 – 10 June 1767) was an Irish and English portrait painter, actor, literary fraud, and libertine whose lively conversation, wit, and boldness allowed him to move among the highest circles of literary life. His skills as a painter are not widely praised by art historians, but his confidence and assertiveness secured him numerous commissions for portraits.

== Early life ==
Worsdale was born in poverty. His father was a pigment grinder, and James began work as an apprentice to leading portraitist Godfrey Kneller. However, Kneller fired Worsdale for secretly marrying his niece. Worsdale would claim to be Kneller's son-in-law, then Kneller's actual son, but these were impositions.

== Career ==
In 1734 he must have been moving in literary circles, because he painted the portraits of Thomas Southerne and Beau Nash. In 1735, he moved to Dublin, Ireland and became the confidant and companion of Richard Parsons, 1st Earl of Rosse and Lord Blayney. The three of them formed the Hellfire Club, Dublin. Worsdale also helped form the Hell Fire Club of Limerick. He began "writing" plays and acting in them in Dublin at this time, if not earlier. He acted with the company of Smock Alley from 1737 to 1740, with the only documented performance being as Lady Scardale in his own play, The Assembly. From 1740 to 1744, he acted with the Aungier Street company, and he was made a deputy Master of the Revels in Ireland in 1741. He appeared as the queen in his The Queen of Spain in 1744 and as Manly in his Cure for a Scold (written in 1735 from Shakespeare's Taming of the Shrew). He was (from 1733) an acquaintance of Matthew and Laetitia Pilkington, and Laetitia wrote a fiery prologue for Cure for a Scold.

He moved to London off and on, where he remained in the company of Matthew Pilkington and continued to act and paint portraits for substantial commissions. In 1752 he appeared, again as a woman, as Lady Pentweazle in Taste and received the third night author's benefit. In reality, his literary productions were generally not his own. Rather, he purchased them from needy authors, including Henry Carey. Worsdale appeared on the stage with numerous ballad operas and operas, as well as poems (many of which Laetitia Pilkington sold to him). The Extravagant Justice and Gasconado the Great were two of "his" operas in 1759.

== Death ==
He died in London on 19 June 1767, aged 75, and was buried in St. Paul's, Covent Garden On his tombstone was inscribed his epitaph, written by himself:

Eager to get, but not to keep, the pelf,
A friend to all mankind except himself.

In his will, Worsdale left money to five acknowledged bastards, as well as to a lady to give her independence from her husband. He had, throughout his adult life, been as flamboyantly philandering as he could and had enjoyed his reputation as a rake. Laetitia Pilkington's Memoir gives a scathing account of him, and other memoirists record him as a short, unseemly man whose whole skill was in pretence and bravado.

== Legacy ==
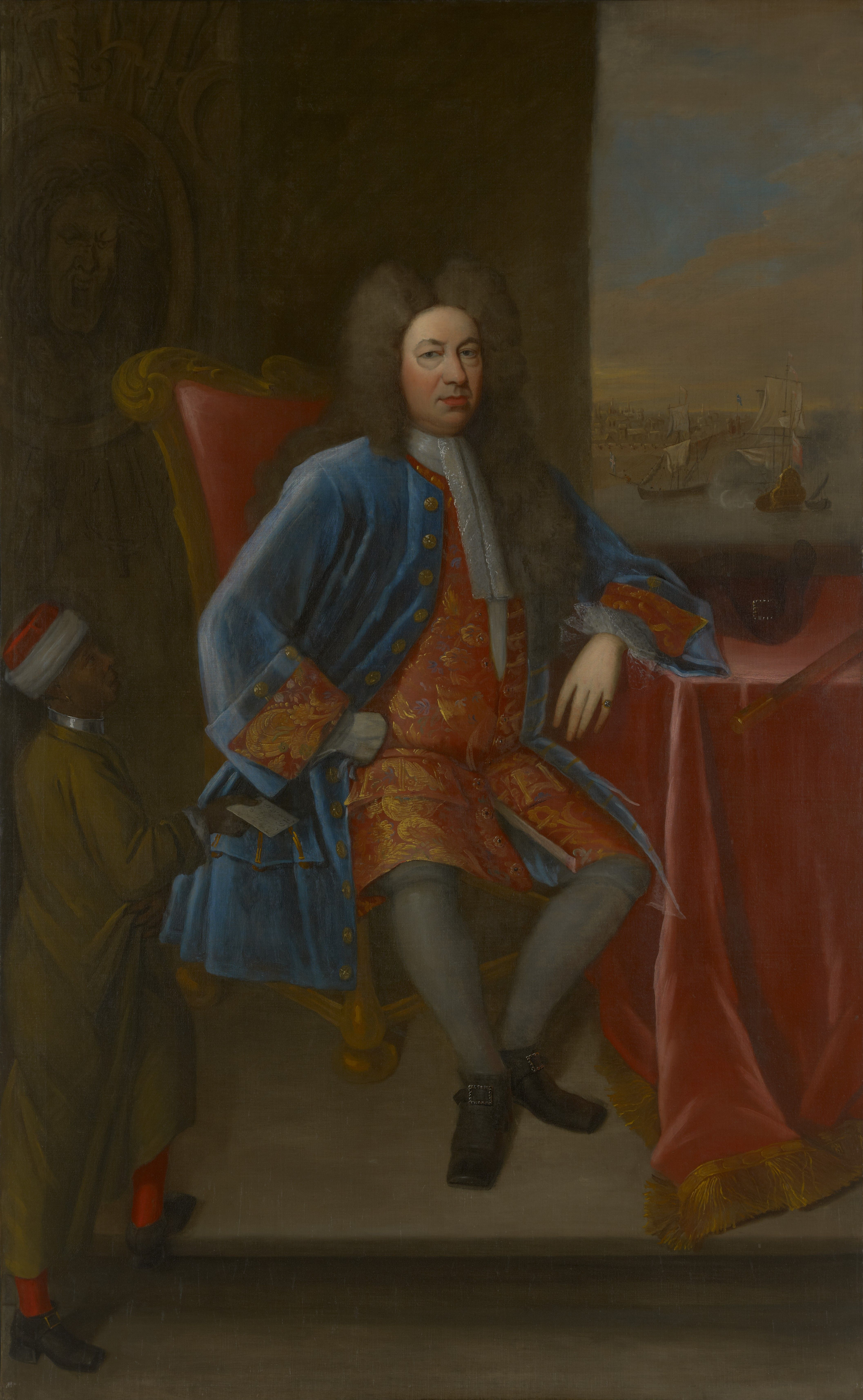
Portrait of Yale University founder Elihu Yale

Worsdale's portraits are stored at Irish National Gallery. Author David Ryan visited the vaults of the National Gallery of Ireland to view Worsdale's "striking 'conversation piece' portraits of the Dublin and Limerick Hellfire Clubs" as part of his research for his book on the Irish Hellfire clubs.
