= Rebecca Pritchard Mills and Her Daughter Eliza Shrewsbury =

18th-century American portrait painting

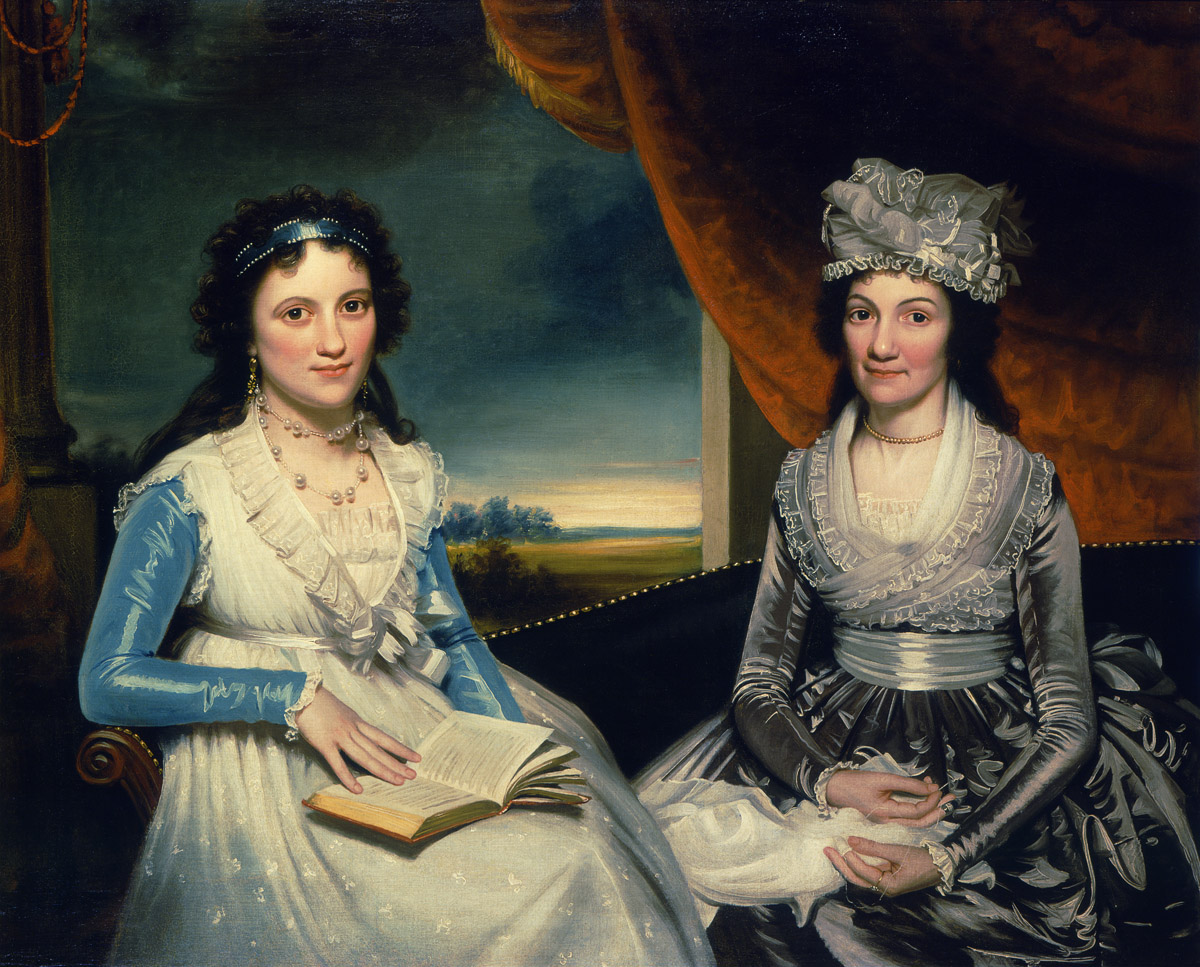
- Artist: James Earl
- Year: 1794
- Catalogue: 1960.0554
- Medium: Oil on canvas
- Dimensions: 101.75 cm × 127.94 cm (40.06 in × 50.37 in)
- Location: Winterthur Museum, Garden and Library, Winterthur, Delaware

Rebecca Pritchard Mills (Mrs. William Mills) and Her Daughter Eliza Shrewsbury is an oil-on-canvas portrait created by American painter James Earl. It was painted in Charleston, South Carolina, in 1794 (possibly as late as 1796). A bequest of Henry Francis du Pont, the painting is held in the permanent collection of the Winterthur Museum, Garden and Library.

== Subjects ==
Born Rebecca Pritchard, the mother had married wealthy shipwright Edward Shrewsbury of Charleston and produced one child, Eliza. Shrewsbury died in 1793, and his widow remarried to wealthy tailor William Mills of Charleston in February 1795. Earl probably painted Rebecca on the occasion of her second marriage between 1794 (when Earl arrived in Charleston) and August 1796 (when Earl died of yellow fever). Eliza Shrewsbury had married wealthy merchant Isham Williams in 1786.

The portrait bears a striking resemblance to Earl's Elizabeth Fales Paine and Her Aunt, painted at about the same time. The Paines lived two blocks away from the Pritchards, moved in the same circles, and shared business dealings.

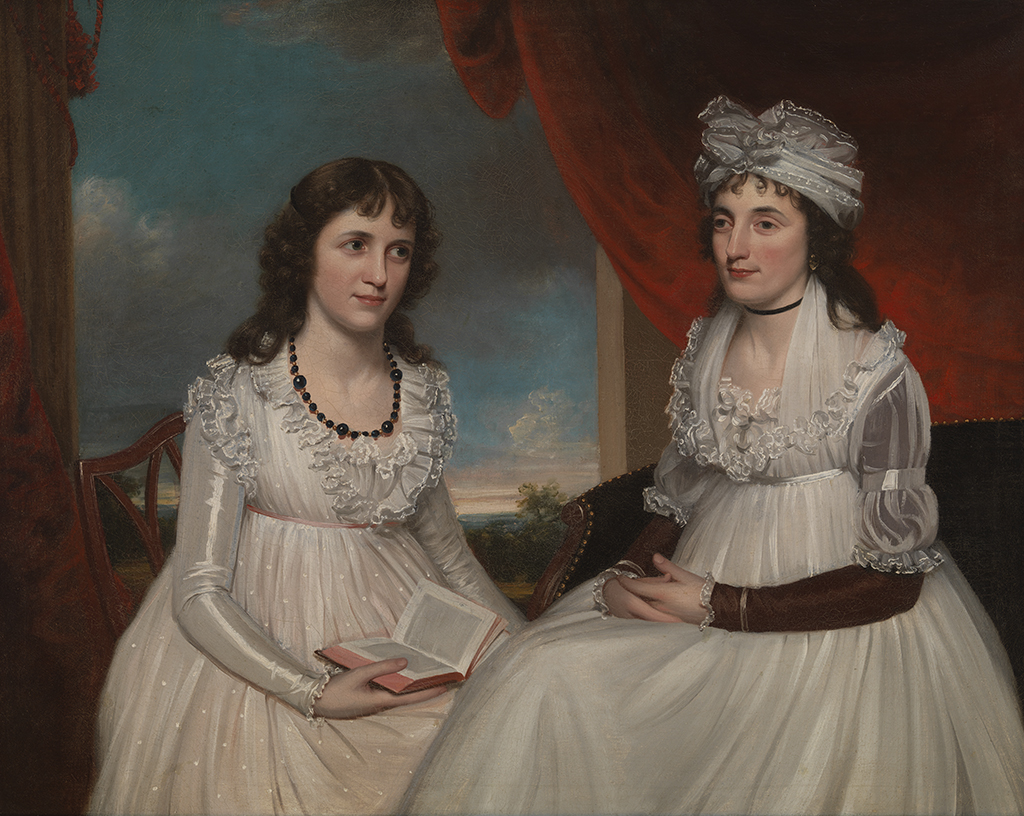
Portrait of Elisabeth Fales Paine and Her Aunt by James Earl

== Description ==
This double portrait depicts Rebecca Pritchard Mills (the sister of Eliza Anne Pritchard, whom Henry Benbridge had painted twenty years earlier) and her daughter, Eliza Shrewsbury (seated at left), captured in the domestic acts of sewing and reading, respectively. The portrait showcases Earl's penchant for rich drapery and (for the period) animated expressions.

Curator Morgan Lan described this portrait as "one of Earl’s most luminous and eye-catching works: a sumptuous display of rich fabric, genteel refinement, and graceful disposition." The painting features two brunette women seated at similar scale before drawn drapes that open onto a landscape of cloudy sky and marsh with distant green vegetation and an even more distant body of water. The women sit together on a black horsehair sofa, pausing their work to glance up at the viewer.

== Analysis ==
The influence of Joshua Reynolds and John Singleton Copley is evident in this portrait. Earl follows English painting conventions, featuring classical and theatrical elements, indeterminate background landscape, and tempestuous sky, but his richly textured materials and saturated colors are reminscient of Copley and other American artists.
