= Warington Wilkinson Smyth =

British geologist

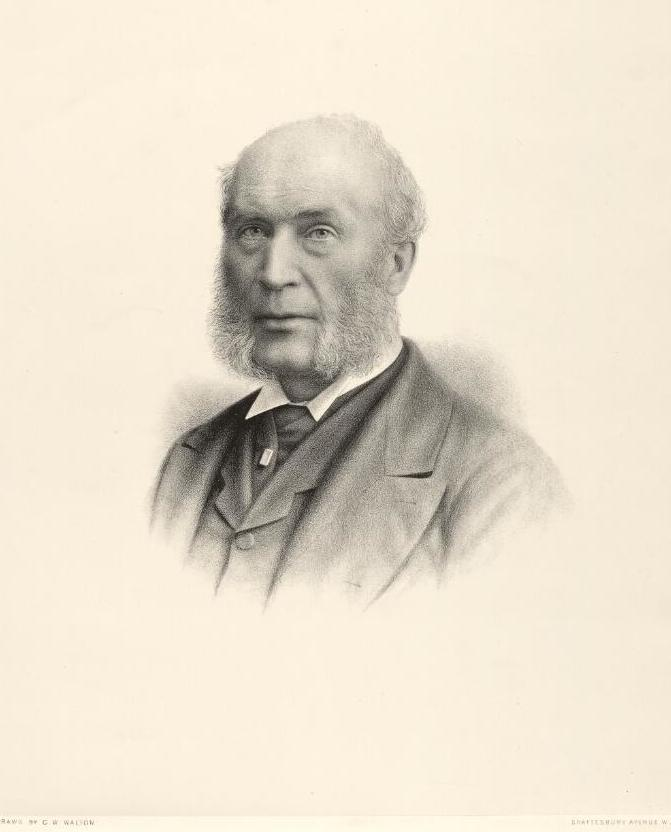
- Portrait of Sir Warington Wilkinson Smyth
- Born: 26 August 1817; Naples
- Died: 19 June 1890 (aged 72); Bayswater, London
- Education: Trinity College, Cambridge
- Spouse: Anna Maria Antonia Maskelyne (m. 1864)
- Children: Herbert Warington Smyth; Nevill Smyth
- Father: William Henry Smyth
- Scientific career
- Fields: Geology
- Workplaces: British Geological Survey; Royal School of Mines; Commissioners of Woods and Forests; Duchy of Cornwall

Sir Warington Wilkinson Smyth FRS FGS (26 August 1817 – 19 June 1890) was a British geologist.

== Biography ==
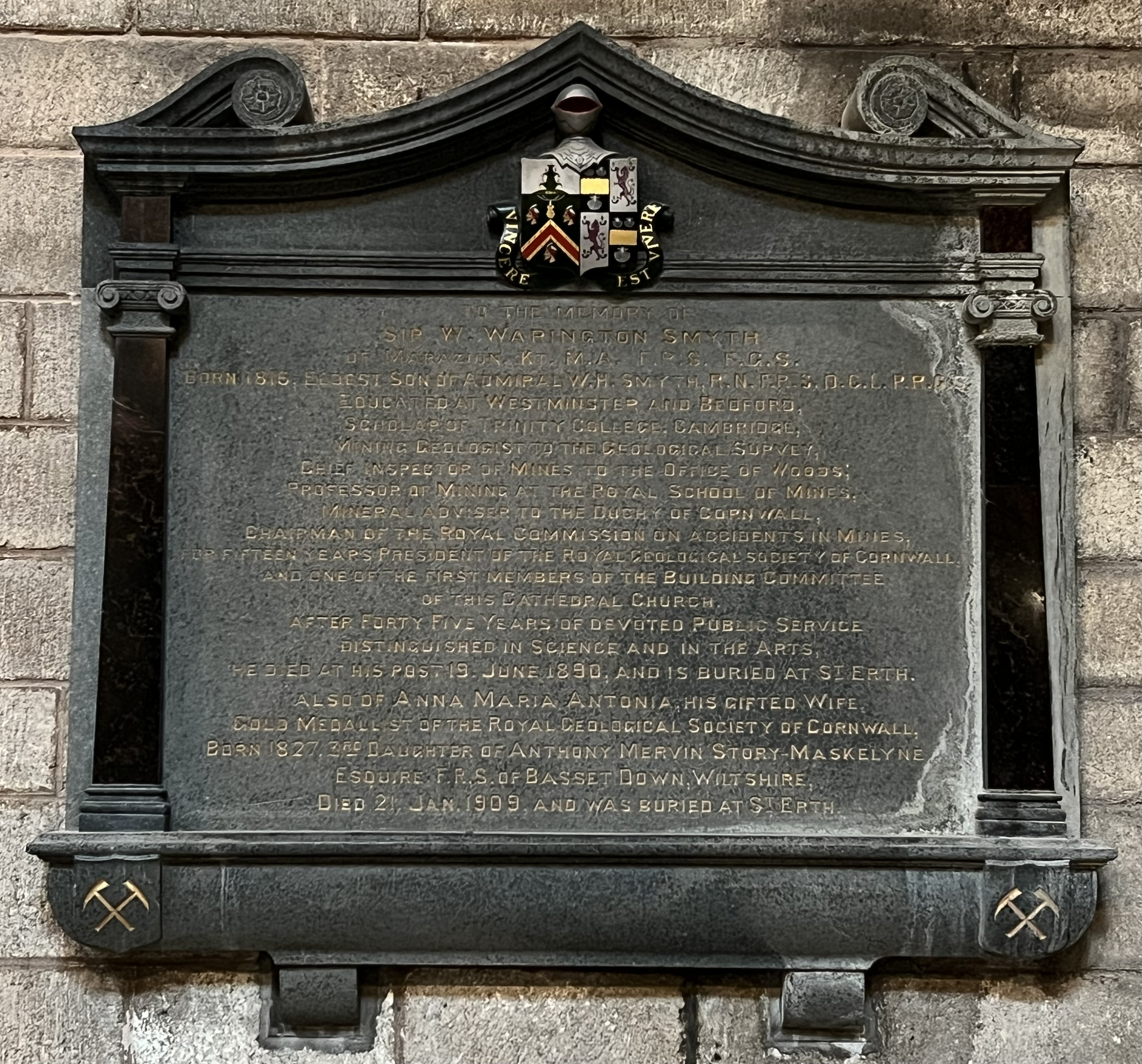
Memorial in Truro Cathedral

Smyth was born at Naples, the son of Admiral W H Smyth and his wife Annarella Warington. His father was engaged in the Admiralty Survey of the Mediterranean at the time of his birth. Smyth was educated at Westminster School and Bedford School. He then went to Trinity College, Cambridge, where he was a member of the Cambridge crew in the 1839 Boat Race and graduated BA in 1839. Having gained a travelling scholarship he spent more than four years in Europe, Asia Minor, Syria and Egypt, paying great attention to mineralogy and mining, examining coal-fields, metalliferous mines and salt-works, and making acquaintance with many distinguished geologists and mineralogists.

Smyth married Anna Maria Antonia Maskelyne, daughter of Anthony Mervin Story Maskelyne, of Basset Down House, Wiltshire on 9 April 1864. One son, Herbert Warington Smyth, was also a mining engineer, a traveller, and a Geological Survey adviser to the government of Siam. Another son, Sir Nevill Maskelyne Smyth (1868–1941), won the Victoria Cross at the Battle of Omdurman.

Smyth died in his London home in Inverness Terrace, Bayswater, on 19 June 1890, but was buried at St Erth, not far from his country home, Cliff Cottage at Marazion in Cornwall.

He is commemorated by a wall plaque in Truro Cathedral, where he had been a founding member of the building committee responsible for its construction.

== Geological Survey ==
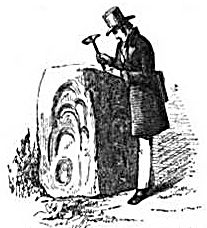
Carreg Pumsaint at Dolaucothi examined by Smyth

On his return to England in 1844 Smyth was appointed mining geologist in the Geological Survey, and in 1851 lecturer at the Royal School of Mines, a post which he held until 1881 when he relinquished the chair of mineralogy but continued as professor of mining. In later years he became chief mineral inspector to the Office of Woods and Forests, and also to the Duchy of Cornwall. He investigated the Roman gold mine at Dolaucothi and published a short paper on his observations in 1846 in Memoirs of the Geological Survey. Subsequently, he gave lectures on gold mining as a result of the then gold rushes in California and Australia in the 1850s.

Smyth was elected fellow of the Royal Society in 1858. He became president of the Geological Society of London in 1866–1868, and in 1879 he was chairman of a Royal Commission appointed to inquire into coal mine accidents, the work in connection with which continued until 1886. He contributed sundry papers to the Memoirs of the Geological Survey, the Quarterly Journal of the Geological Society and the Transactions of the Royal Geological Society of Cornwall, serving as RGSC President from 1871–1879, and again from 1883–1890. He was also author of A Year with the Turks (1854), and of A Treatise on Coal and Coal-mining (1867). He was knighted in 1887. He was also a Knight of the Italian Order of SS. Maurizio and Lazzaro and of the Portuguese Order of Jesus Christ.

== See also ==
- Dolaucothi
- Gold mining
- History of geology
- List of Cambridge University Boat Race crews

== References and sources ==
- A portrait and some reminiscences of W. W. Smyth will be found in Geikie, A. (2011). Memoir of Sir Andrew Crombie Ramsay. Cambridge Library Collection - Earth Science. Cambridge University Press. ISBN 978-1-108-03767-9..
