= Augustus Earle =

English painter (1793–1838)

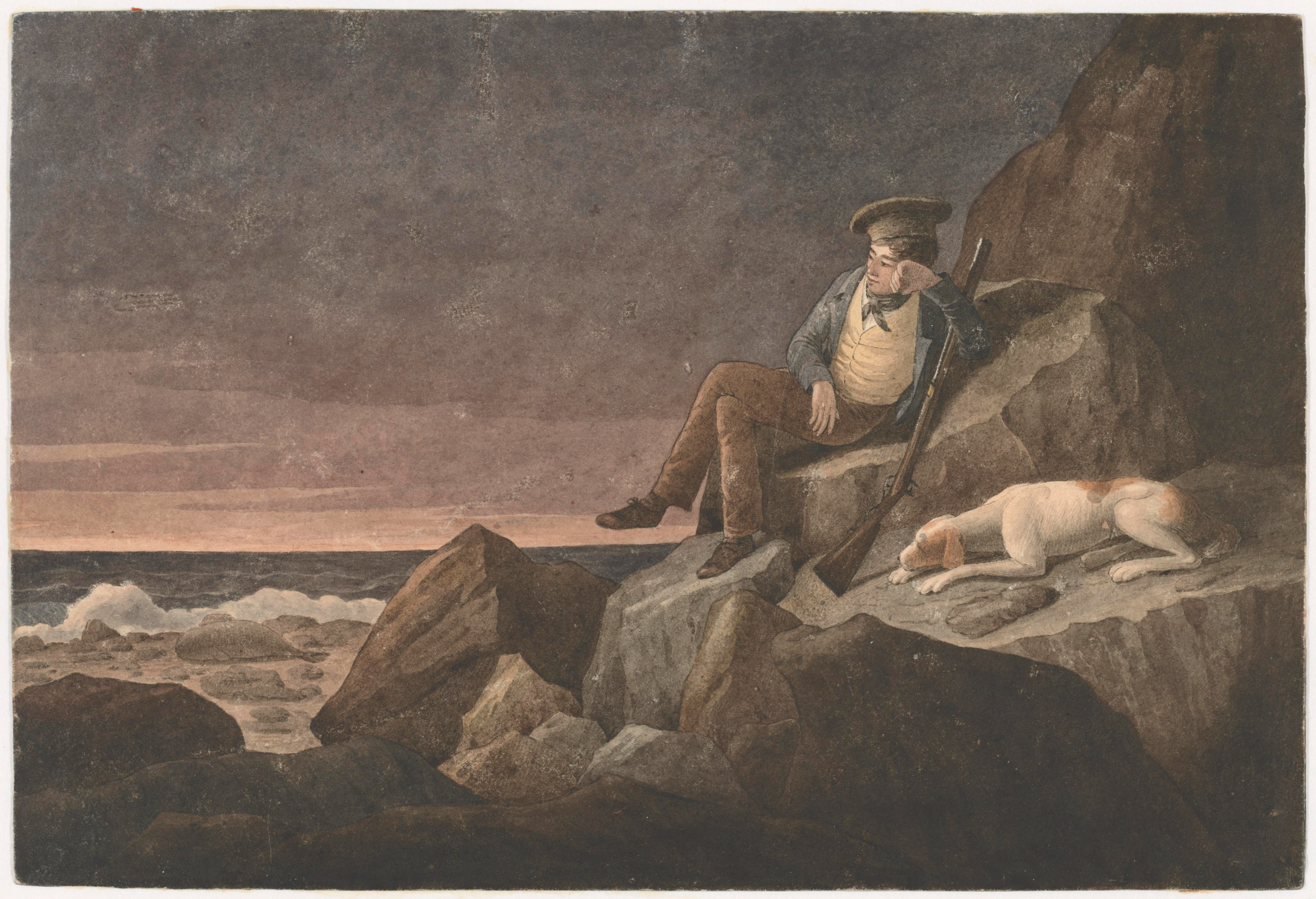
- Solitude, watching the horizon at sunset, in the hopes of seeing a vessel, Tristan de Acunha in the South Atlantic, 1824 self-portrait
- Born: June 1, 1793; London, England, United Kingdom
- Died: December 10, 1838 (aged 45); London, England, United Kingdom
- Education: Royal Academy
- Occupation: Painter
- Years active: 1806–1838
- Relatives: John Carteret Pilkington (grandfather); Phoebe Earle (sister); William Henry Smyth (half-brother)

Augustus Earle (1 June 1793 – 10 December 1838) was an English painter. Unlike earlier artists who worked outside Europe and were employed on voyages of exploration or worked abroad for wealthy, often aristocratic patrons, Earle was able to operate quite independently – able to combine his lust for travel with an ability to earn a living through art. The body of work he produced during his travels comprises a significant documentary record of the effects of European contact and colonisation during the early nineteenth century.

== Life ==
=== Early life ===
Augustus Earle was born in London on 1 June 1793. He was the youngest child of an American-born father, James Earle (1761–1796), an artist, and Georgiana Caroline Smyth, daughter of John Carteret Pilkington and former partner (with two children) of Joseph Brewer Palmer Smyth, an American loyalist who spent some years in England. Earle's father James was a member of the prominent American Earle family. The elder of his two sisters was Phoebe Earle (1790–1863), also a professional painter and wife of the artist Denis Dighton, while his older half-sister was Elizabeth Anne Smyth (1787–1838) and his older half-brother was the scientist Admiral William Henry Smyth (1788–1865). There is no record of him marrying or having children.

Earle received his artistic training in the Royal Academy and was already exhibiting there at the age of 13. Earle exhibited classical, genre and historical paintings in six Royal Academy exhibitions between 1806 and 1814.

=== Mediterranean tour ===
In 1815, at the age of twenty-two, Earle's half-brother, William Henry Smyth had sought and was given permission by Lord Exmouth to allow Earle passage through the Mediterranean aboard Scylla that Smyth commanded and which was part of Admiral Exmouth's Royal Navy fleet. Earle thus visited Sicily, Malta, Gibraltar and North Africa, before returning to England in 1817. A portfolio of drawings from this voyage is held by the National Gallery of Australia, Canberra.

=== To the United States ===
In March 1818, Earle left England, bound for the United States on the first stage of a journey that would end up taking him around-the-world to South America, Tristan da Cunha, New South Wales, New Zealand, the Pacific, Asia, India, Mauritius and St Helena before returning home in late 1829. The first leg of Earle's 1818 voyage took him first to New York, before moving on to Philadelphia, where he exhibited two paintings at the Pennsylvania Academy of Fine Arts. No artworks are known to have survived from this period.

=== South America ===
Continuing his voyage in February 1820, Earle sailed for Rio de Janeiro, Brazil, visiting Chile in June and was resident in Lima, Peru from July to December. On 10 December 1820, Earle left Lima for Rio de Janeiro aboard HMS Hyperion. During the subsequent three years spent in Rio de Janeiro, Earle produced a large number of sketches and watercolours.

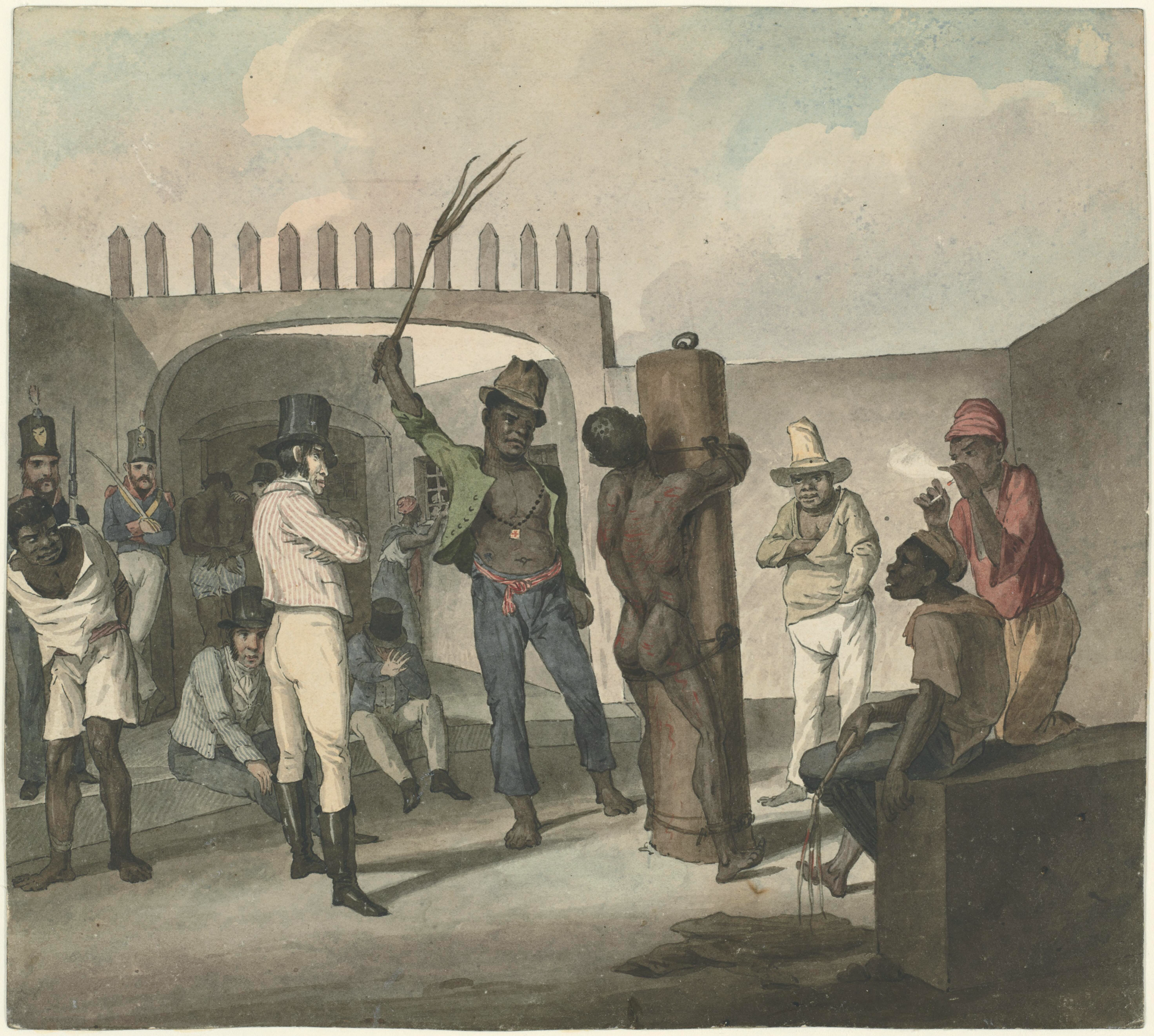
Punishing negroes at Cathabouco, Rio de Janeiro, c. 1822. Watercolour by Augustus Earle in the National Library of Australia

A number of the works produced dealt with the subject of slavery in Brazil, including Punishing negroes at Cathabouco (Calobouco), Rio de Janeiro, Negro fandango scene, Campo St. Anna nr. Rio, and Games at Rio de Janeiro, during the Carnival. Other works included landscapes and a series of portraits.

=== Tristan da Cunha ===
On 17 February 1824, he left Rio de Janeiro aboard the ageing ship Duke of Gloucester bound for the Cape of Good Hope, and onwards to Calcutta. Earle's departure was due to a letter containing the 'most flattering offers of introduction to Lord Amherst, who had just left England to take upon himself the government of India. In the mid-Atlantic storms forced the ship to anchor off the remote island of Tristan da Cunha. During the ship's stay in the island's waters, Earle went ashore with his dog and a crew member, Thomas Gooch, attracted by the idea that 'this was a spot hitherto unvisited by any artist'. Three days later Duke of Gloucester inexplicably set sail, leaving Earle and Gooch on the island, which had only six permanent adult inhabitants. In the ensuing eight months of enforced stay on the island, between March and November, Earle became a tutor to several children, and continued to record impressions of the island until his supplies ran out.

Sixteen works survive from the stay on Tristan da Cunha, including Government House, Tristan D'Acunha (i.e. da Cunha), which was reproduced in his Narrative , and Flinching a young sea elephant.

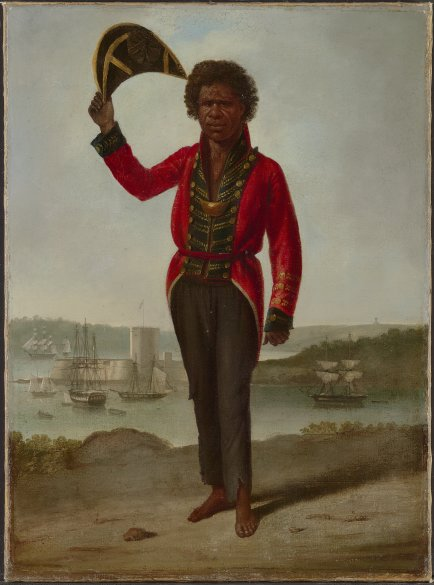
Augustus Earle, Portrait of Bungaree, a native of New South Wales, with Fort Macquarie, Sydney Harbour, in background, (1826): oil on canvas; 68.5 x 50.5 cm. National Library of Australia

=== Australia ===
Earle was finally rescued on 29 November by the ship Admiral Cockburn, which had stopped off on its voyage to Hobart, Van Diemen's Land (in 1856 Van Diemen's Land was renamed Tasmania in honour of Abel Tasman) where he landed on 18 January 1825. He remained in Hobart briefly, and only a small number of works survive from this period, his portraits of Captain Richard Brooks and of his wife (1827_1827)hang in the National Gallery of Victoria, including June Park, Van Dieman's (sic) Land, perfect park scenery, and Cape Barathas, (i.e. Barathus) Adventure Bay, Van Dieman's (i.e. Diemen's) Land.

Earle left Hobart for Sydney aboard the brig Cyprus, arriving there on 14 May. He soon established a reputation as the colony's first and foremost artist of significance. Upon setting up a small business, Earle received a number of requests for portraits. These commissions came from a number of Sydney's establishment figures and leading families. Throughout this time, Earle also continued to produce a number of watercolours which mainly fall into three categories: landscapes, Aboriginal subjects, and a series of views of public and private buildings that record the development of the colony. Earle painted numerous portraits of high-profile colonists including Governor Thomas Brisbane, Governor Ralph Darling, Captain John Piper and Mrs Piper, with her children. One of his most famous works is a lithographic print entitled Portrait of Bungaree, a native of New South Wales, with Fort Macquarie, Sydney Harbour, in background.

Earle also made several excursions to outlying areas of the colony, travelling north of Sydney via the Hunter River as far as Port Stephens and Port Macquarie and, between April and May 1827, he travelled to the Illawarra district south of Sydney. Gaining acceptance within Sydney 'society' he decided to apply for a land grant, this was denied however, due to his lack of capital.

=== New Zealand ===
On 20 October 1827, Earle left Sydney aboard Governor Macquarie to visit New Zealand, where he had 'hopes of finding something new for my pencil in their peculiar and picturesque style of life'. While Earle was preceded by artists on James Cook's voyages in the Pacific, including Sydney Parkinson, William Hodges and John Webber, he was the first to take up residence. Earle arrived at Hokianga Harbour on the west coast of the North Island, resolving to make his way overland to the Bay of Islands. Setting out with his friend Mr Shand he arrived at Kororāreka, where he came under the patronage of Māori chief Te Whareumu, also known as Shulitea [or 'King George']. A large number of watercolours and drawings from Earle's New Zealand sojourn remain, covering subjects such as romantic landscapes, Māori culture and daily village life, the effects of warfare, portrait studies. He also produced a number of oil painting portraits, along with watercolours, lithographs and pencil sketches. Returning to Hokianga Harbour, he departed from New Zealand for Sydney in April 1828 aboard Governor Macquarie.

=== To India ===
Earle then spent close to six months back in Sydney before departing on 12 October 1828, on board the ship Rainbow bound for India via the Caroline Islands, Guam, one of the Ladrones, Manila, Singapore and Pulo-Penang, before disembarking at Madras in India. Although the city of Madras provided a good market for his art Earle's health declined there and he travelled to Pondicherry, embarking in the Julie, which was condemned at Mauritius. After executing panoramic views of the island he returned to England in the Resource in 1830.

=== Voyage of Beagle ===
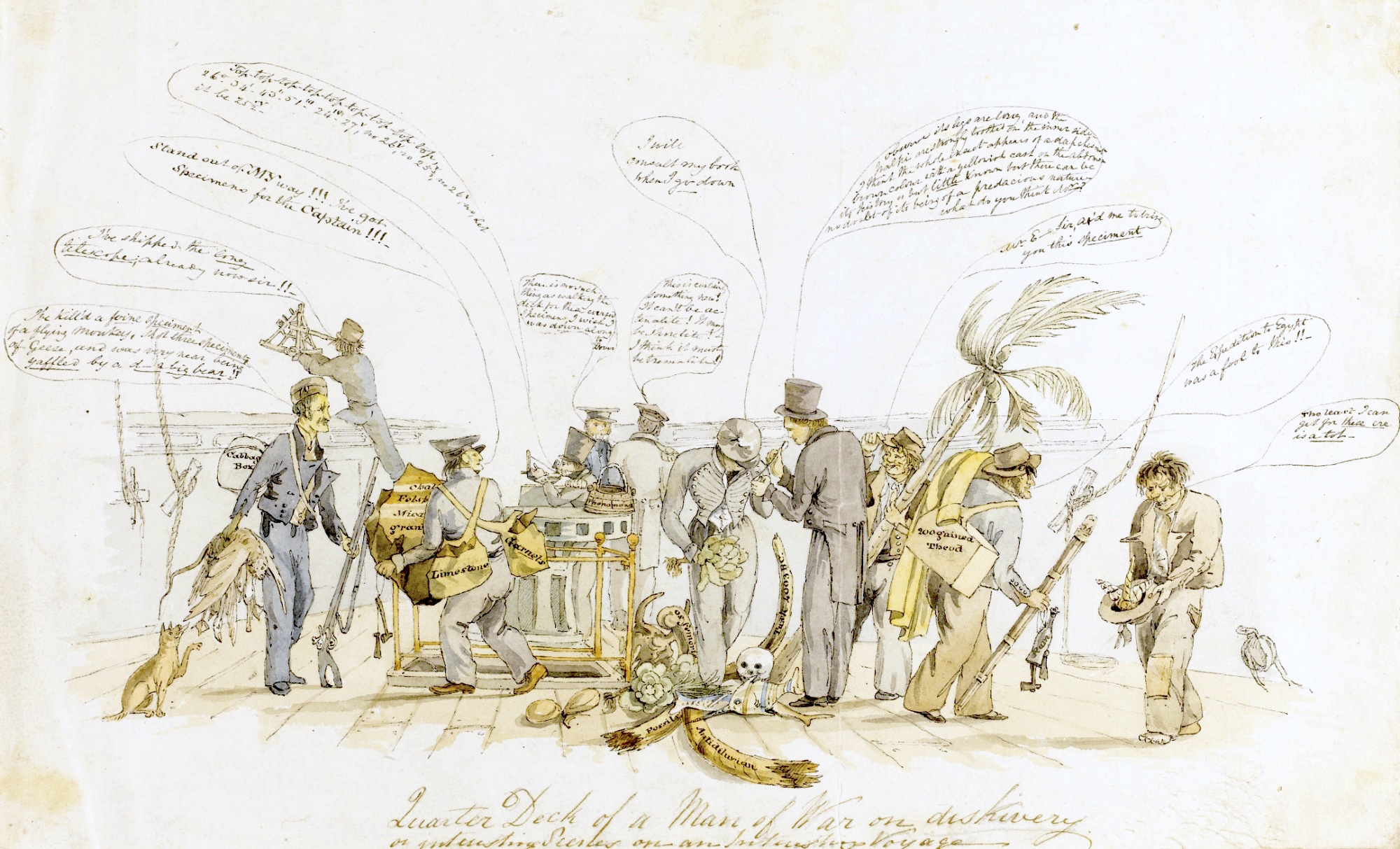
Scene on the quarterdeck of the HMS Beagle painted around 24 September 1832 most likely by Augustus Earle. Charles Darwin is the central figure in a top hat, examining a specimen.

On 28 October 1831 he was engaged by captain Robert FitzRoy as artist supernumerary with victuals on the second voyage of HMS Beagle, working as topographical artist and draughtsman. He became friends with Charles Darwin, and in April and May 1832 they stayed in a cottage at Botafogo near Rio de Janeiro, but problems with his health forced him to leave the ship at Montevideo in August and return to England. His place on HMS Beagle was taken over by Conrad Martens.

He made paintings from some of his sketches, including A Bivouac of Travellers, which he exhibited at the Royal Academy in 1838. This was one of three he made in the Cabbage Tree Forest near Illawarra c. March 1827.

== Death ==
Augustus Earle died, of asthma and debility, in London on 10 December 1838, aged 45.

== Publication ==
- Augustus Earle, A narrative of a nine months' residence in New Zealand in 1827: together with a journal of a residence in Tristan D'Acunha, an island situated between South America and the Cape of Good Hope. London: Longman, Rees, Orme, Brown, Green & Longman, 1832. Full text.

== Gallery ==
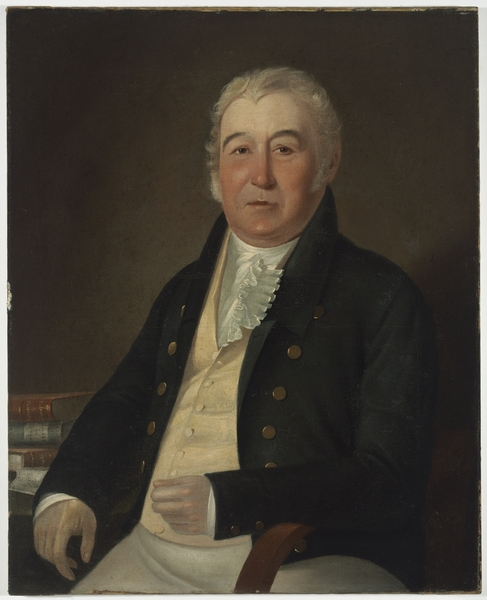
Portrait of Robert Townson, c. 1826

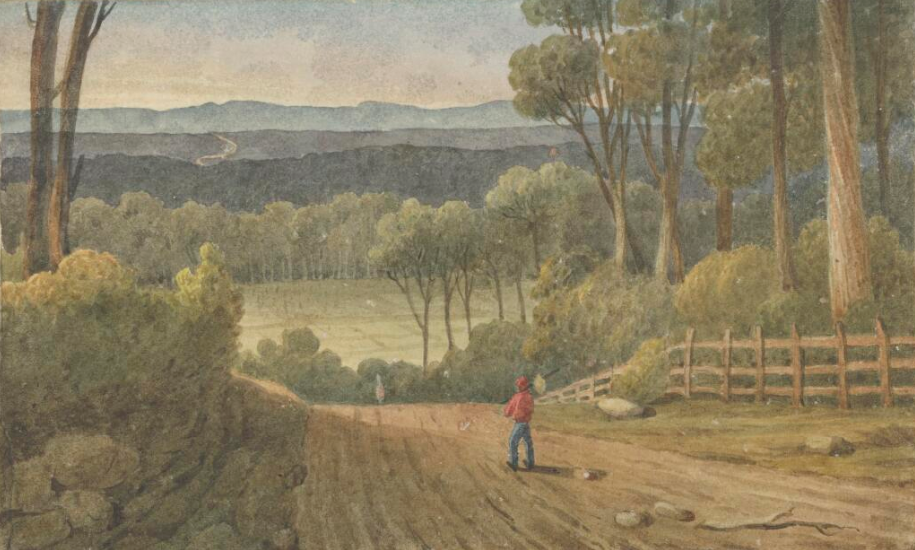
A distant view of the Blue Mountains and Lapston Hill, New South Wales taken from the Emu Plains Road, c. 1826

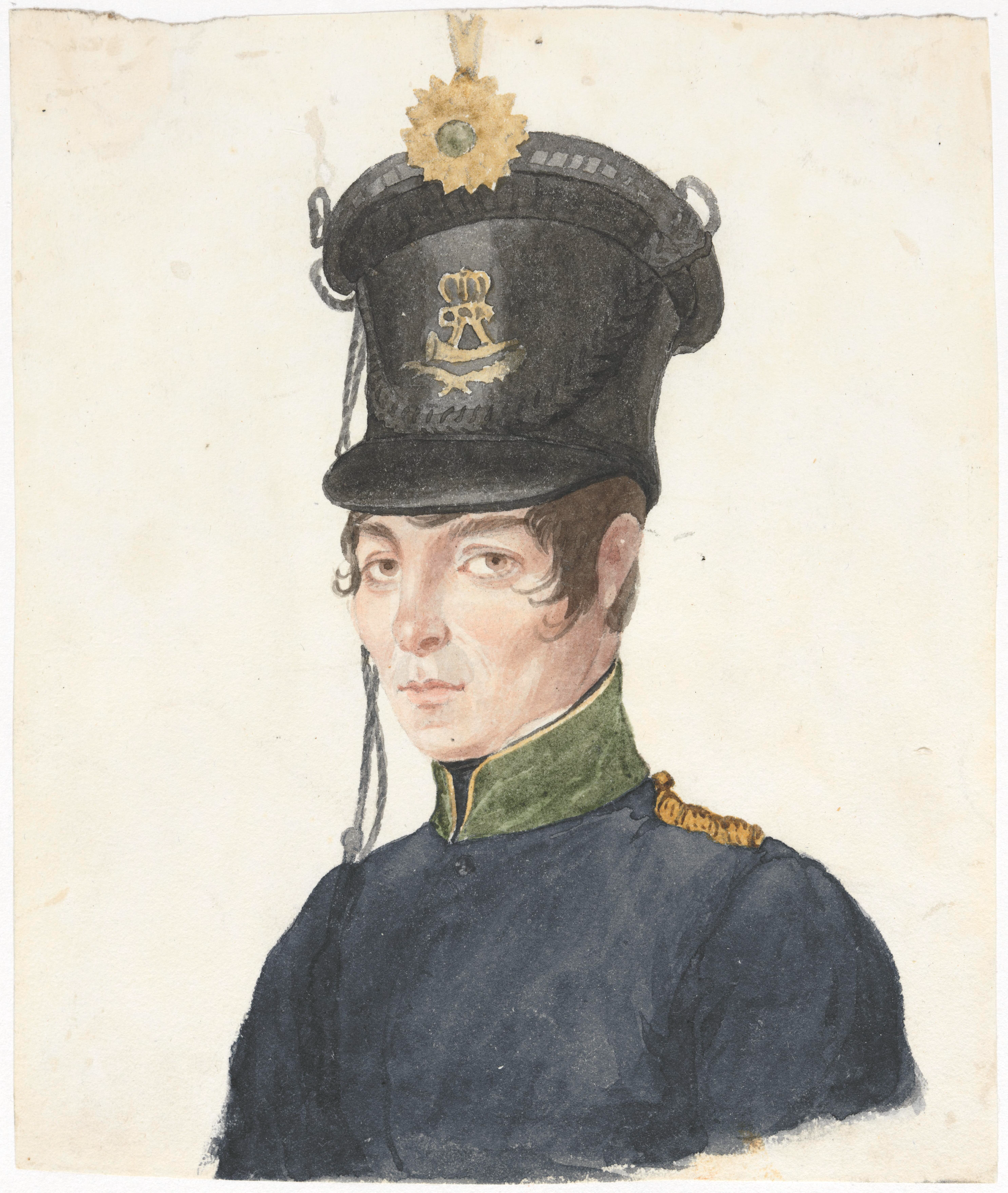
A female soldier of South America, c. 1824, a portrait of Maria Quitéria

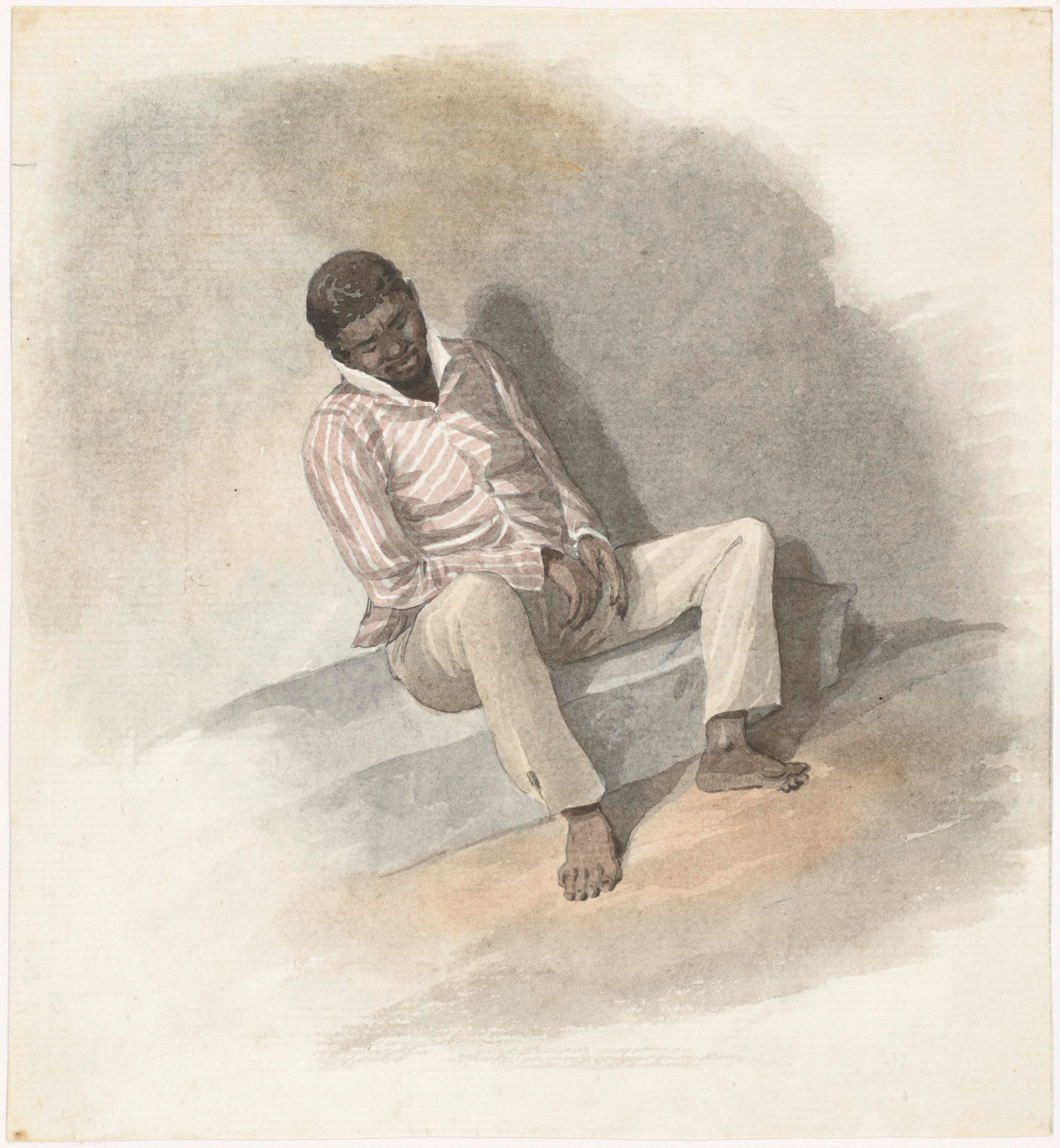
A sleeping negro, Brazils, c. 1822

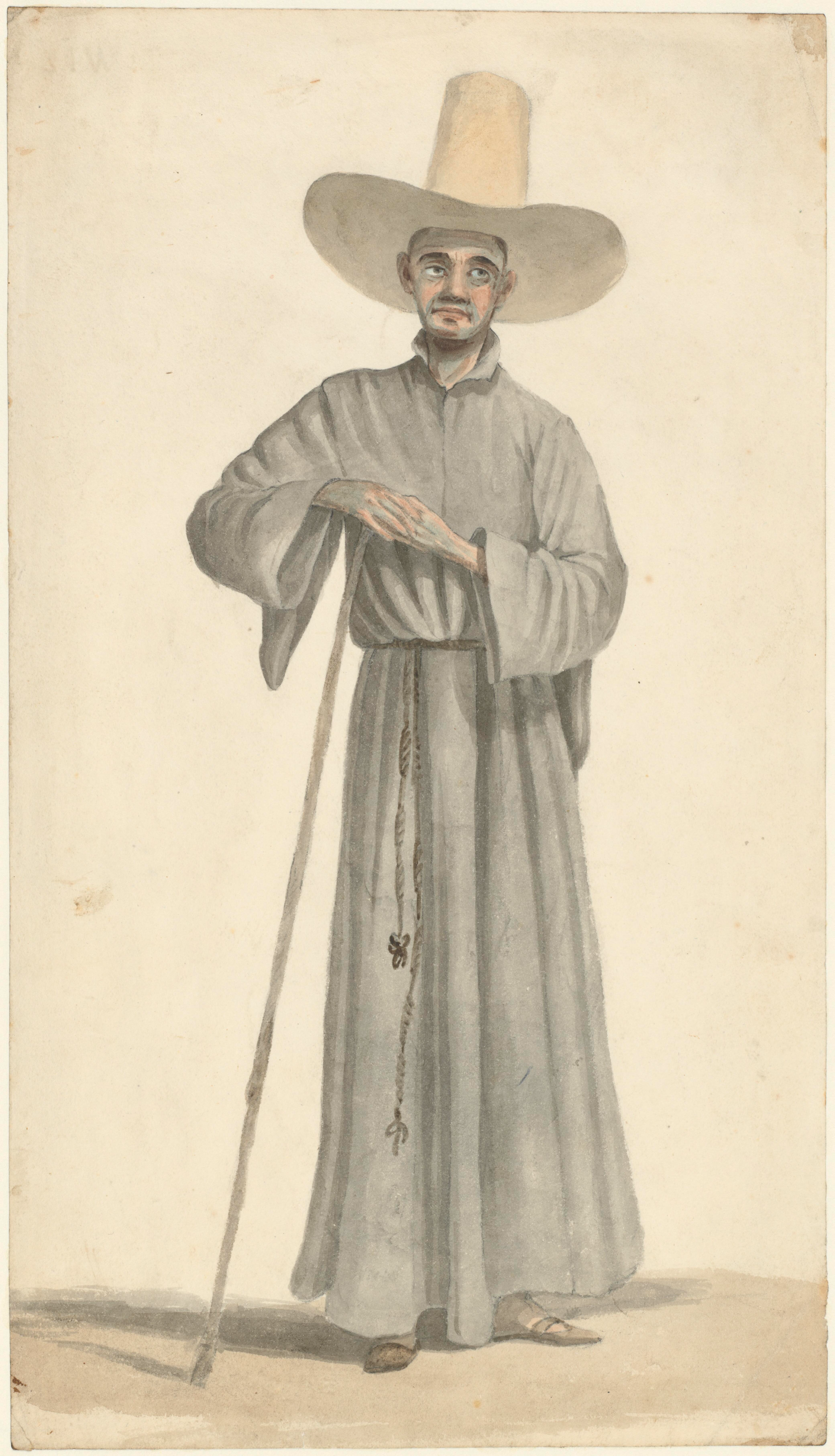
An ecclesiastic of Rio de Janeiro, c. 1822

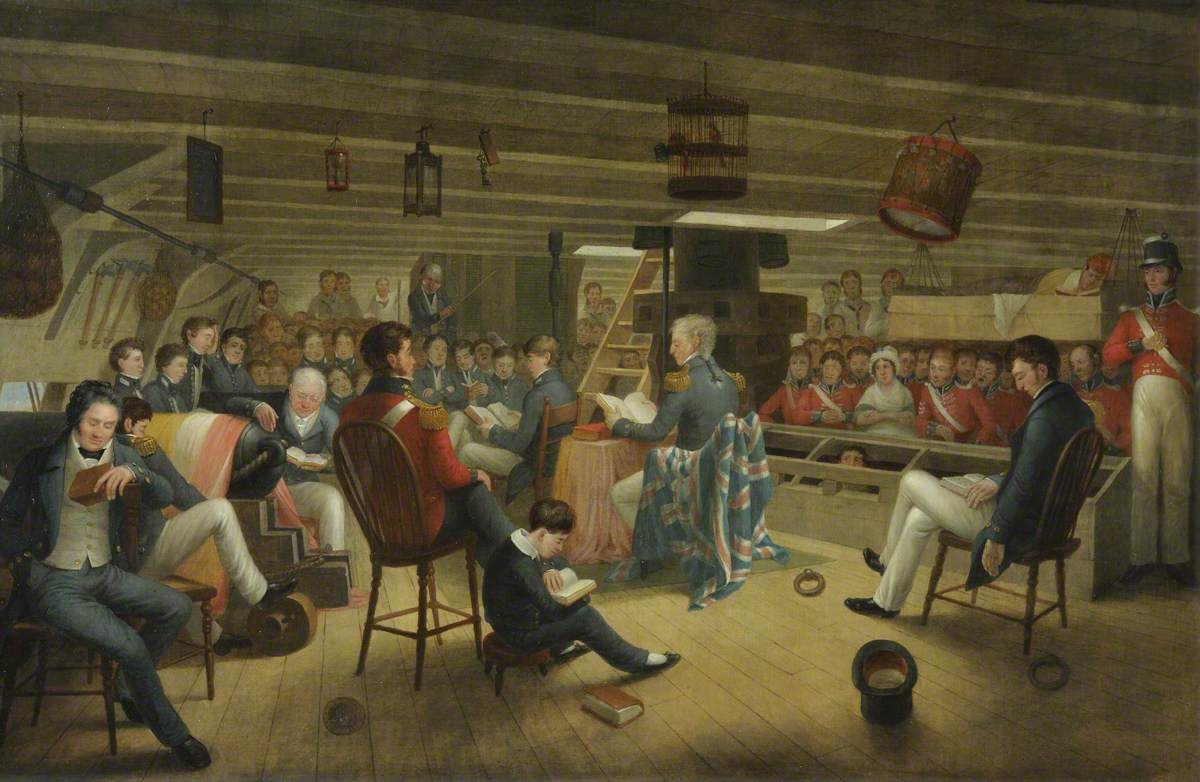
Divine Service as it is Usually Performed on Board a British Frigate at Sea, c. 1836

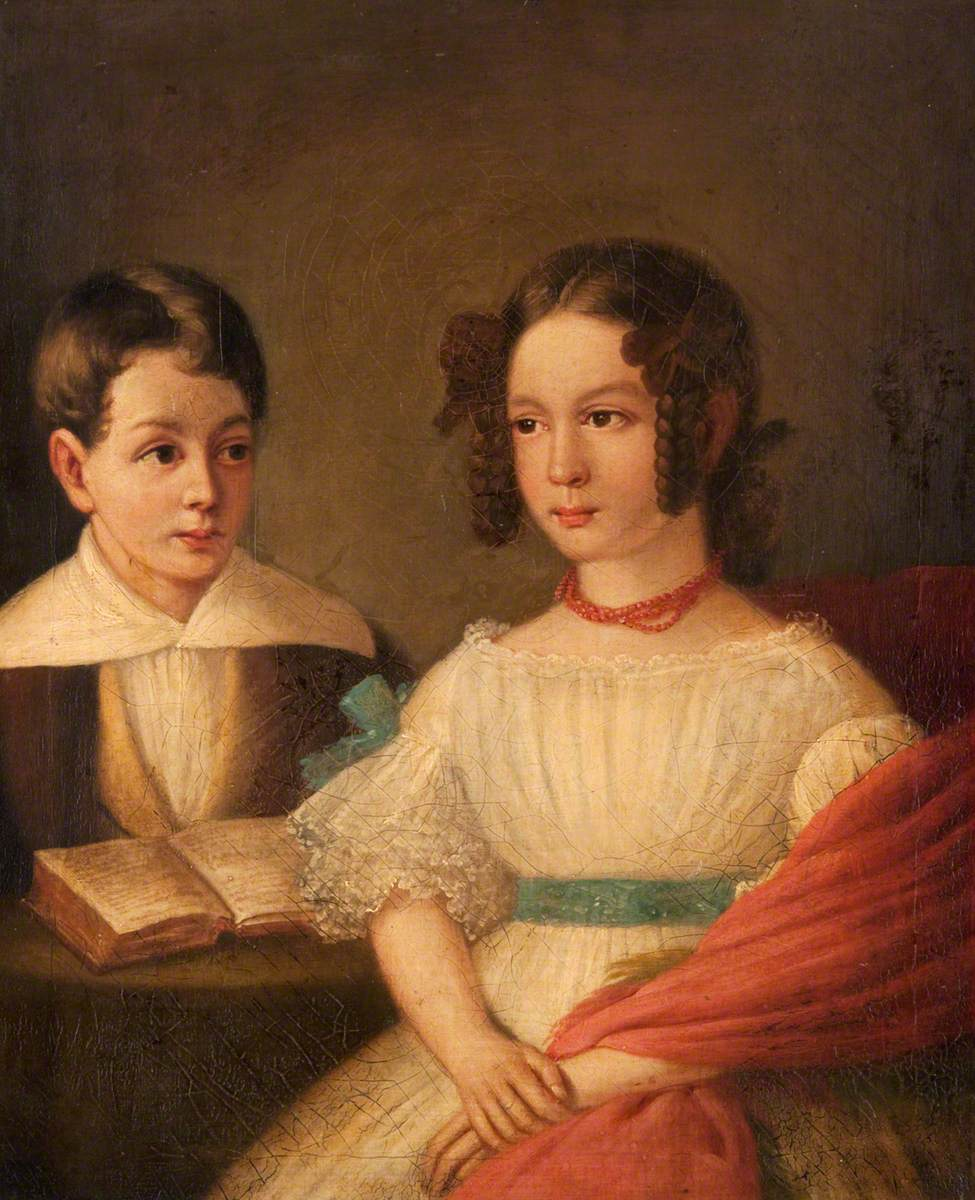
Frances and Algernon Black, 1830s

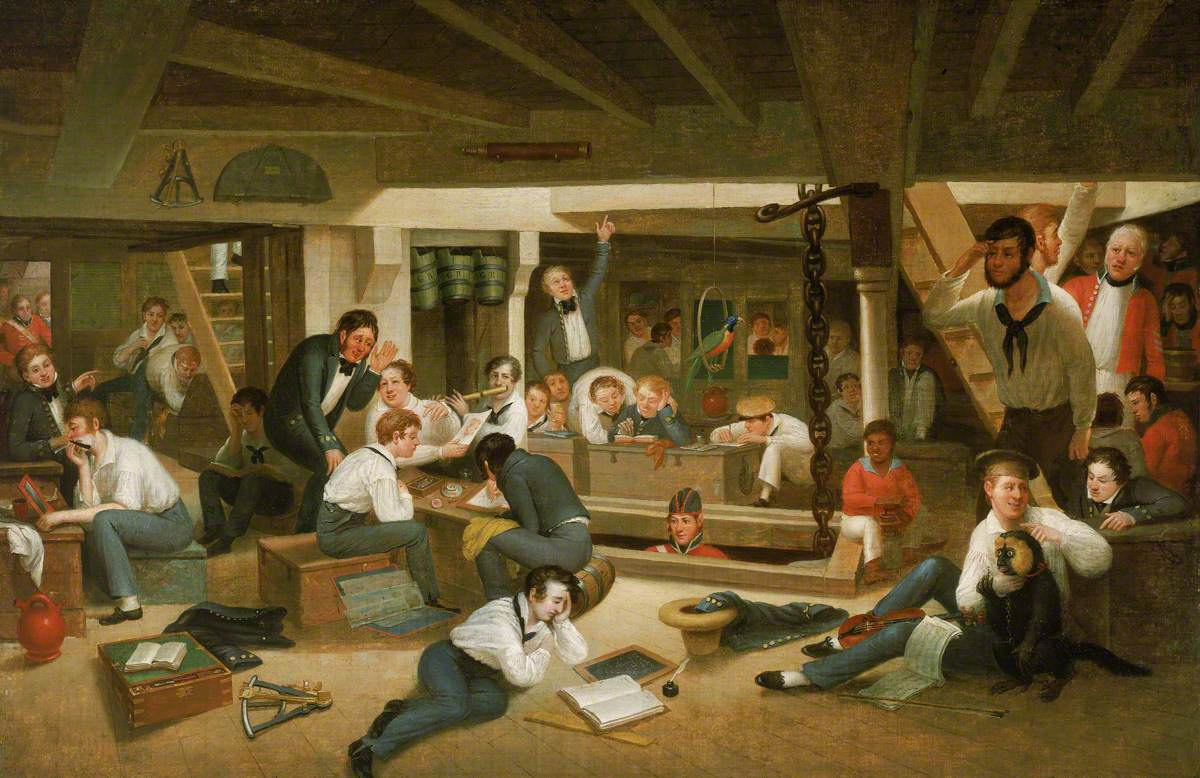
Life in the Ocean Representing the Usual Occupations of the Young Officers in the Steerage of a British Frigate at Sea, c. 1836

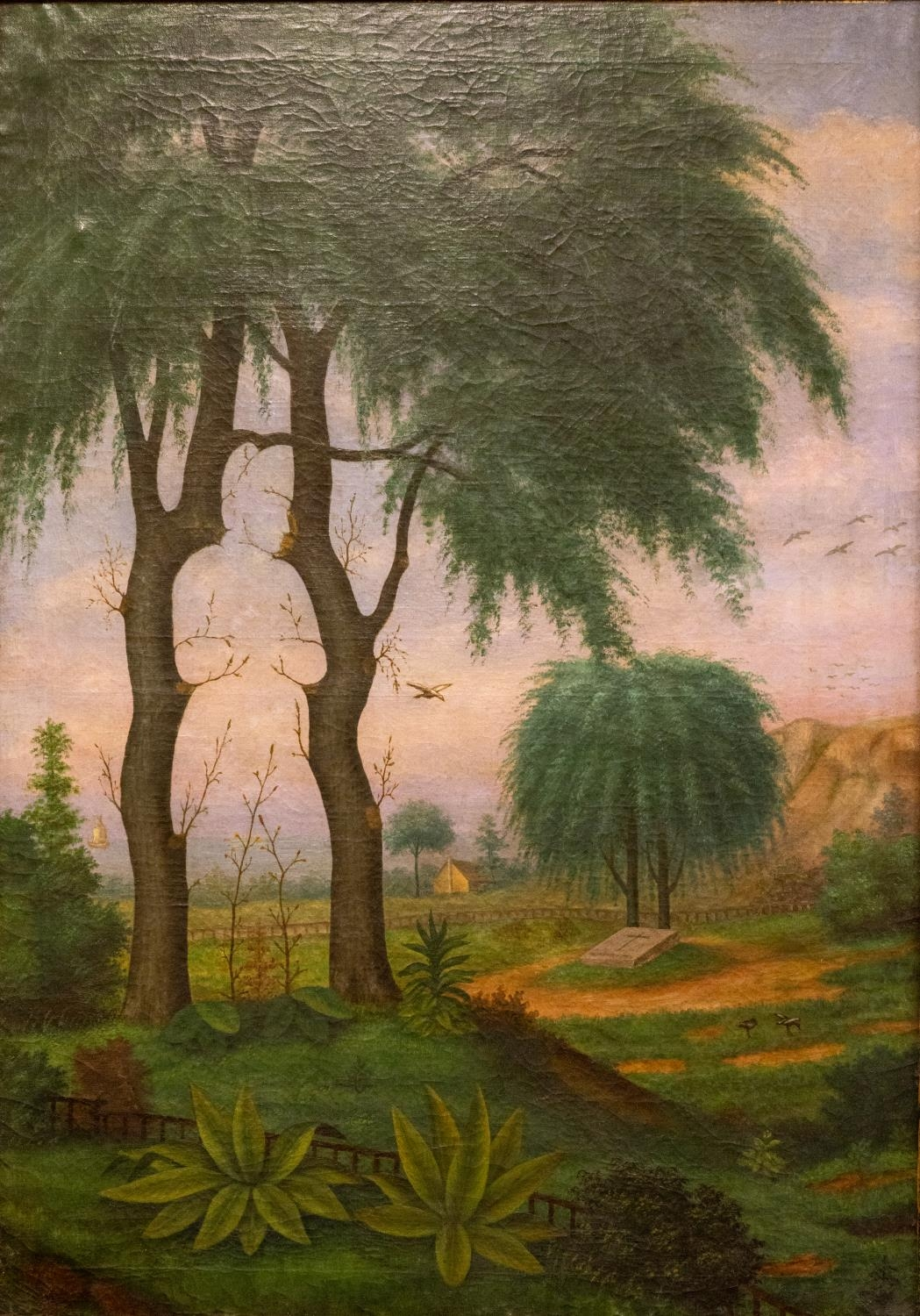
Napoleon's Grave, c. 1829

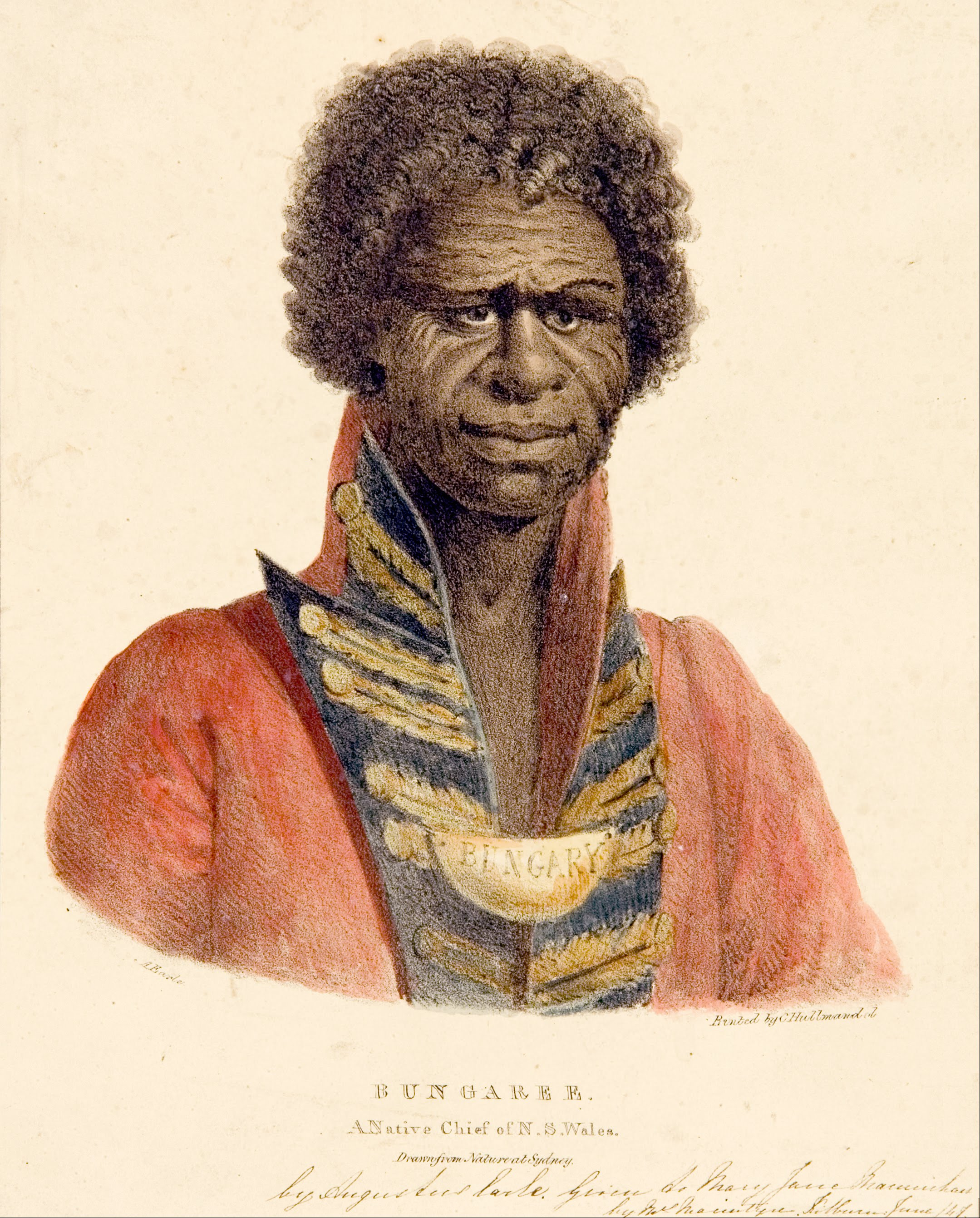
Bungaree: A Native Chief of N.S. Wales, c. 1829-38

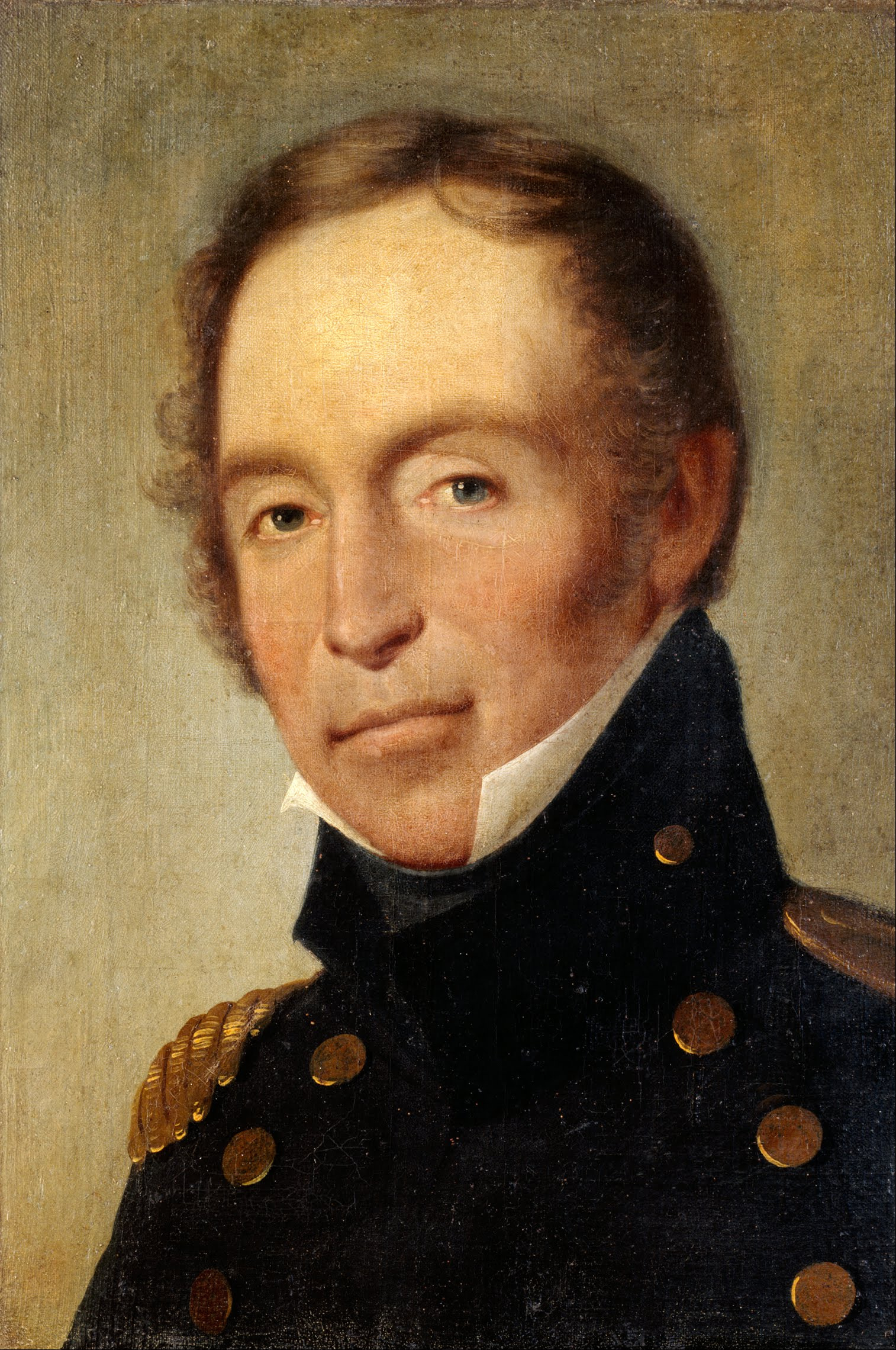
Captain John Piper, 1826

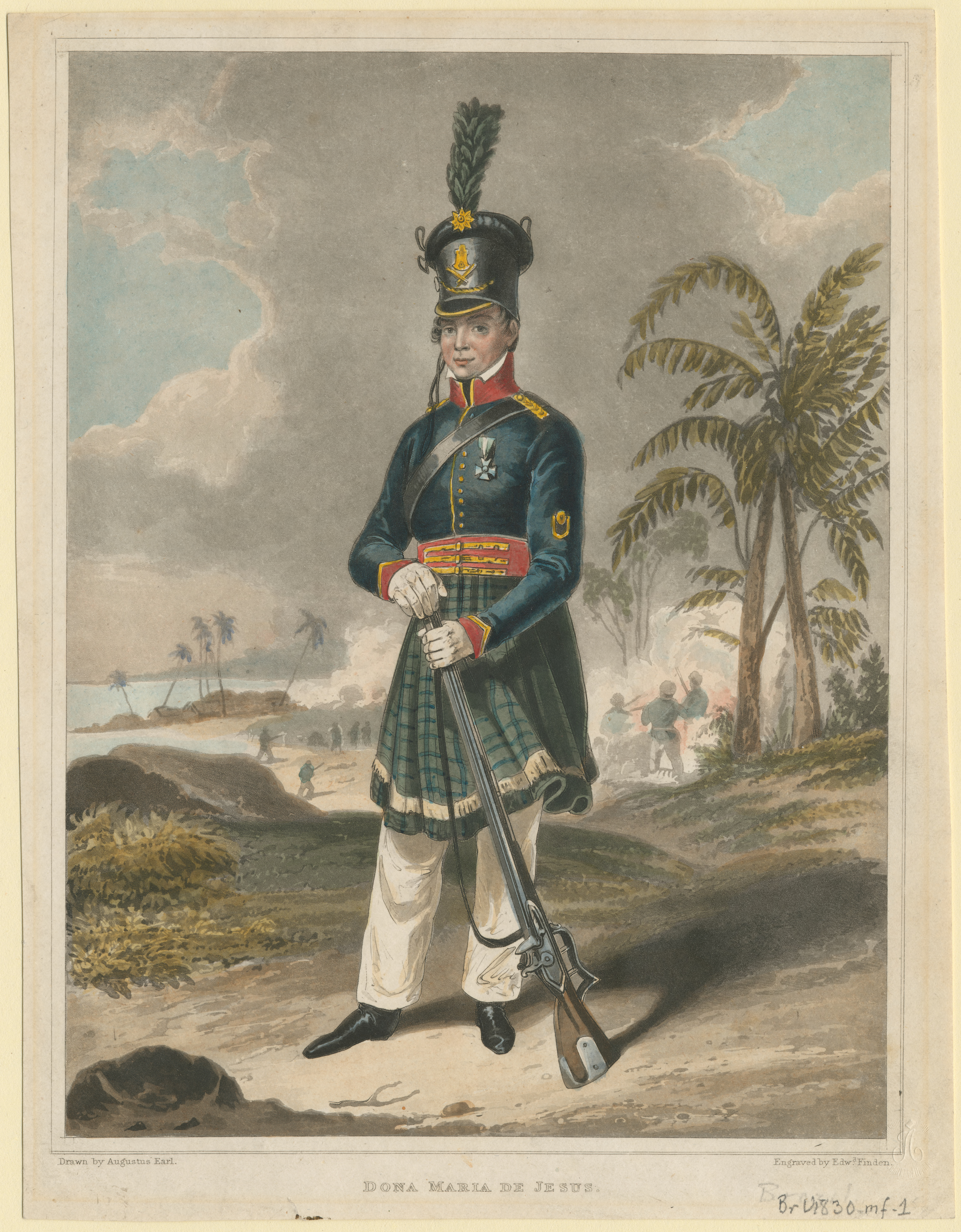
Dona Maria de Jesus, 1830, a portrait of Maria Quitéria

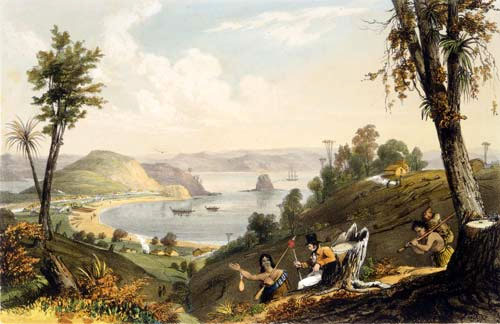
Kororadika Beach, 1838

== See also ==
- List of incidents of cannibalism § 1820s
