= Laetitia Pilkington =

Anglo-Irish poet

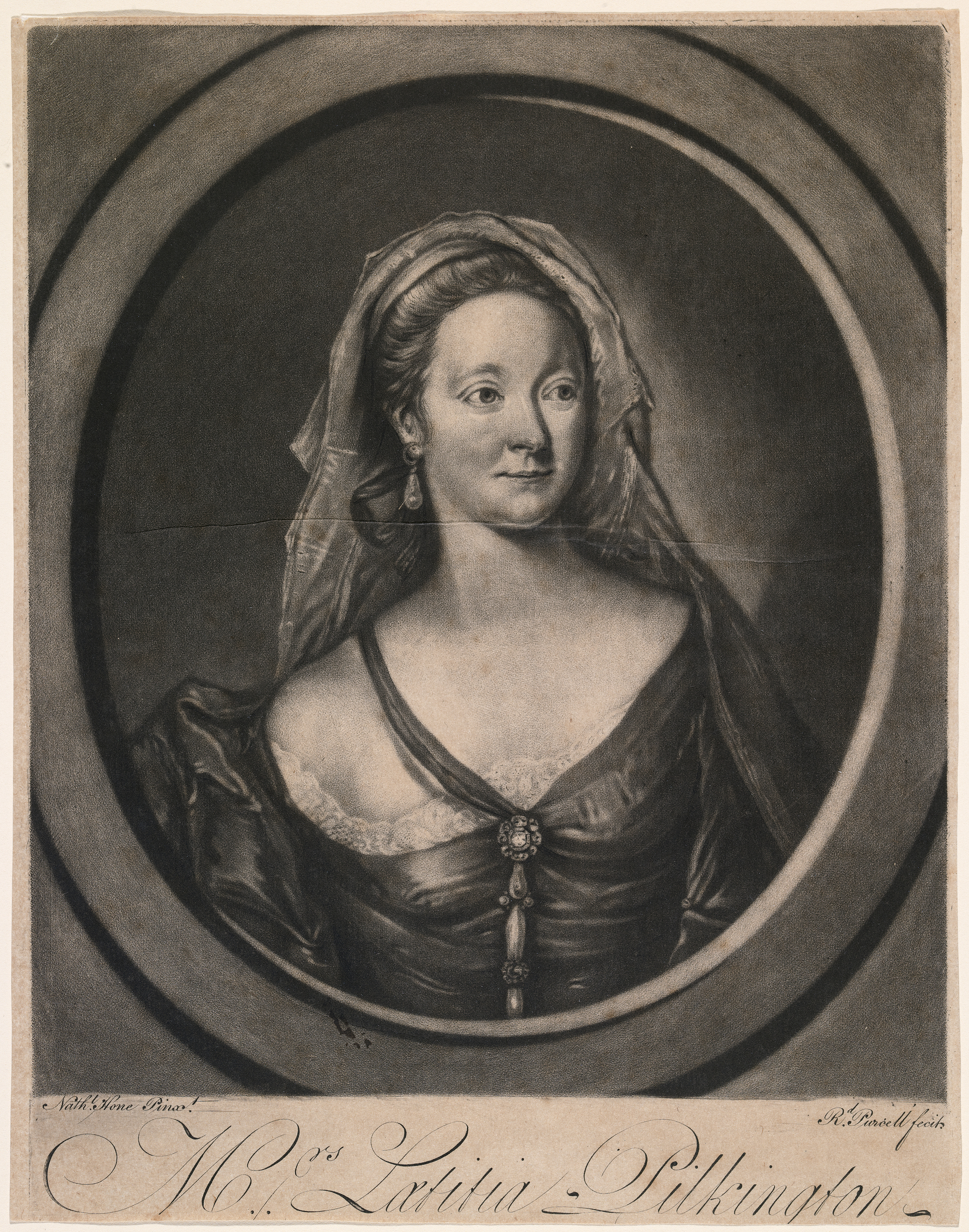
- Born: c. 1709
- Died: 29 July 1750
- Writing career
- Genre: poetry
- Notable work: Memoirs

Laetitia Pilkington (born Laetitia van Lewen; c. 1709 – 29 July 1750) was an Anglo-Irish poet. She is known for her Memoirs which document much of what is known about Jonathan Swift.

== Life ==
=== Early years ===
Laetitia was born of two distinguished families: Her father was a physician, obstetrician, and eventually the president of the College of Physicians for Ireland, while her mother was the niece of Sir John Meade. She was born either in Cork, where her parents lived at their marriage, or Dublin, where they moved by 1711.

=== Marriage ===
In her teenage years she married Matthew Pilkington in 1725, a priest in the Church of Ireland, who brought to the marriage all of his worldly possessions, a harpsichord, a cat, and an owl. The couple were introduced to Jonathan Swift at St. Patrick's Cathedral, Dublin, in 1725. Swift assisted the Pilkingtons, and helped Matthew attain a position as chaplain to the Lord Mayor of London for 1732–1733.

The assignment to London was a turning point for the couple. When Laetitia visited in 1733, she found her husband had become involved in numerous political schemes, neglected his clerical duties, and enjoyed the pleasures of the West End. Matthew attempted to lure Laetitia into adultery by introducing her to James Worsdale, a painter. Matthew organised a weekend visit to Windsor for his wife and Worsdale. Laetitia spent the carriage ride there fighting off Worsdale's advances and returning to London the following day.

In 1734, Laetitia returned to Dublin with her husband, who was arrested for corruption. In another attempt to rid himself of her, Matthew encouraged the young poet William Hammond to make advances on her.

=== Divorce ===
By 1737 Laetitia tired of her husband's behaviour, and considered herself to have been released from her marriage vows. She started an affair with Robert Adair (who would later be surgeon general of England). Eventually Matthew caught her and Adair in her bedroom in the presence of twelve witnesses. He immediately banished her from the house and prevented her from seeing her children or taking any money or possessions. Their divorce was granted by a Dublin court in February 1738, and cost Laetitia money, her friendship with Swift who damned her "as the most profligate whore in either kingdom", and Adair.

She began to write and sell her productions. She sold Worsdale poetry that he claimed for himself. In 1737, she wrote a feminist prologue for Worsdale's A Cure for a Scold as well as a performed but unpublished opera farce called No Death but Marriage.

=== Move to London ===
To escape her suitors and infamy, she returned to London in 1739. During the journey she had been propositioned first by a wealthy man who wanted her to be his mistress and later by a Welsh clergyman. She took up residence under the name of "Mrs. Meade".

In London, Colley Cibber became her acquaintance and advised her on how to make money from the press, as he had previously done with his Apology for the Life of Colley Cibber, Comedian. She took up lodgings opposite White's, an exclusive club in St James and engaged in witty combat with members that stood outside. These exchanges led to her working as the in-house wit and writer for club members. She also sold verses to Cibber's friends to pass off as their own. In 1739 Dodsley published her long poem The Statues: or, The Trial of Constancy. A Tale for the Ladies, which was about male sexual inconstancy. She lived commission to commission and was arrested in 1742 for a two pound debt. She was imprisoned for three months in the Marshalsea gaol. Her financial crisis worsened as she attempted to pay the costs of her imprisonment during which she struggled to pay for her food. She wrote to numerous requests for help with Cibber was able to arrange sixteen dukes to send her a guinea each. Further assistance came from Rev. Patrick Delany, an Irish acquaintance who sent her twelve guineas with instruction that she could collect it from his printer and novelist Samuel Richardson.

After being released from prison she approached Richardson at his home and was invited in for lunch and dinner. As well as passing on Delany's money Richardson also contributed two guineas of his own and encouraged her. Richardson later consulted with her on aspects of his novel Clarissa.

In 1743, she followed Cibber's advice and began seeking subscribers for her Memoirs. Her ex-husband Matthew ensured that the Memoirs would not be published in London.

=== Return to Dublin ===
Laetitia, with Richardson's financial assistance, moved back to Dublin in May 1747. With the manuscript of her memoirs barely begun, little money, and in poor health, she caught the attention of Robert King (who soon became Lord Kingsborough) by sending a general-purpose eulogy praising him to his town house. Pleased with what she had written he soon began financially supporting both her and her son John. John bragged about the relationship and a rumor reached King that the Pilkingtons had spoken disrespectfully of him. King arrived at Laetitia's residence and demanded his letters back. As the letters had value, she and John copied them before returning the originals.

The first two volumes of the Memoirs appeared in 1748, and a third volume was unfinished at her death, although her son, John Carteret Pilkington, had it published in 1754. One influence on the Memoirs is contemporary poet Alexander Pope; critic Annie Persons has displayed how Pilkington's Memoirs seek to "reconfigure literary hierarchies" by putting herself within Pope's literary history.

Laetitia died on 29 July 1750, most likely of a bleeding ulcer, and was buried in Dublin.

Some years after her death her son John published Sir Robert King's letters in an appendix to his autobiography, The Real Story of John Carteret Pilkington.
