= Matthew Pilkington =

Irish priest and historian

Reverend Matthew Pilkington
- Born: 1701; Ballyboy, King's County, Ireland
- Died: 18 July 1774 (aged 72–73); Dublin, Ireland
- Education: Trinity College Dublin

Matthew Pilkington (1701–1774), Church of Ireland priest, writer, and art historian, was the author of a standard text on painters that became known as Pilkington's Dictionary. His first wife was the poet and memoirist Laetitia Pilkington and their second son was the singer and writer John Carteret Pilkington.

== Career ==
Born in 1701 in King's County, his parents were William Pilkington, originally a watchmaker who later kept a Dublin alehouse and died in 1748, and his wife Alice, who died in 1749. He entered Trinity College Dublin, where he was elected a Scholar in 1721 and graduated BA in 1722, and was ordained a deacon in the Church of Ireland in 1723. By 1725, when he qualified for an MA, he was a reader in St Andrew's Church, Dublin and was courting a parishioner, Laetitia van Lewen. The pair married on 31 May and both became friends of Jonathan Swift, the Dean of St. Patrick's Cathedral, Dublin, who encouraged their gifts for poetry and satire and introduced them to other Irish literary figures such as Mary Barber, Constantia Grierson and Patrick Delany.

Through Swift's influence, Matthew obtained the post of chaplain to the Lord Mayor of London in 1732 and, leaving Laetitia in Dublin, mixed with leading figures on the English theatrical and literary scene, including Alexander Pope. However, he also antagonised influential people and was imprisoned in 1734. Going quietly back to Dublin after his release, he had lost the support of most Irish literary figures, including Swift, and instead associated with such characters as the rascally painter James Worsdale and Edward Walpole, the prime minister's dissolute son. There followed a very public rupture with Laetitia, ending in an ecclesiastical divorce in 1738 that left him as the supposed innocent party with custody of their children.

Though living in Dublin, he then obtained church posts in villages outside and devoted himself to art history. In this endeavour he enjoyed the continued support of Charles Cobbe, Archbishop of Dublin from 1743 to 1765, and then of his son Thomas Cobbe, acting as their secretary and using his knowledge of paintings to help build their collection at Newbridge House. Despite a modest income, he also acquired some significant works for himself. In 1770 he saw published the major work for which he is remembered: The Gentleman's and Connoisseur's Dictionary of Painters. He died in Dublin on 18 July 1774, his second wife living on until 1785.

== Family ==
His first wife Laetitia van Lewen, born about 1709 in County Cork and like him diminutive, was the eldest child of a prominent Dublin obstetrician, Dr John van Lewen. Three of their children died in infancy and the later life of their daughter Betty is unclear. Of the two surviving sons, William the elder became a Church of Ireland clergyman holding rural livings, while Jack (John Carteret Pilkington) had a short but colourful career as singer, soldier, actor and writer in Ireland and in England.

After divorcing Laetitia in 1738, Matthew took Nancy Sandes as his mistress, marrying her on 27 August 1750 less than a month after Laetitia's death. Neither of the two children they had survived infancy. In his will of 14 February 1754, since destroyed, though he owned houses he had inherited from his parents and valuable artworks, he left his eldest son only five pounds while the estranged Jack and Betty were left one shilling each.

== Works ==
Some of Pilkington's published works were anonymous or pseudonymous, but his authorship is either obvious or generally recognised. It is however possible that other works under so far unattributed pseudonyms were by him as well. The book which made his name, however, was The Gentleman's and Connoisseur's Dictionary of Painters, which was regularly expanded, revised, and retitled through many editions, being renamed A Dictionary of Painters in the 1805 and 1810 versions of Henry Fuseli, and then A General Dictionary of Painters after 1824, commonly known as Pilkington's Dictionary. His works were not free of controversy, some of which he sought, and an example is his contribution to Rapin de Thoyras' Impartial History (1784) which has been described as, "an extreme falsification of his life".
