= The Coliseum at Rome by Moonlight =

Painting by Frederick Lee Bridell

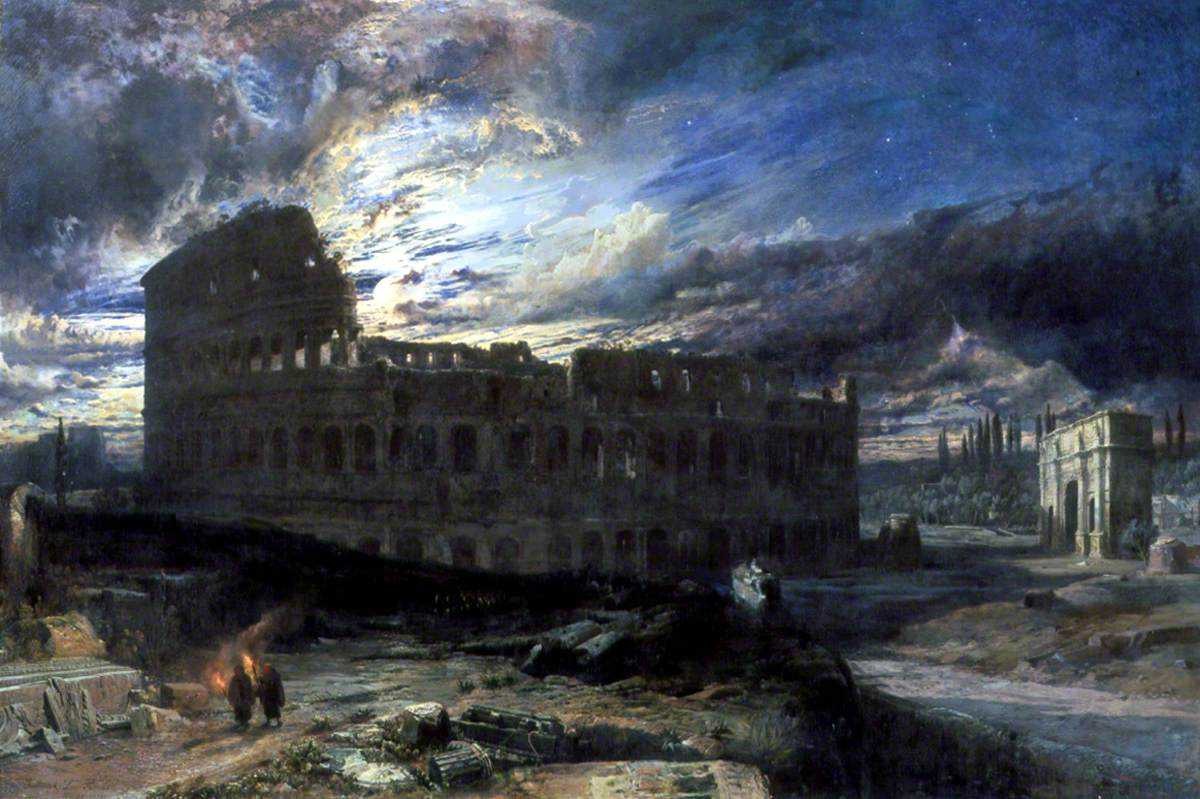
- Artist: Frederick Lee Bridell
- Year: 1859
- Type: Oil on canvas, landscape painting
- Dimensions: 155 cm × 230.5 cm (61 in × 90.7 in)
- Location: Southampton City Art Gallery, Southampton

The Coliseum at Rome by Moonlight is an 1859 oil painting by the British artist Frederick Lee Bridell. It features a nighttime cityscape of Rome with the Colosseum and Arch of Constantine shown by moonlight.

This approach to viewing Rome was strongly influenced by the Romantic movement and he used a passage in Lord Byron's poem Childe Harold's Pilgrimage as a guide. Bridell and his wife Eliza Bridell Fox had established themselves in the city where he has set up a studio with the backing of his patron James Joseph Wolfe. The painting was displayed at the Royal Academy Exhibition of 1860 in London where it was a popular success, being praised by the The Times. It was shown again at the 1862 International Exhibition at South Kensington. Bridell's rising career was cut short by his death from consumption at age 32 in 1863.

Today the picture forms part of the Southampton City Art Gallery collection, having been acquired in 1932.

== Bibliography ==
- Aitchison Hull, Catherine. Frederick Lee Bridell (1830-63). Matador, 2007
- Gray, Sara. The Dictionary of British Women Artists. Lutterworth Press, 2009.
