= Helen Allingham =

English illustrator and painter (1848–1926)

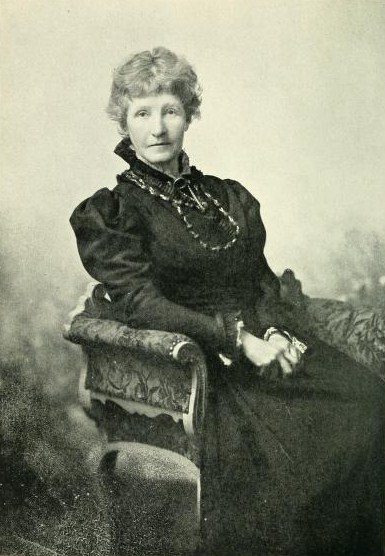
- Allingham in 1903
- Born: Helen Mary Elizabeth Paterson; 26 September 1848; Swadlincote, Derbyshire, England
- Died: 28 September 1926 (aged 78); Haslemere, Surrey, England
- Other names: H. Paterson
- Occupations: illustrator and watercolour artist
- Spouse: William Allingham (1874–1889)
- Website: Helen Allingham society

Helen Mary Elizabeth Allingham RWS (née Paterson; 26 September 1848 – 28 September 1926) was a British watercolourist and illustrator of the Victorian era.

== Biography ==
Helen Mary Elizabeth Paterson was born on 26 September 1848, at Swadlincote in Derbyshire, the daughter of Alexander Henry Paterson, a medical doctor, and Mary Herford Paterson. Helen was the eldest of seven children. The year after her birth the family moved to Altrincham in Cheshire. In 1862 her father and her three-year-old sister Isabel died of diphtheria during an epidemic. The remaining family then moved to Birmingham, where some of Alexander Paterson's family lived.

Paterson showed a talent for art from an early age, drawing some of her inspiration from her maternal grandmother Sarah Smith Herford and aunt Laura Herford, both accomplished artists of their day. Her younger sister Caroline Paterson also became a noted artist. She initially studied art for three years at the Birmingham School of Design. She spent a year at the Royal Female School of Art in London, before following her aunt Laura Herford to the National Art Training School. In 1867 she enrolled in the Royal Academy School, which would later become the Royal College of Art. There, Frederick Walker encouraged her work in watercolors.

== Career ==
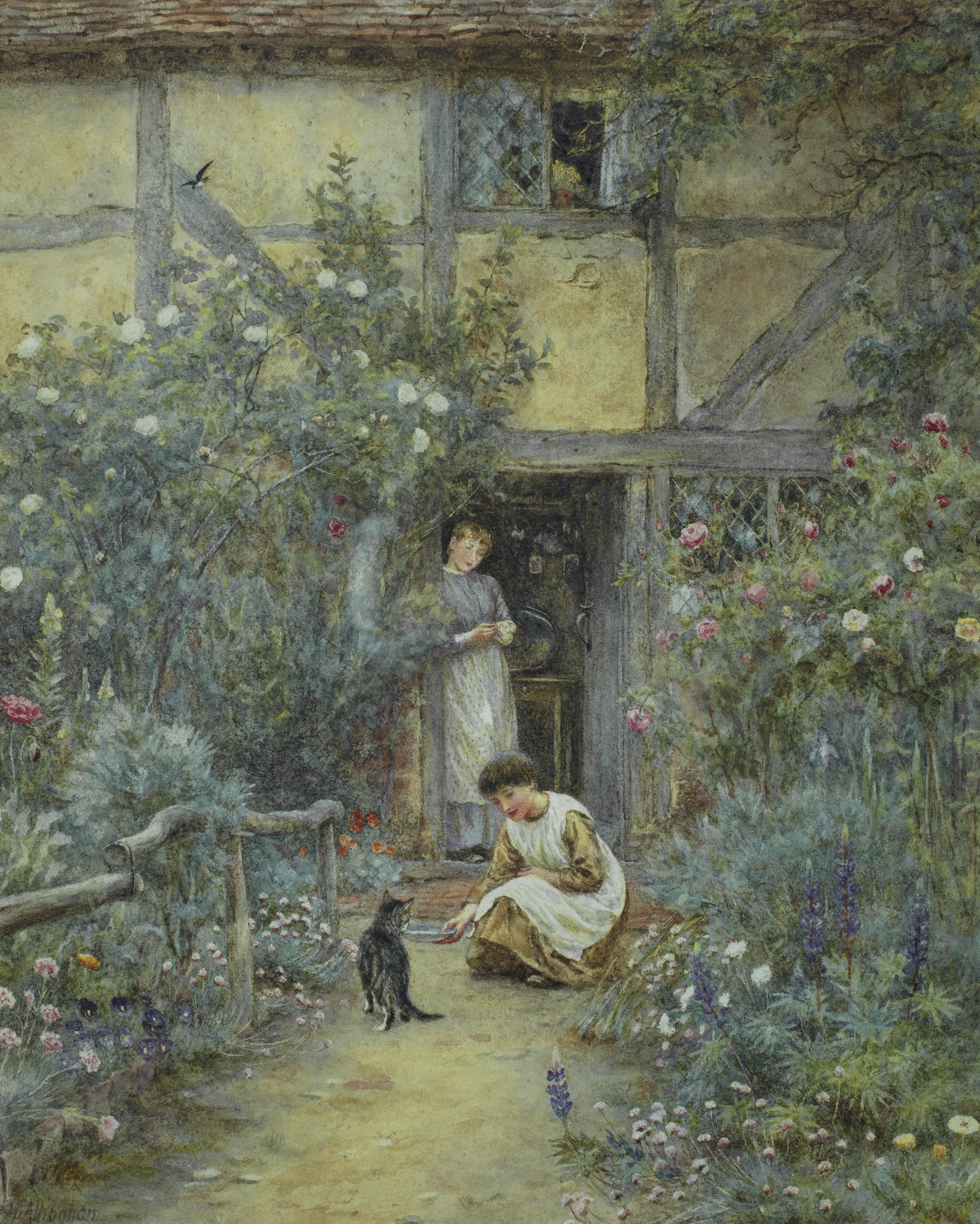
The saucer of milk

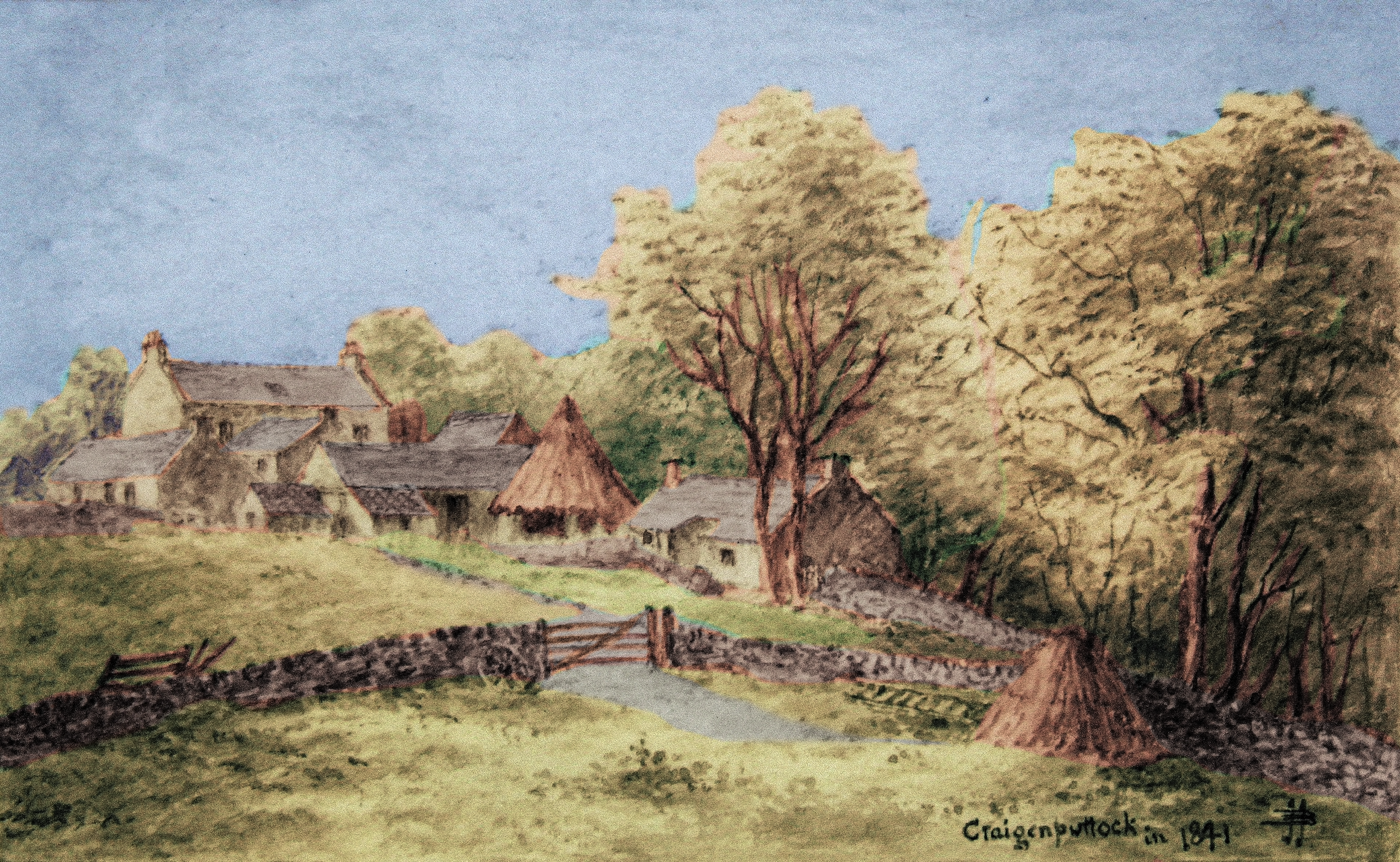
Allingham's watercolour painting of Craigenputtock, the home of Thomas Carlyle

While studying at the National Art Training School, Paterson worked as an illustrator, eventually deciding to give up her studies in favor of a full-time career in art. She painted for children's and adult books, as well as for periodicals, including The Graphic newspaper. One highlight was her commission to provide twelve illustrations for the 1874 serialisation of Thomas Hardy's novel Far from the Madding Crowd in Cornhill Magazine. Her illustrations from this era were signed either "H. Paterson" or "H. Allingham". She became a lifelong friend of Kate Greenaway whom she met at evening art classes at the Slade School of Fine Art.

While Vincent van Gogh was developing as an artist by studying English illustrated journals he was struck by Paterson's work in The Graphic. Although women could not gain the same recognition as men at the time, Helen Allingham was one of the women artists who made a considerable impact, as artists like Van Gogh were influenced by her.

On 22 August 1874 she married William Allingham, Irish poet and editor of Fraser's Magazine, who was almost twice her age. After her marriage, she gave up her career as an illustrator and turned to watercolour painting. In 1881 the family moved from Chelsea to Witley in Surrey. Her first son, Gerald Carlyle, was born in November 1875. Her daughter was born on 21 February 1877 and her last son on 11 May 1882. Helen started to paint the countryside around her and particularly the picturesque farmhouses, cottages and gardens of Surrey and Sussex, for which she became famous.

In 1889, her husband died. Aged 41, she felt the pressure to support her 3 young children (14, 12, and 7) and stepped up the production of watercolour. These were done with great attention to detail and avoiding any sense of squalor or hardship. They became wildly popular, possibly because of the nostalgic needs of ex pats who went to faraway colonies or of those living in industrialising cities. However, her works were also criticised as "overly sentimental, conservative vision of the area". She went on to paint rural scenes in other parts of the country – Middlesex, Kent, the Isle of Wight and the West Country – and abroad in Venice, Italy. As well as landscapes, she completed several portraits, including one of Thomas Carlyle

In 1890, Allingham became the first woman to be admitted as a full member of the Royal Watercolour Society. At the 1893 World's Columbian Exposition in Chicago, Illinois she exhibited her work at the Palace of Fine Arts.

== Legacy ==
The Helen Allingham Society was founded in 2000. Her time in Altrincham is commemorated by blue plaques at 16 Market Street, Altrincham and at Levenhurst, St. John's Road, Bowdon.

Burgh House, Hampstead, has the world's largest archive and collection of her work.

== Paintings ==
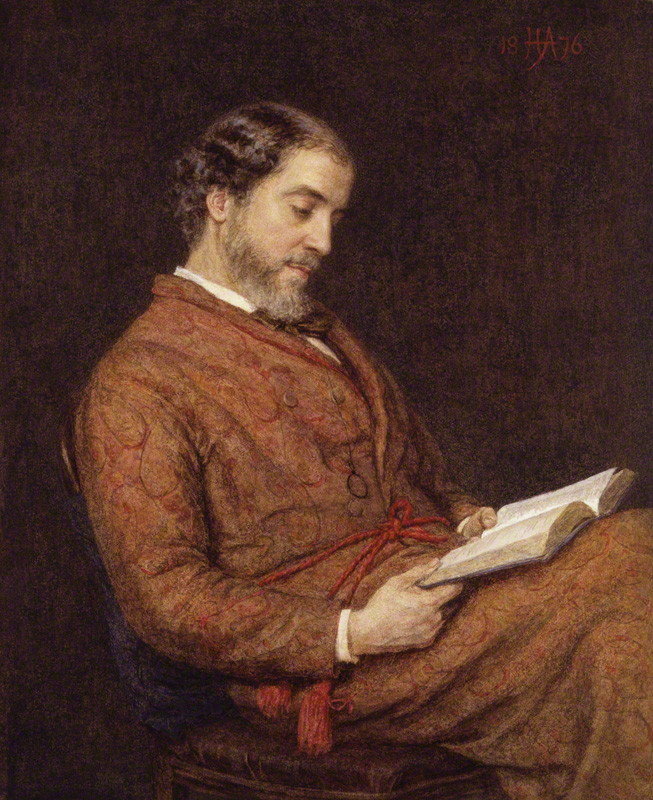
William Allingham 1876

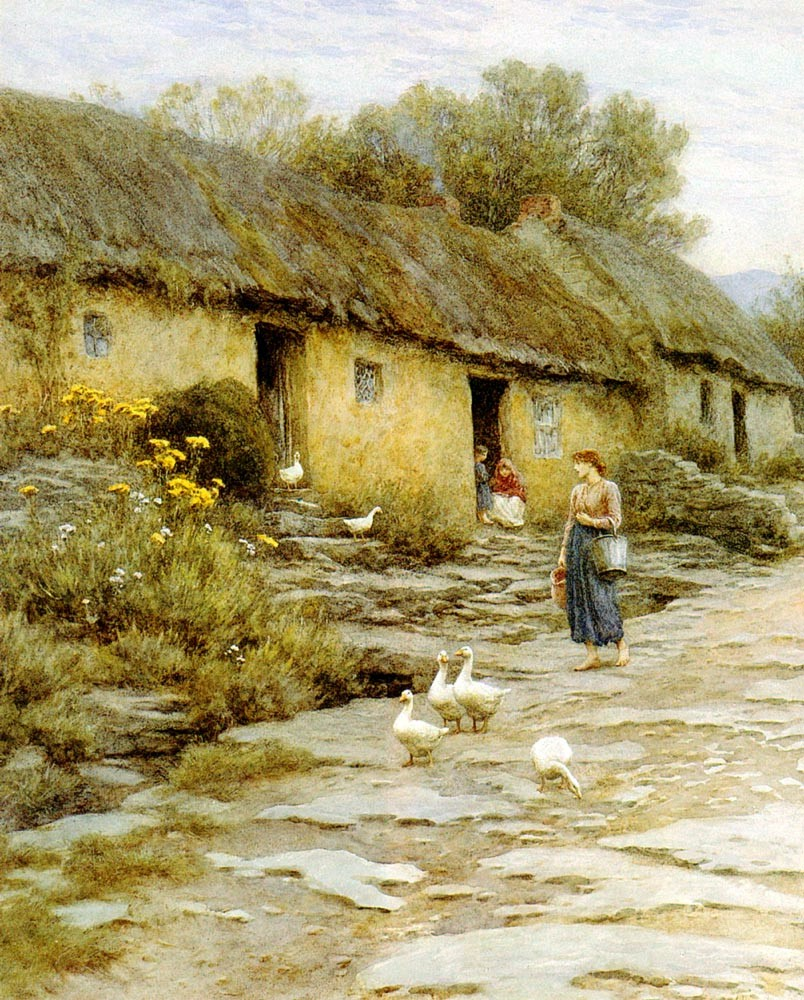
Irish Cottage

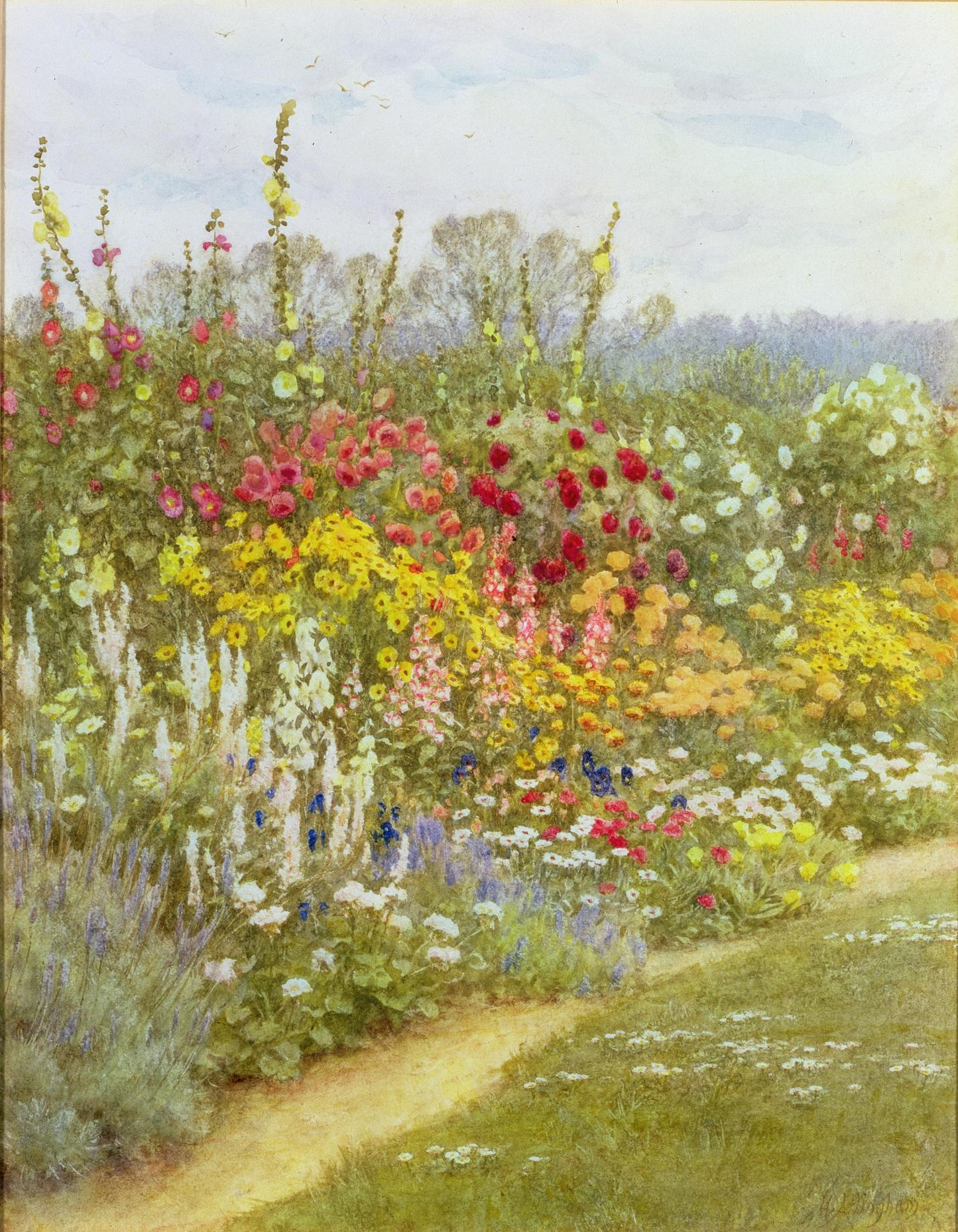
A Herbaceous Border

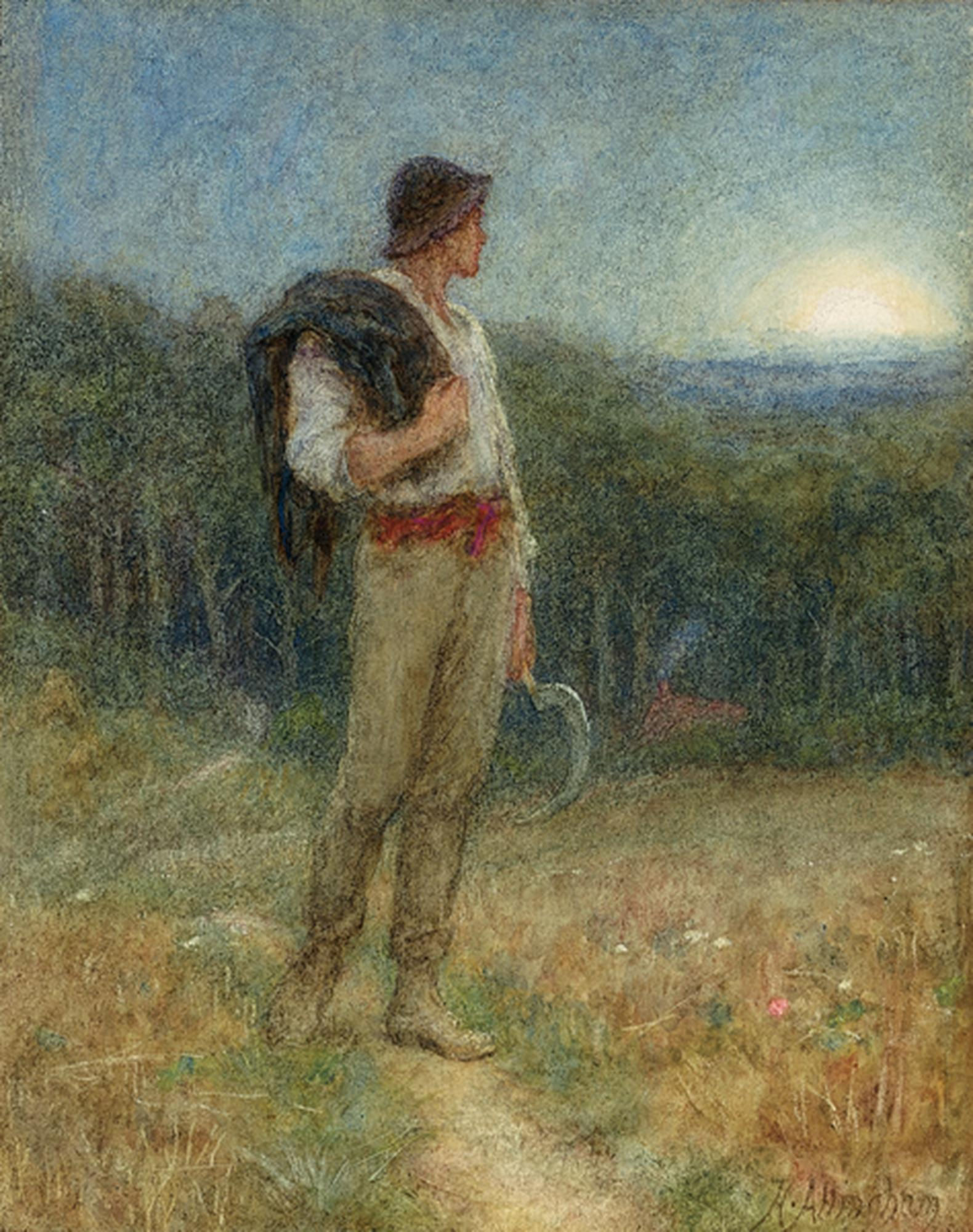
Harvest Moon

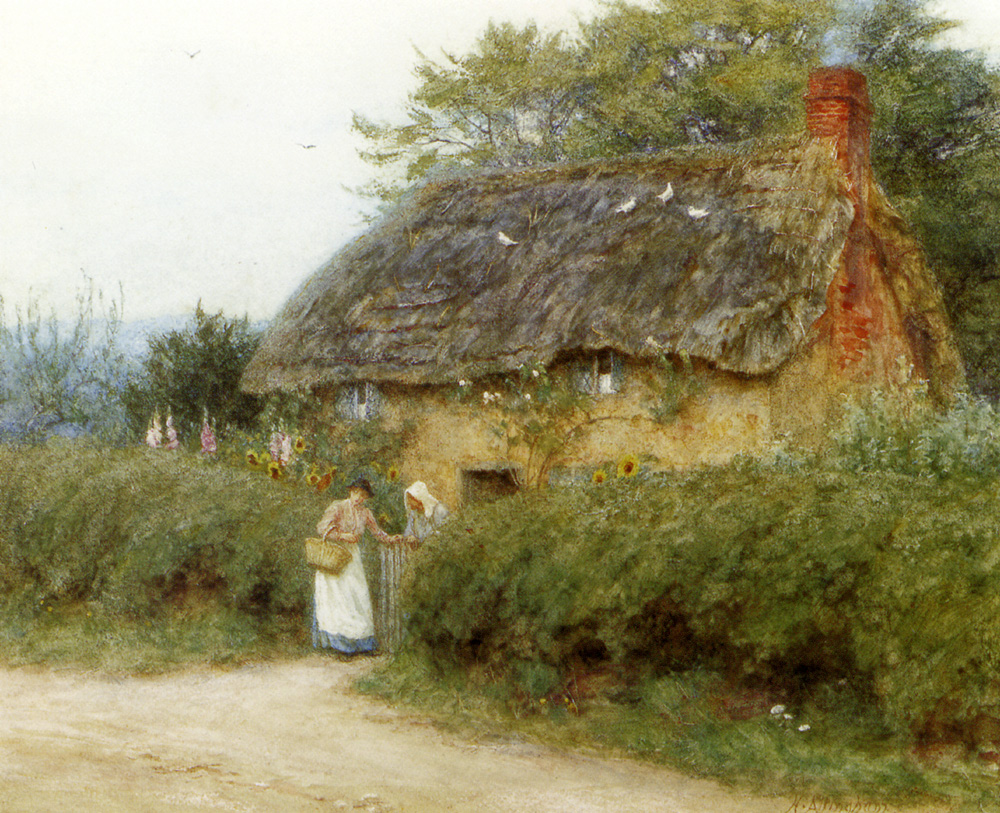
A Cottage With Sunflowers At Peaslake

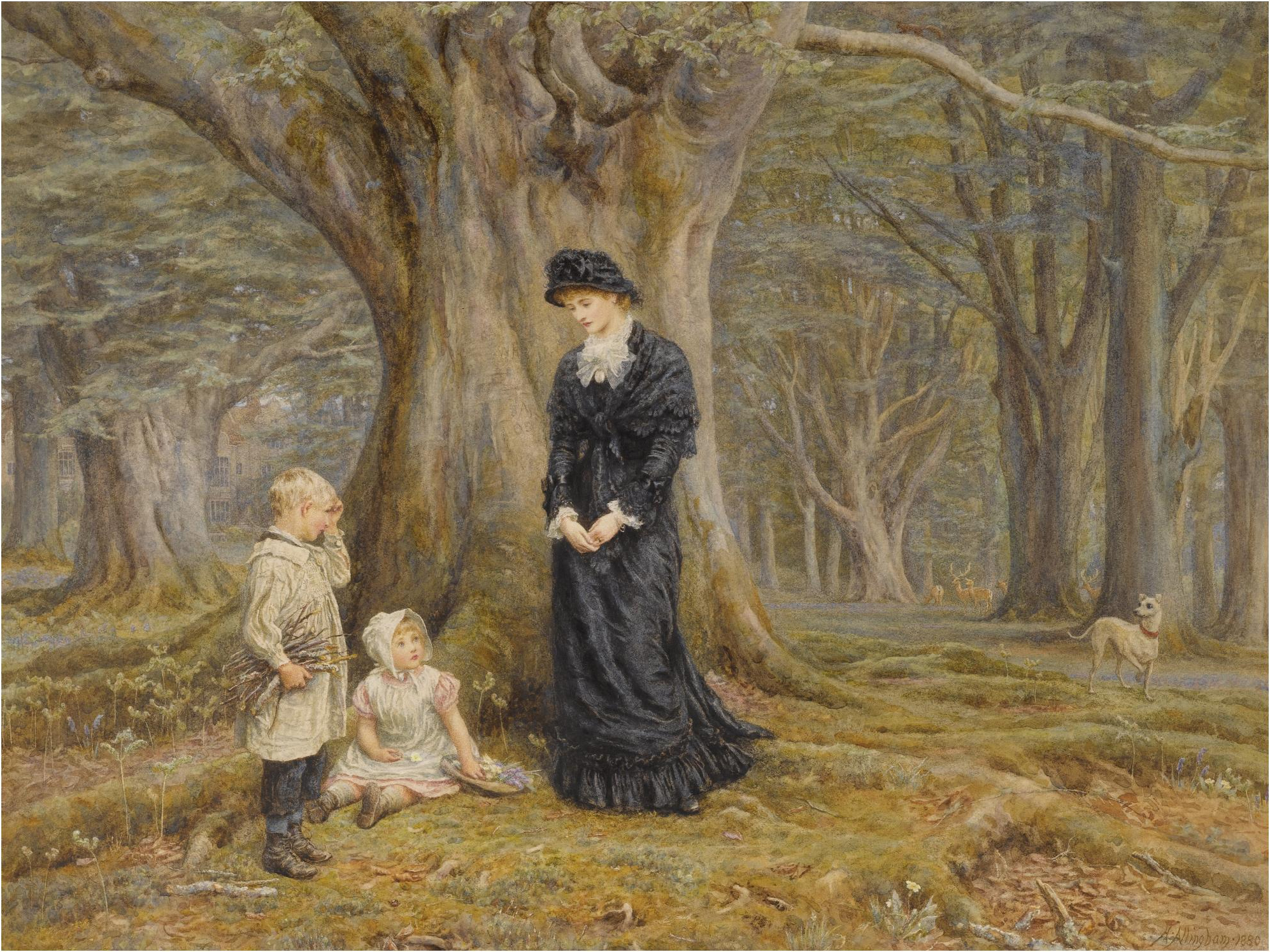
The Lady of the Manor

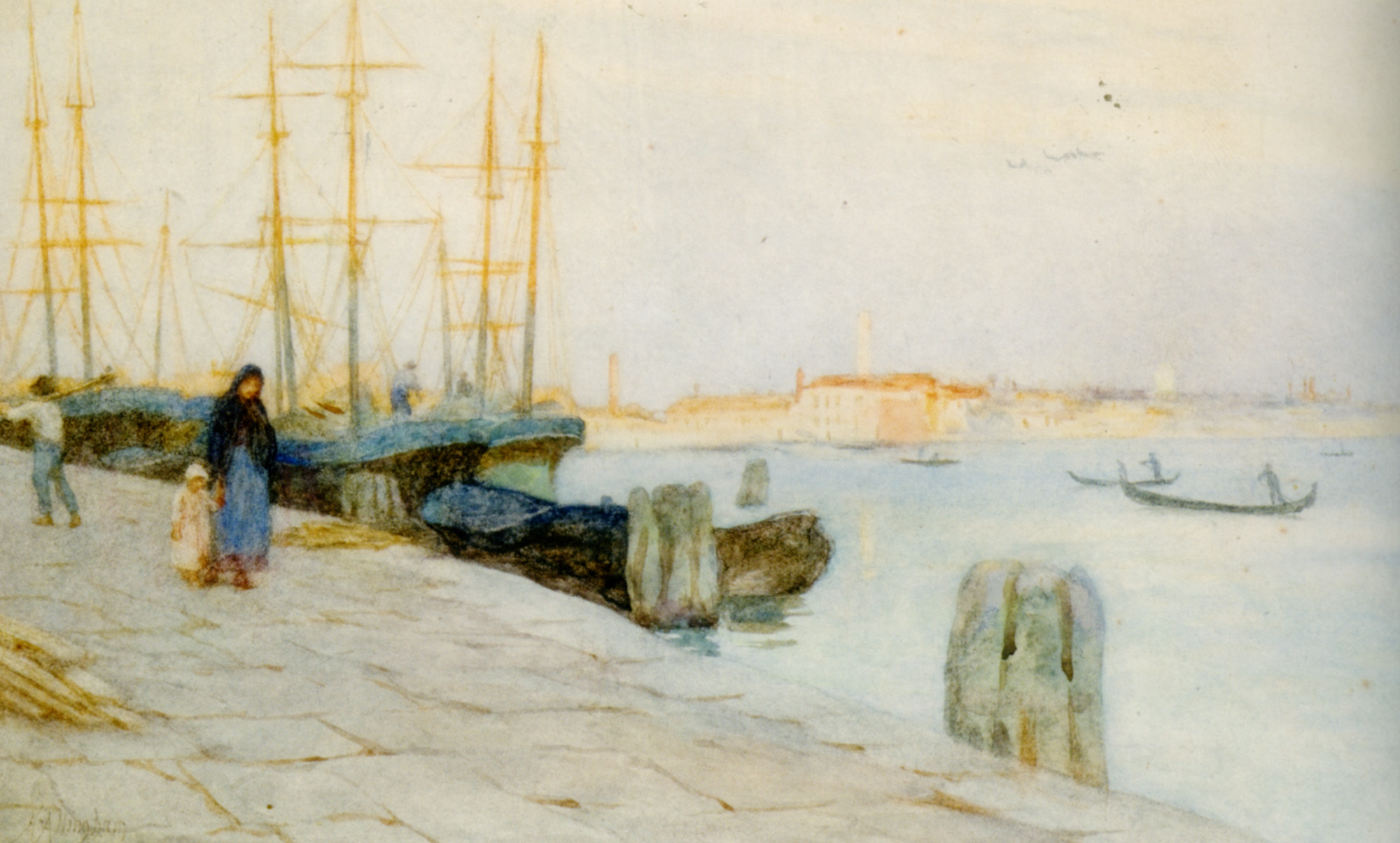
Morning at the Quay in Venice

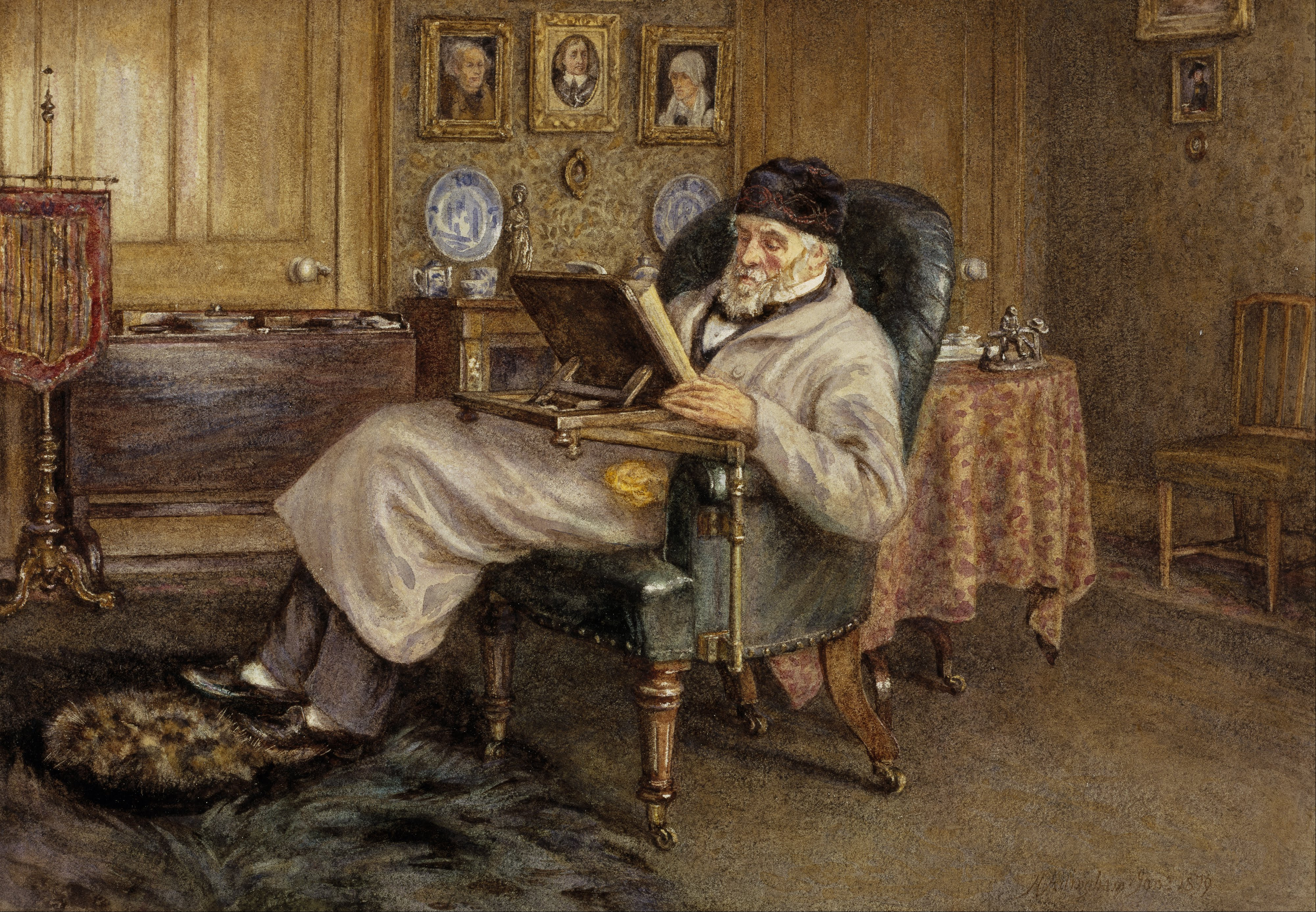
Thomas Carlyle, historian and essayist (1795–1881)

== Bibliography ==
=== Illustrated by Helen Allingham ===
- Huish, Marcus B. (1903). Happy England as Painted by Helen Allingham, R.W.S. Adam & Charles Black. OCLC 9062256.
- Paterson, Arthur Henry (1905). The homes of Tennyson (Adam & Charles Black). Paterson was Helen Allingham's brother.
- Dick, Stewart (1909). The Cottage Homes of England. Edward Arnold. OCLC 1058047344.

=== Written by Helen Allingham ===
- Seedtime and reaping (Samuel Tinsley, 1877).

== See also ==
- Walter Tyndale (1855–1943), influenced by Allingham and also lived in Surrey.
- Myles Birket Foster
