= Southampton City Art Gallery =

Art gallery in England

Coordinates: 50.9085°N 1.4065°W

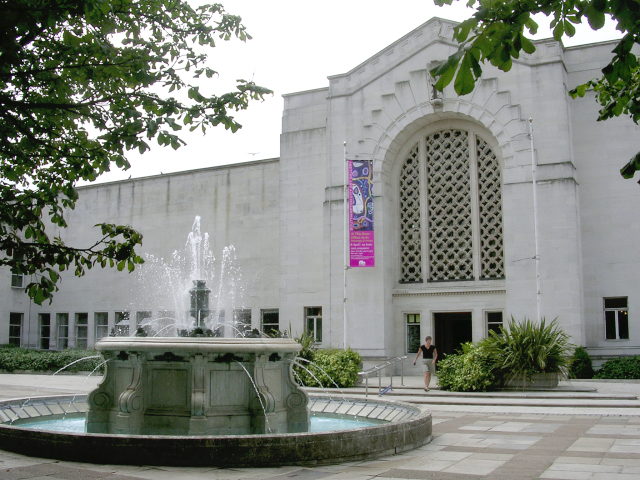
Southampton City Art Gallery

The Southampton City Art Gallery is an art gallery in Southampton, southern England. It is located in the Civic Centre on Commercial Road.

The gallery opened in 1939 with much of the initial funding from the gallery coming from two bequests, one from Robert Chipperfield (1817–1911) and another from Frederick William Smith. The gallery was damaged during World War II and repairing this damage delayed its reopening until 1946.

The gallery's art collection covers six centuries of European art history, with over 5,300 works in its fine art collection. It is housed in an example of 1930s municipal architecture. The gallery holds a Designated Collection, considered of national importance.

Highlights of the permanent collection include a 14th-century altarpiece by Allegretto Nuzi, of the Italian Giambattista Pittoni; the Perseus series by Burne-Jones; paintings by the Camden Town Group and The London Group; sculpture by Jacob Epstein, Auguste Rodin, Edgar Degas, Henri Gaudier Brzeska, Richard Deacon and Tony Cragg; and Richard Long photographs.

In October 2024 the gallery recvied a grant of £26,000 from Arts Council England to digitalise part of its collection.

It is planned for the gallery to close 22 February 2025 for about a year to allow for repairs to the roof and upgrades to the heating system.

In November 2012, it was announced that the gallery's opening times were likely to be significantly reduced, as part of Southampton City Council's drive to save £20 million. On 1 April 2013, the art gallery's opening times changed to the following times:

- Monday-Friday: 10am-3pm
- Saturday: 10am-5pm
- Sunday: Closed

== Gallery ==
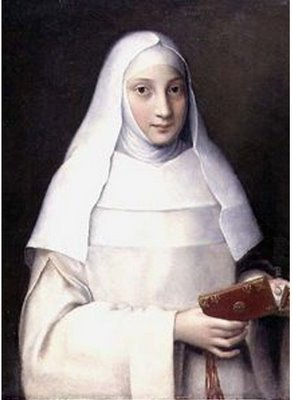
Portrait of Elena Anguissola by Sofonisba Anguissola, 1551

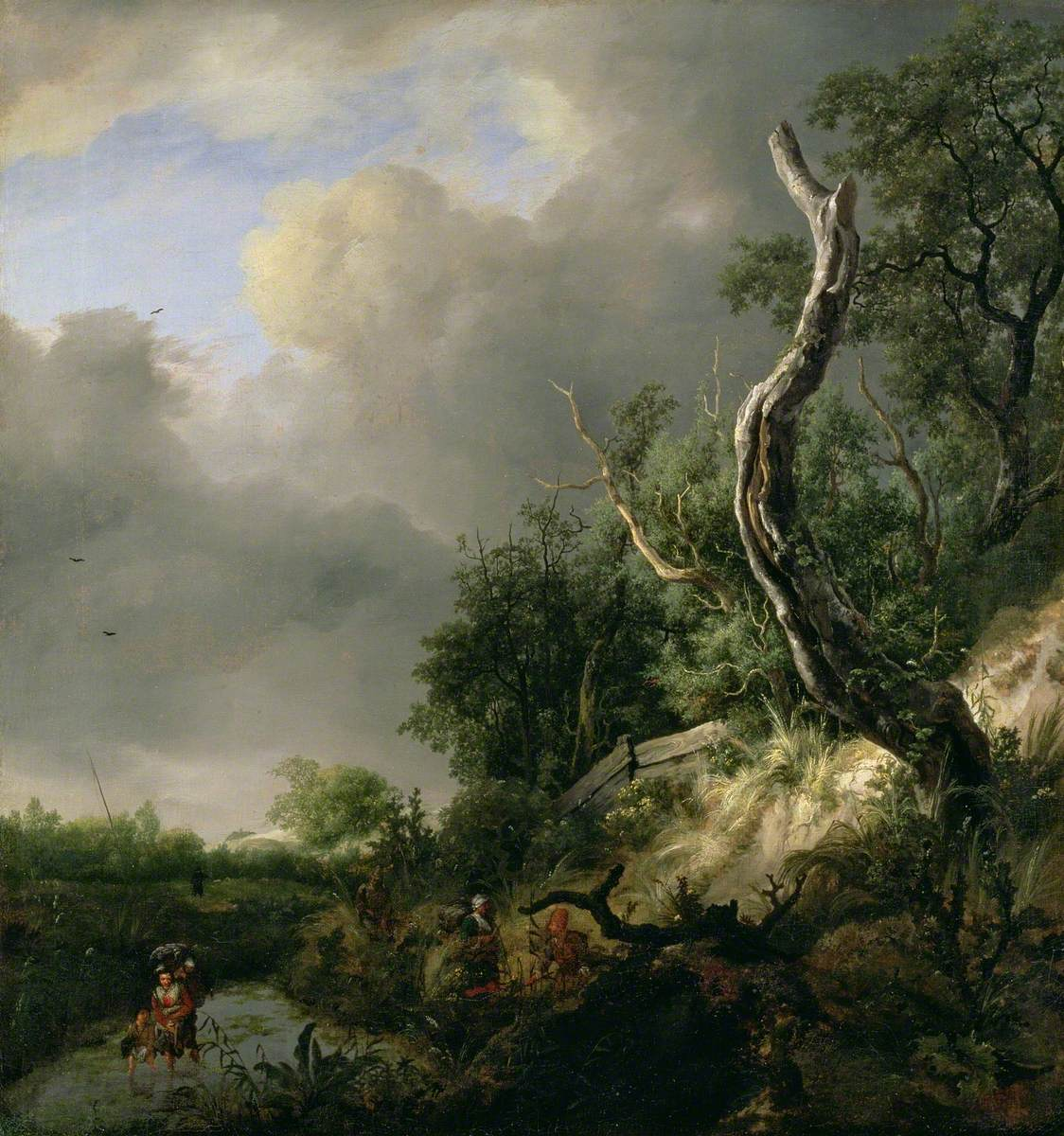
The Dunes near Haarlem by Jacob van Ruisdael, 1650

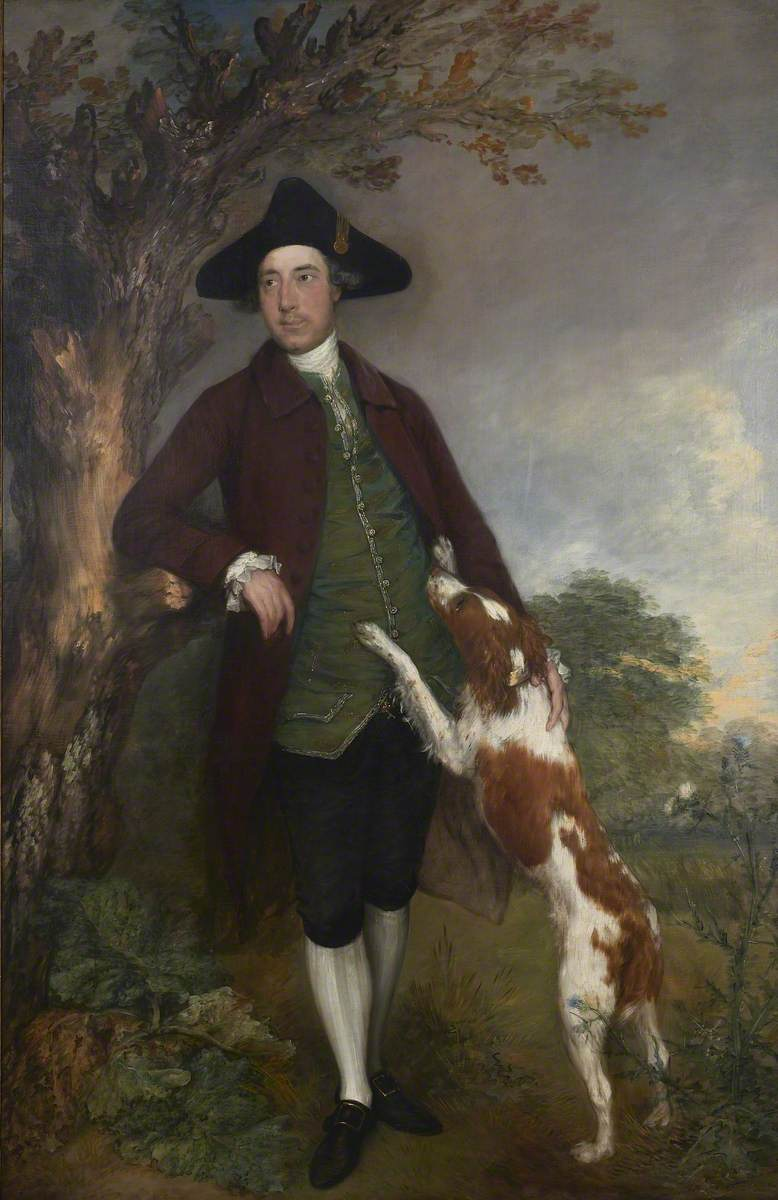
Portrait of Lord Vernon by Thomas Gainsborough, 1767

The Shipwreck by Philip James de Loutherbourg, 1793

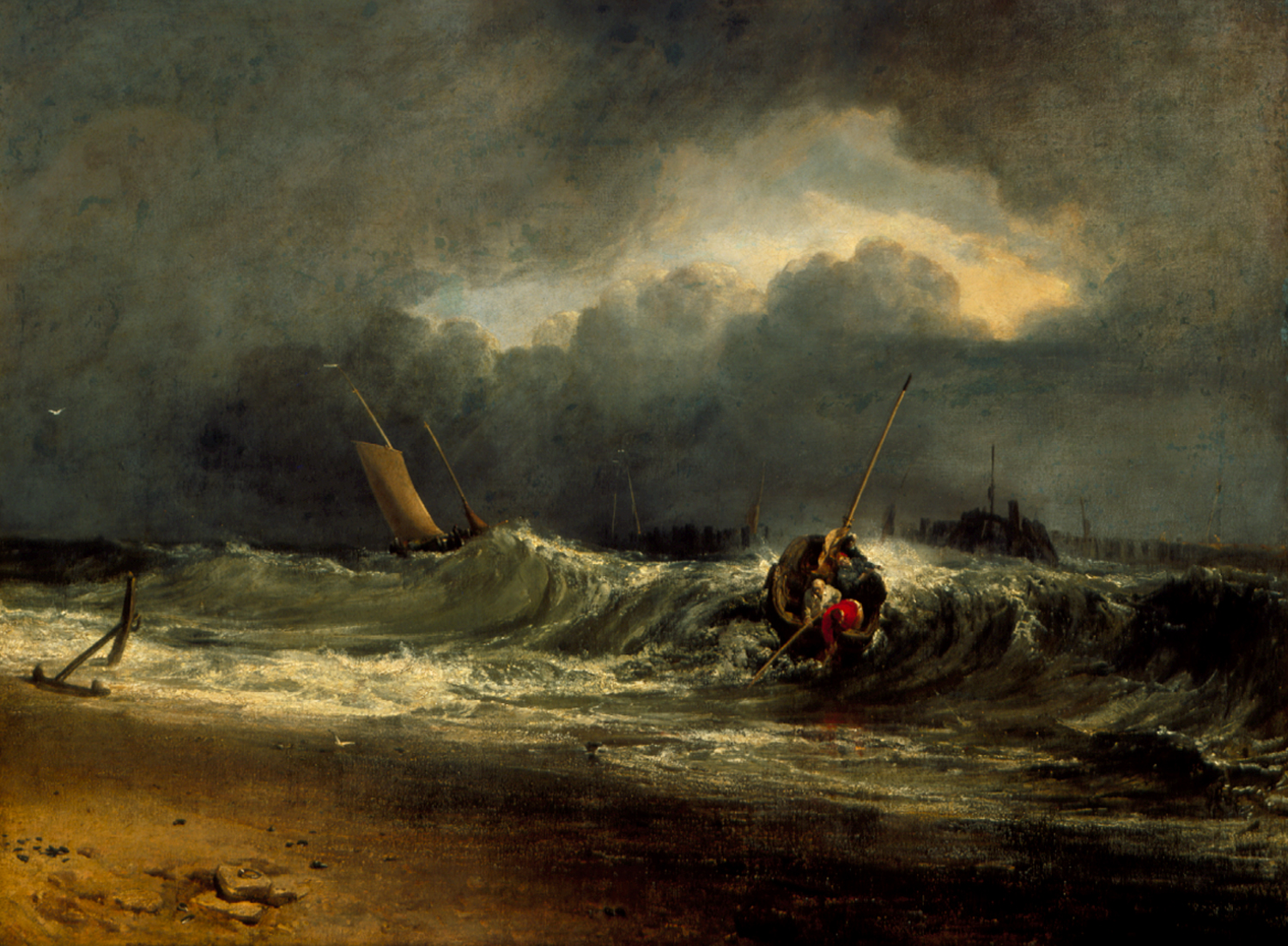
Fishermen Upon a Lee-Shore in Squally Weather by J.M.W. Turner, 1802

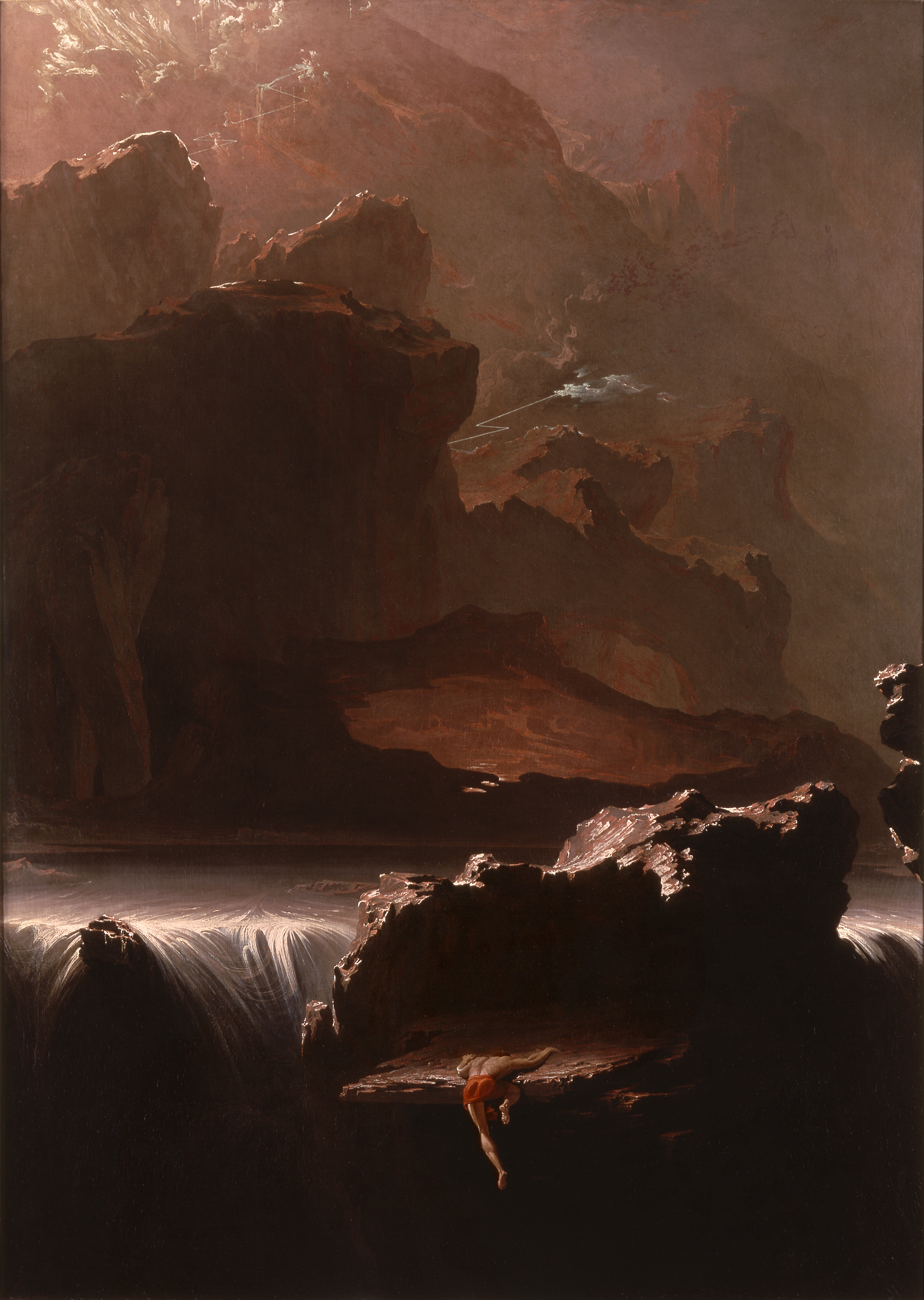
Sadak in Search of the Waters of Oblivion by John Martin, 1812

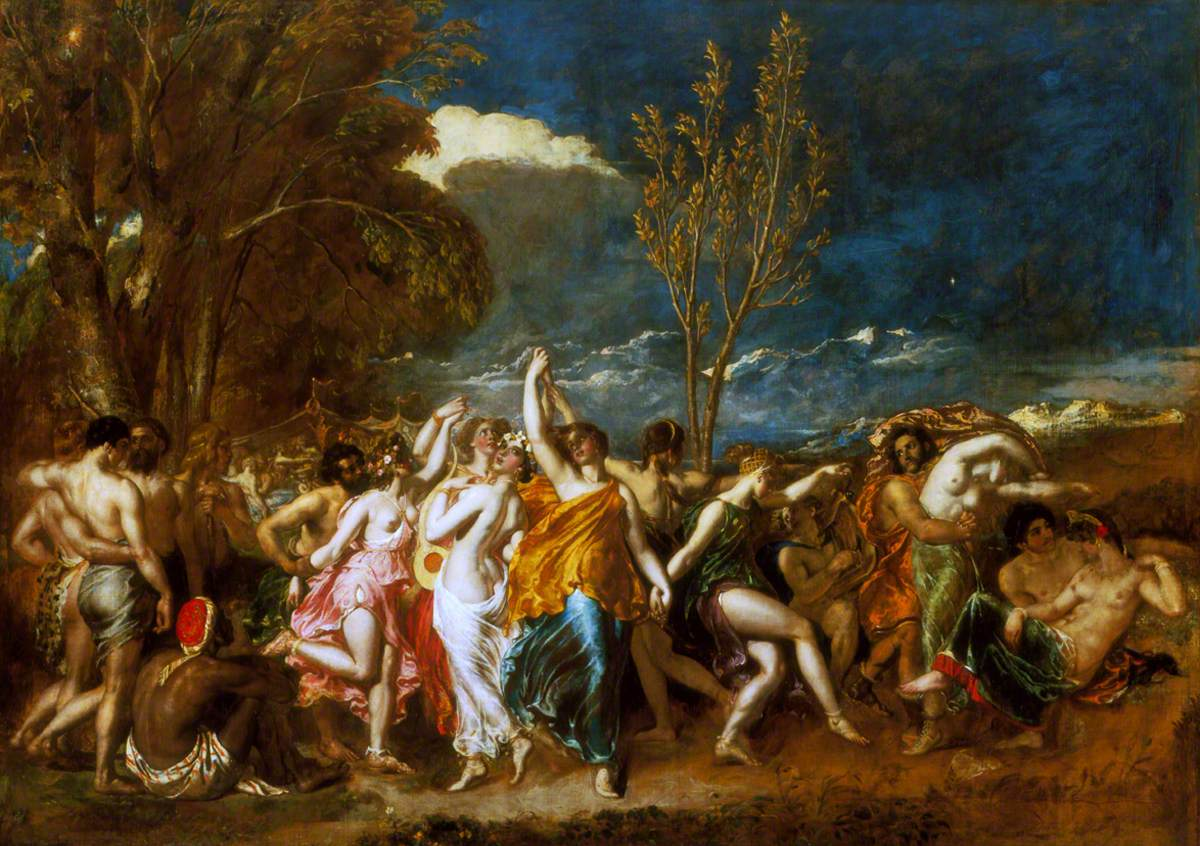
The World Before the Flood by William Etty, 1828

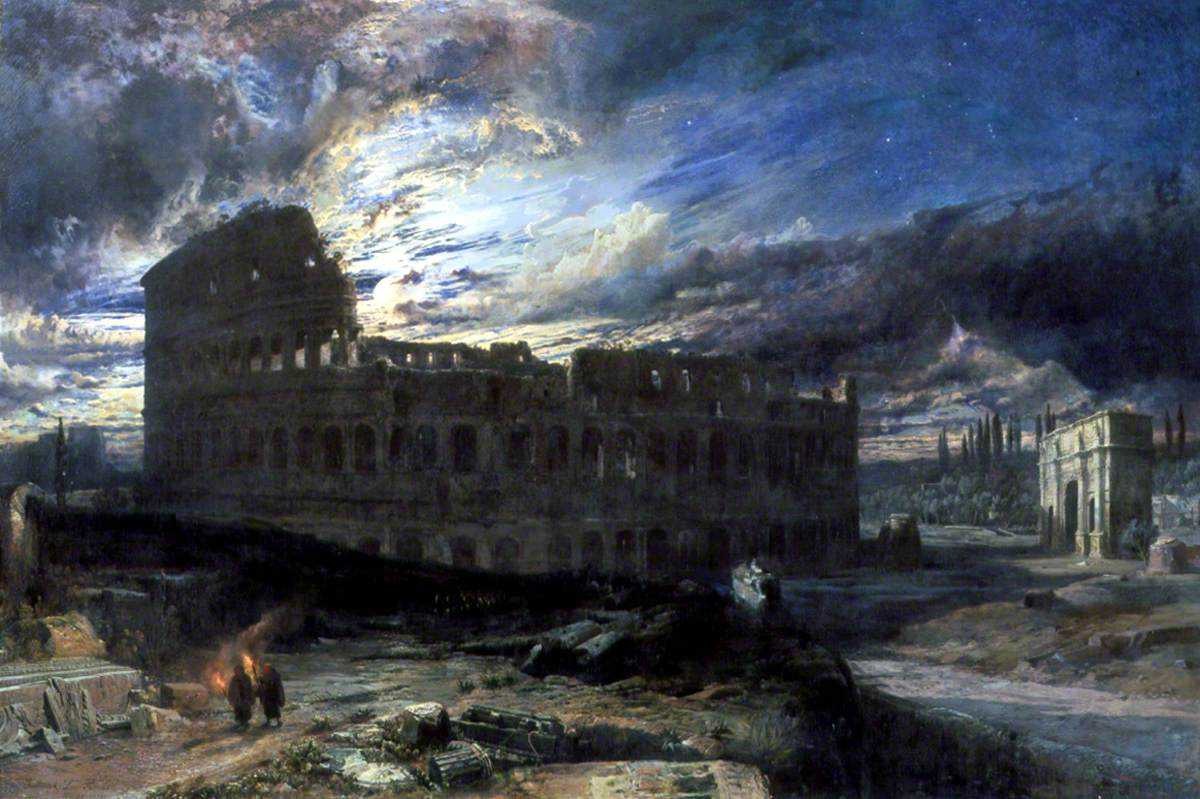
The Coliseum at Rome by Moonlight by Frederick Lee Bridell, 1859

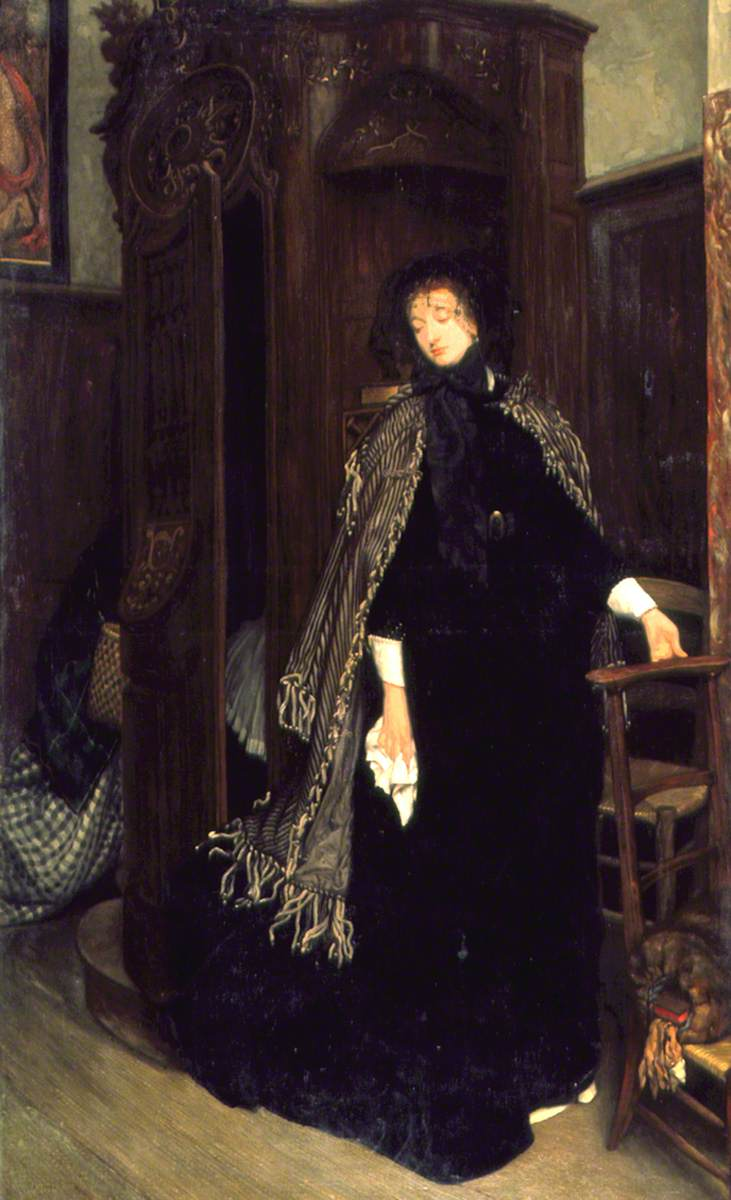
Leaving the Confessional by James Tissot, 1865

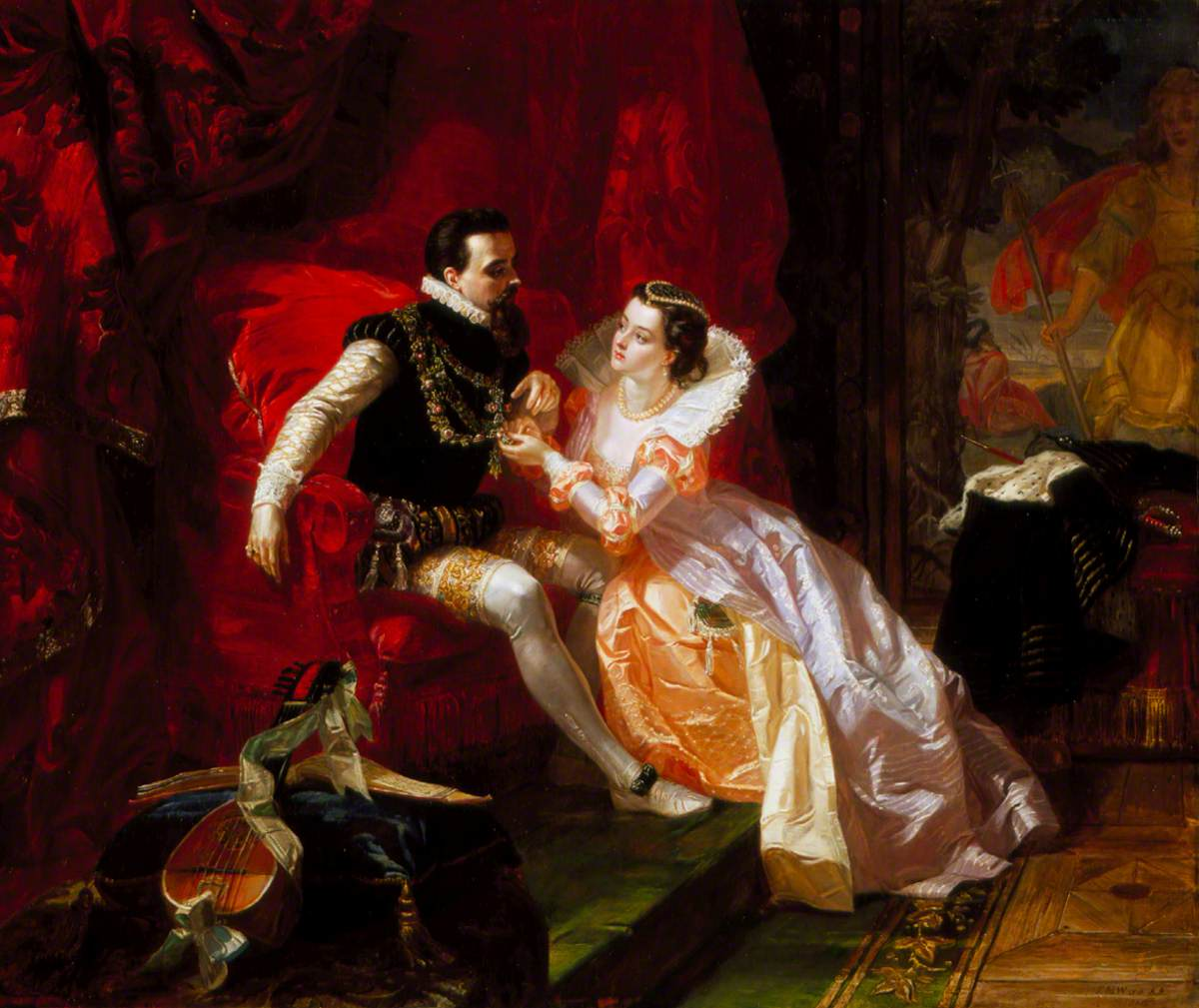
Leicester and Amy Robsart at Cumnor Hall by Edward Matthew Ward, 1866

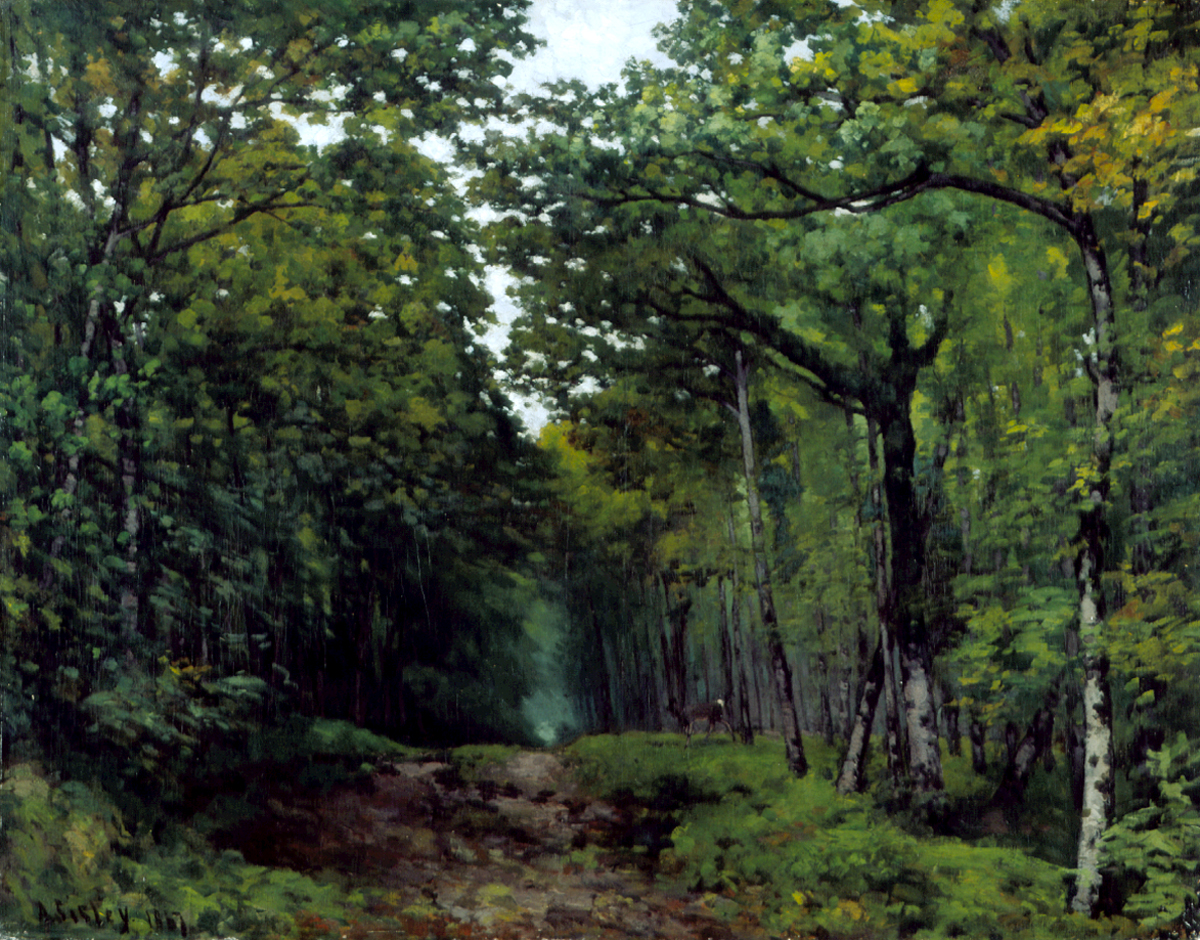
Avenue of Chestnut Trees near La Celle-Saint-Cloud by Alfred Sisley, 1867

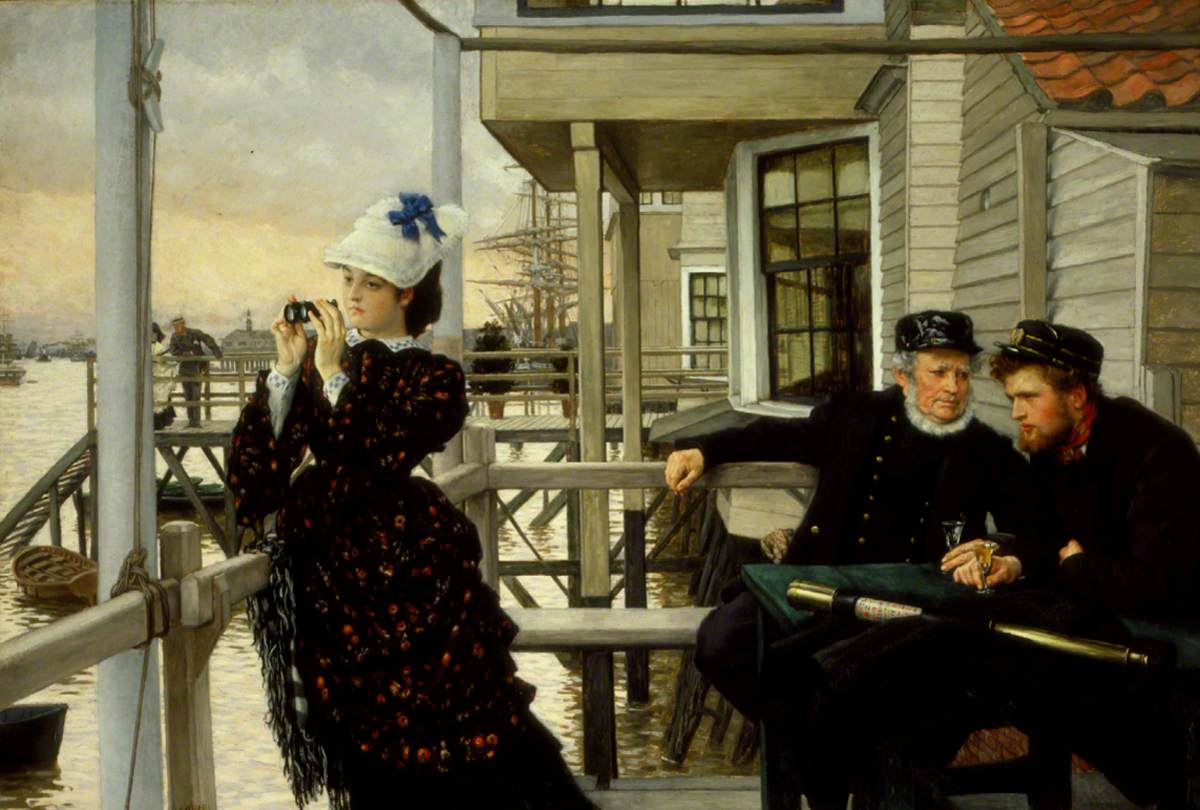
The Captain's Daughter by James Tissot, 1873

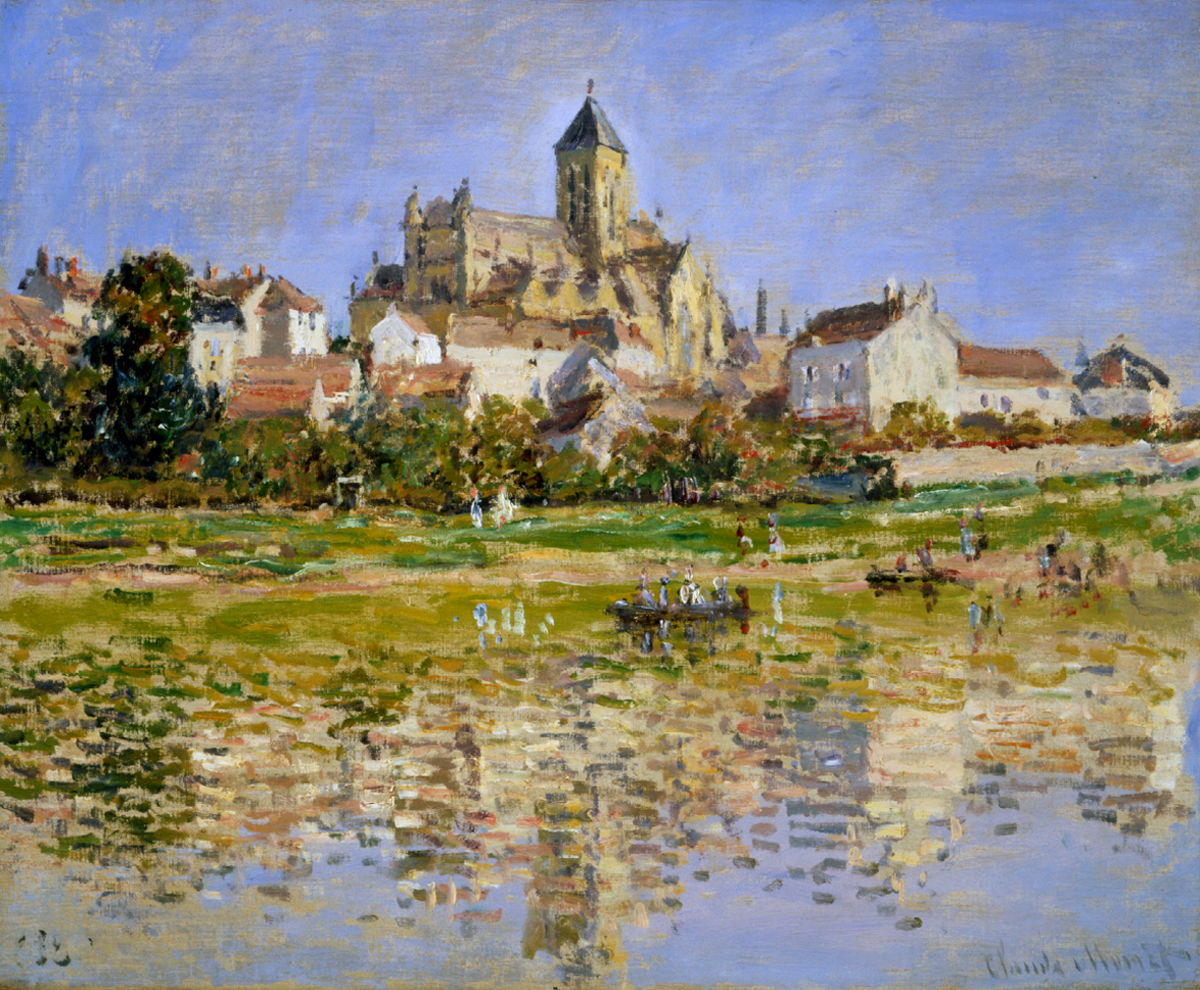
The Church at Vétheuil by Claude Monet, 1880

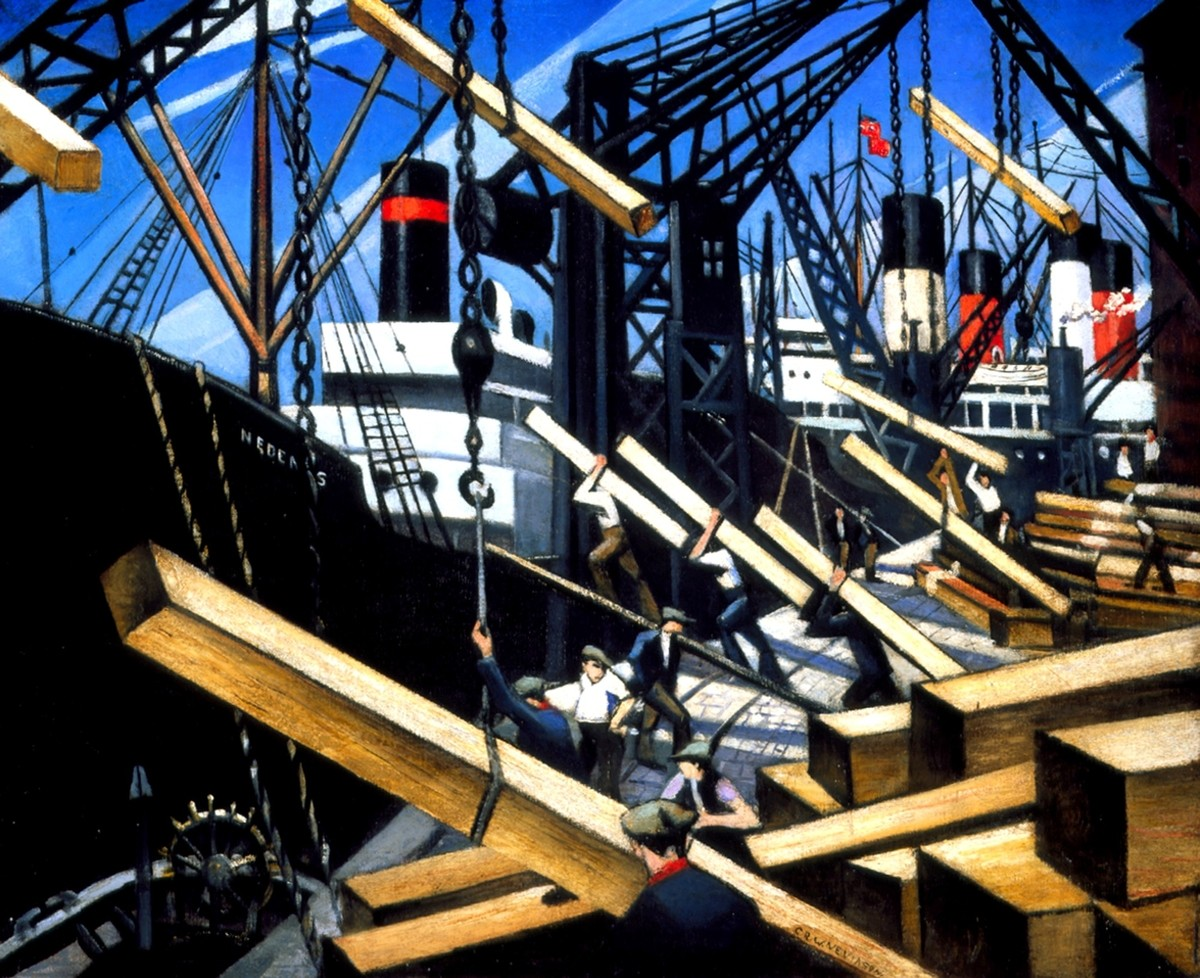
Loading Timber at Southampton Docks by C. R. W. Nevinson, 1917
