= The Shipwreck (Loutherbourg) =

Painting by Philip James de Loutherbourg

- Artist: Philip James de Loutherbourg
- Year: 1793
- Type: Oil on canvas, landscape painting
- Dimensions: 109.8 cm × 160.5 cm (43.2 in × 63.2 in)
- Location: Southampton City Art Gallery; Southampton

The Shipwreck is a 1793 landscape painting by the French artist Philip James de Loutherbourg. It depicts a shipwreck on a rocky coastline during a violent storm, where the survivors are attempting to get ashore only for their lifeboat to be attacked by bandits. The theme was one that interested Loutherbourg and he painted several variations of it including The Wreckers. It reflects the developing romantic movement of which Loutherbourg was a pioneer. Today the painting is in the collection of the Southampton City Art Gallery in Hampshire, having been acquired in 1949.

== Bibliography ==
- Herrmann, Luke. British Landscape Painting of the Eighteenth Century. Oxford University Press, 1974.
- Isham, Howard F. Image of the Sea: Oceanic Consciousness in the Romantic Century. Peter Lang, 2004.
- Preston, Lillian Elvira. Philippe Jacques de Loutherbourg: Eighteenth Century Romantic Artist and Scene Designer. University of Florida, 1977.
- Spencer-Longhurst, Paul. The Sun Rising Through Vapour: Turner's Early Seascapes. Third Millennium Information, 2003.
