= William Allingham =

19th-century Irish poet and scholar

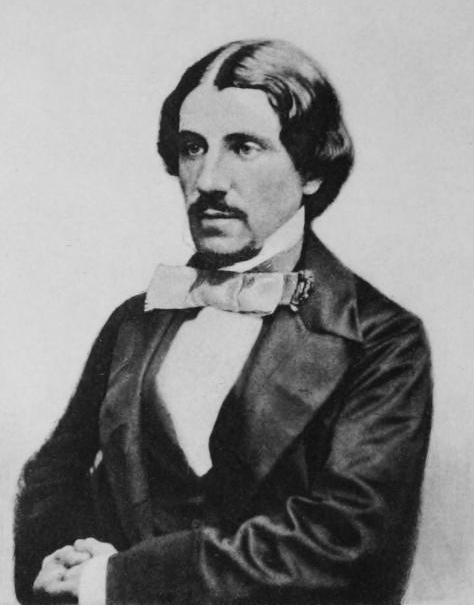
- Born: 19 March 1824; Ballyshannon, County Donegal, Ireland
- Died: 18 November 1889 (aged 65); Hampstead, London
- Occupations: poet, scholar
- Spouse: Helen Paterson Allingham (m. 1874–1889)

William Allingham (19 March 1824 – 18 November 1889) was an Irish poet, diarist and editor. He wrote several volumes of lyric verse, and his poem "The Faeries" was much anthologised. But he is better known for his posthumously published Diary, in which he records his lively encounters with Tennyson, Carlyle and other writers and artists. His wife, Helen Allingham, was a well-known artist, watercolourist and illustrator.

== Biography ==
William Allingham was born on 19 March 1824 in Ballyshannon, a small town in the south of County Donegal in Ulster in the north of Ireland, which is now in the Republic of Ireland. He was the son of William Allingham, the manager of a local bank who was of English descent. His younger brothers and sisters were Catherine (born 1826), John (born 1827), Jane (born 1829), Edward (born 1831, and lived only a few months) and a still-born brother (born 1833). During his childhood, his parents moved twice within the town, where the boy enjoyed the country sights and gardens, learned to paint and listened to his mother's piano-playing. When he was nine, his mother died.

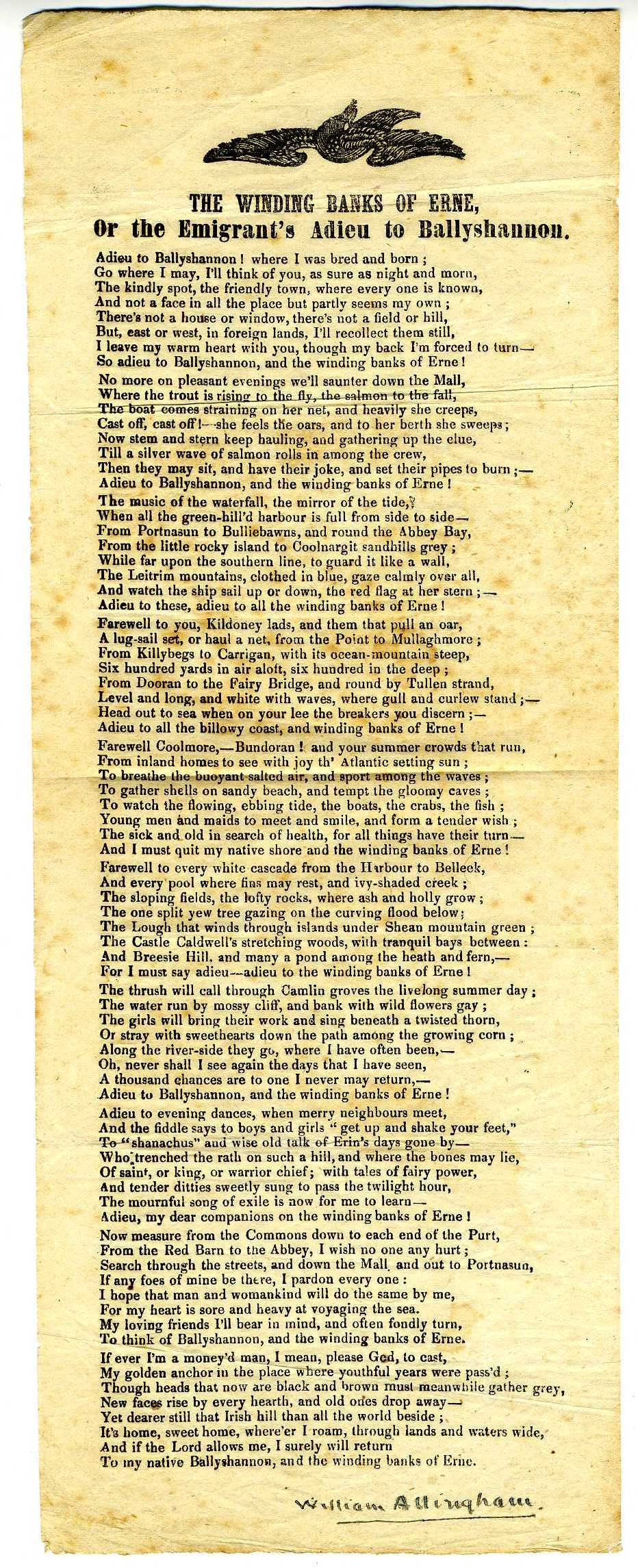
Early broadsheet version of Allingham's "Adieu to Ballyshannon"

He was educated at the Royal Belfast Academical Institution until the age of 14, when he obtained a post in the custom-house of his native town, and held several similar posts in Ireland and England until 1870. During this period were published his Poems (1850; which included his well-known poem, "The Fairies") and Day and Night Songs (1855; illustrated by Dante Gabriel Rossetti and others). Rossetti's Letters to Allingham (1854–1870), edited by Birkbeck Hill, were published in 1897. Laurence Bloomfield in Ireland, his most ambitious, though not his most successful work, a narrative poem illustrative of Irish social questions, appeared in 1864. He also edited The Ballad Book for the Golden Treasury series in 1864, and Fifty Modern Poems in 1865.

In April 1870 Allingham retired from the customs service, moved to London and became sub-editor of Fraser's Magazine, eventually becoming editor in succession to James Froude in June 1874, a post he would hold till 1879. On 22 August 1874 he married the illustrator, Helen Paterson, who was twenty-four years younger than he. His wife gave up her work as an illustrator and would become well known under her married name as a water-colour painter. At first the couple lived in London, at 12 Trafalgar Square, Chelsea, near Allingham's friend, Thomas Carlyle, and it was there that they had their first two children: Gerald Carlyle (born November 1875) and Eva Margaret (born February 1877). In 1877 appeared Allingham's Songs, Poems and Ballads. In 1881, after the death of Carlyle, the Allinghams moved to Sandhills near Witley in Surrey, where their third child, Henry William, was born in 1882. At this period Allingham published Evil May Day (1883), Blackberries (1884) and Irish Songs and Poems (1887).

John George Adair was known for the evictions of forty-seven families in Derryveagh, County Donegal, Ireland, in 1861. Overnight, 244 men, women and children were evicted from their homes and left to wander the roads seeking shelter. This terrible event earned him the title "Black Jack Adair". It triggered William Allingham to write the poem The Eviction.

In 1888, because of Allingham's declining health, they moved back to the capital, to the heights of Hampstead village. But on 18 November 1889, he died at Hampstead. According to his wishes, he was cremated. His ashes are interred at St. Anne's church in his native Ballyshannon.

Posthumously, Allingham's Varieties in Prose were published in 1893. William Allingham. A Diary, edited by Helen Allingham and Dollie Radford, was published in 1907. It contains Allingham's reminiscences of Alfred Tennyson, Thomas Carlyle and other writers and artists.

== Assessment and influence ==
Allingham produced much lyrical and descriptive poetry, and the best of his pieces are thoroughly national in spirit and local colouring. His verse is clear, fresh, and graceful. His best-known poem remains his early work, "The Faeries".

Allingham had a substantial influence on W. B. Yeats; while the Ulster poet John Hewitt felt Allingham's impact keenly, and attempted to revive his reputation by editing, and writing an introduction to, The Poems of William Allingham (Oxford University Press & Dolmen Press, 1967). Allingham's wide-ranging anthology of poetry, Nightingale Valley (1862) was the inspiration for the 1923 collection Come Hither by Walter de la Mare.

== Later influences ==
The Allingham Arms Hotel in Bundoran, County Donegal is named after him.

We daren't go a-hunting / For fear of little men […] was quoted by the character of The Tinker near the beginning of the movie Willy Wonka & the Chocolate Factory, as well as in Mike Mignola's comic book short story Hellboy: The Corpse, plus the 1973 horror film Don't Look in the Basement. The lines Up the airy mountain / Down the rushy glen […] form part of the character Magrat's internal monologue in the Discworld novel Lords and Ladies. Several lines of the poem are quoted by Henry Flyte, a character in issue No. 65 of the Supergirl comic book, August 2011. This same poem was quoted in Andre Norton's 1990 science fiction novel Dare to Go A-Hunting (ISBN 0-812-54712-8).

Up the Airy Mountain is the title of a short story by Debra Doyle and James D. Macdonald; while the working title of Terry Pratchett's The Wee Free Men was "For Fear of Little Men".

== See also ==
- Celtic Revival
- Leigh Hunt
- Pre-Raphaelite Brotherhood
- Thomas Moore

== Bibliography ==
- William Allingham; Helen Allingham and Dollie Radford (eds.): William Allingham. A Diary (London: Macmillan, 1907).
  - The Diaries (London: Folio Society, 1990), with an introduction by John Julius Norwich.
