= Sarah Smith Herford =

British painter (1791–1831)

- Born: Sarah Smith; 1791; Birmingham, England
- Died: 30 October 1831 (aged 40); Altrincham, England
- Spouse: John Herford
- Children: Laura, Mary Chance, William Henry, Brooke, Edward

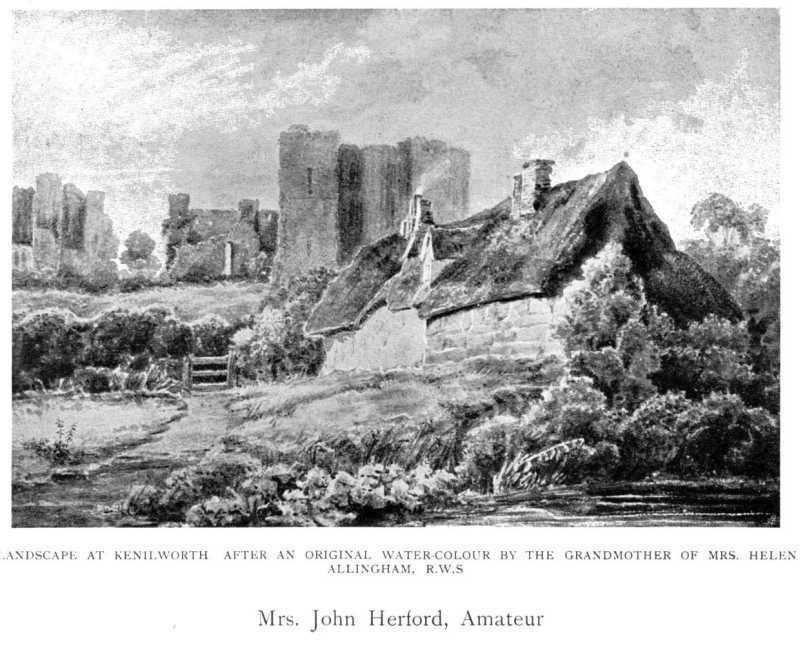
Landscape at Kenilworth by Sarah Smith Herford (1905)

Sarah Smith Herford (bapt. 14 May 1791 – 30 October 1831), also known as Mrs. John Herford, was an English landscape painter and educator.

Sarah was the daughter of Edward and Sarah Smith of Birmingham, and was baptised Unitarian in Aston. In 1812, she married John Herford. She founded the Unitarian Boarding School for Girls in Altrincham, Cheshire. Among her children were sons Brooke, Edward, and William Henry Herford, and daughters Mary Chance and Laura Herford. Mary Chance became the mother of the painter Helen Allingham, whom Sarah Herford was said to have inspired.

She died in Altrincham aged only 40. A Birmingham newspaper lamented her loss as "An impressive instance of worth, talents, and acquirements, cut off in their mid-day of energy and usefulness." Sarah Herford's work Landscape at Kenilworth was included in the book Women Painters of the World.
