= Loading Timber at Southampton Docks =

Painting by C.R.W. Nevinson

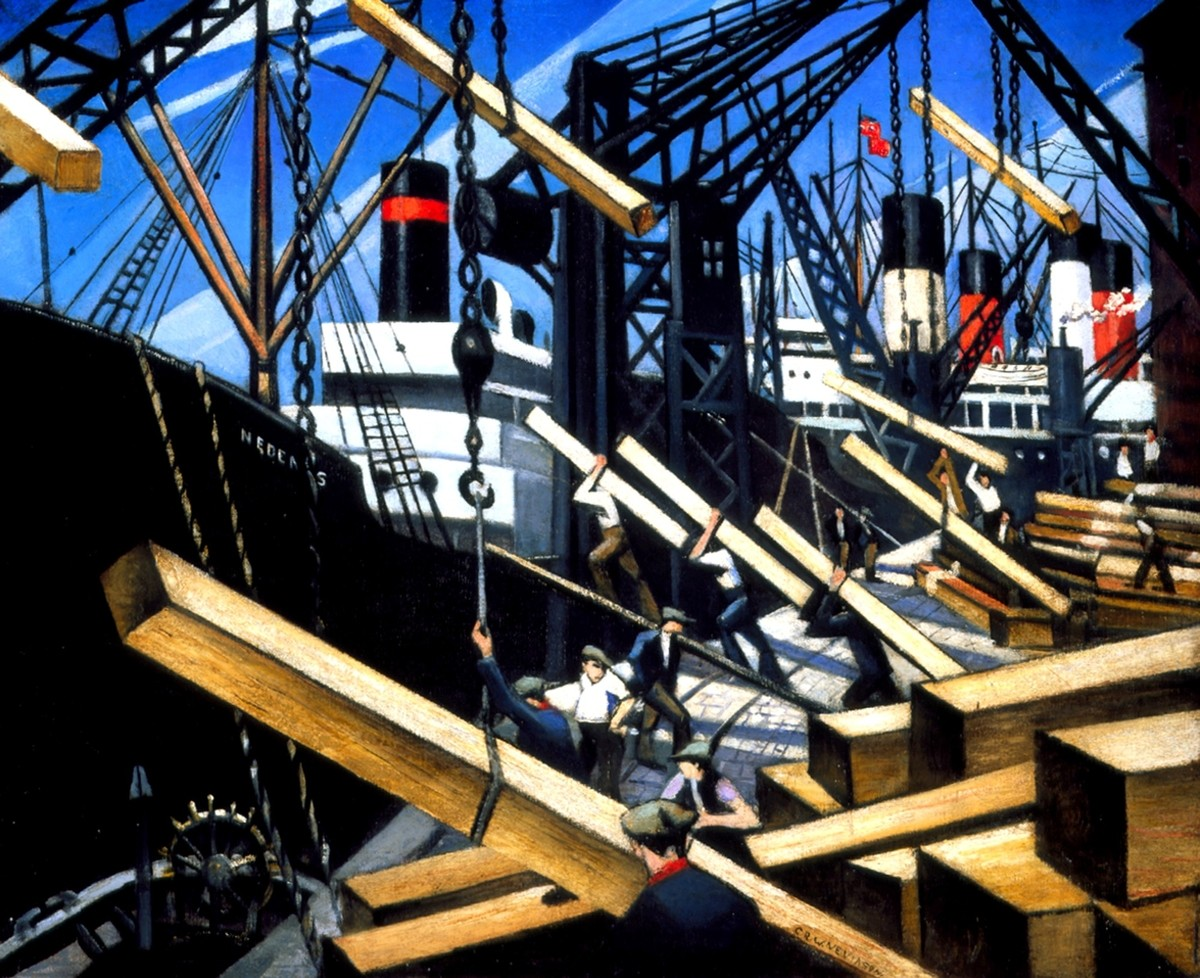
- Artist: C.R.W. Nevinson
- Year: 1917
- Type: Oil on canvas, genre painting
- Dimensions: 51 cm × 61 cm (20 in × 24 in)
- Location: Southampton Art Gallery, Southampton

Loading Timber at Southampton Docks is an oil on canvas genre painting by the British artist C.R.W. Nevinson, from 1917.

== History and description ==
It depicts dockers loading timber aboard a ship at the Port of Southampton. The artist had passed through the docks during the First World War on his way to France where he produced many paintings of the Western Front.

Nevinson was strongly influenced by Italian futurism and the painting uses the style of the movement including the zigzagging composition. The painting is in the collection of the Southampton City Art Gallery, which it acquired it in 1962.

== Bibliography ==
- Fowler, Alan & Taylor, Brandon. Elements of Abstraction: Space, Line & Interval in Modern British Art. Southampton City Art Gallery, 2005.
