= Frederick Lee Bridell =

English painter

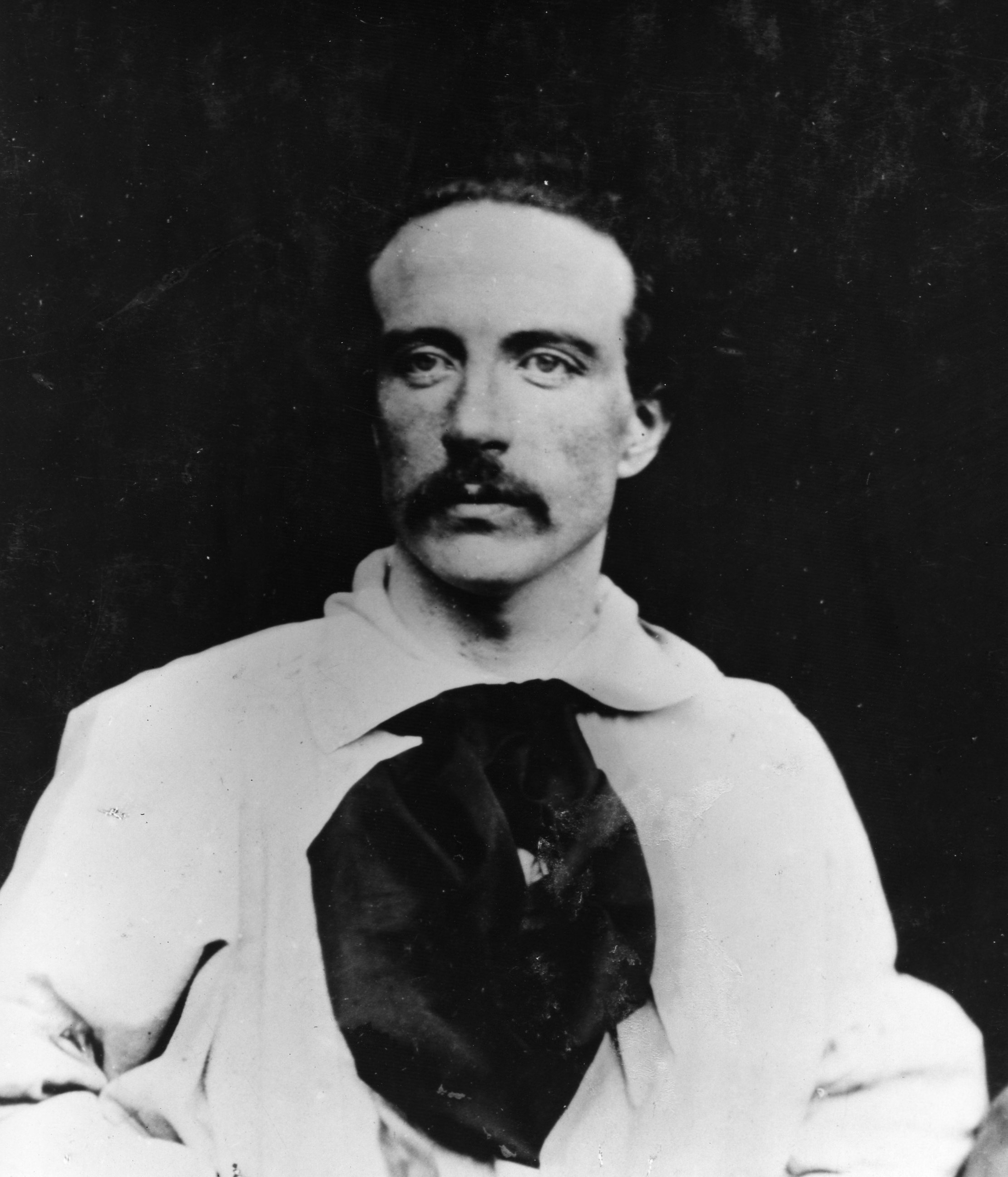
- A photograph of Bridell aged 27
- Born: William Frederick Bridle c 5 December 1830; Southampton, England
- Died: 20 August 1863 (aged 32); Kensington
- Known for: Painter
- Notable work: The Coliseum at Rome by Moonlight
- Movement: Romantic
- Patrons: James Wolff

Frederick Lee Bridell (baptised 5 December 1830 – 20 August 1863) was a popular painter of 19th century Britain, initially as a portrait artist. He gained favour with Elizabeth Barrett Browning who entertained him and his wife (Eliza Bridell Fox, a fellow artist), for their wedding meal at Bocca di Leone, Rome in 1859.

His early professional career was as an apprentice to a picture dealer (Edwin Holder) who had him copy pictures by Old Masters and also funded his education abroad.

== Early life and influences ==
Bridell was the third child and only son of John Bridle, carpenter, and Amelia (formerly Bartlett), living in Houndwell. He received basic schooling and left at an early age in order to earn a living. We learn from Henry Rose, that he was drawing avidly and ‘writing verse’ from the age of nine. Rose, in two letters to the Southampton Times in 1888, provided detail of Bridell's early years and his subsequent apprenticeship to a picture restorer, Edwin Holder. At the age of eighteen years, William Bridle, had taken up portrait painting and was signing his work, Frederick Lee Bridell. One of the earliest portraits (Southampton Art Gallery coll.) was of Henry Rose, and this was shown to Edwin Holder who recognised his talent.

Bridell took up residence with Holder's family near Bray in Berkshire. From here he submitted his first work to the Royal Academy in 1851 entitled A Bit in Berkshire. Two years later he went to the Continent.

After a short period in Paris, where he copied works in the Louvre, he established himself in Munich. Here he became influenced by the Dutch School, copying works by Cuyp, Van der Velde and Berchem.

He was inspired by the mountainous landscape of the Tyrol, and its wooded valleys. Returning to England in 1855, he completed works from his sketches abroad and completed numerous commissions for the well-to-do of Southampton. He began to exhibit at the Royal Academy, the British Institution and the Liverpool Academy.

Within two years, the artist had acquired a patron, James Wolff, a shipping magnate of Bevois Mount. Wolff established a Bridell gallery at his home and allowed visitors to view the paintings. Bridell set up his studio at Highfield Lodge and began a large work The Temple of Venus (90x60ins).

The essence of Bridell's work is the depiction of vastness in nature, large areas of landscape within which light moves through the scene, highlighting form and shadow. In his subjects, Bridell was much influenced by Turner, but he remained true to his own style. The Temple of Venus, Bridell hoped would one day hang between the Turners and Claudes in the National Gallery. The present location of this work is unknown, last appearing at auction in 1913.

== Italian period ==
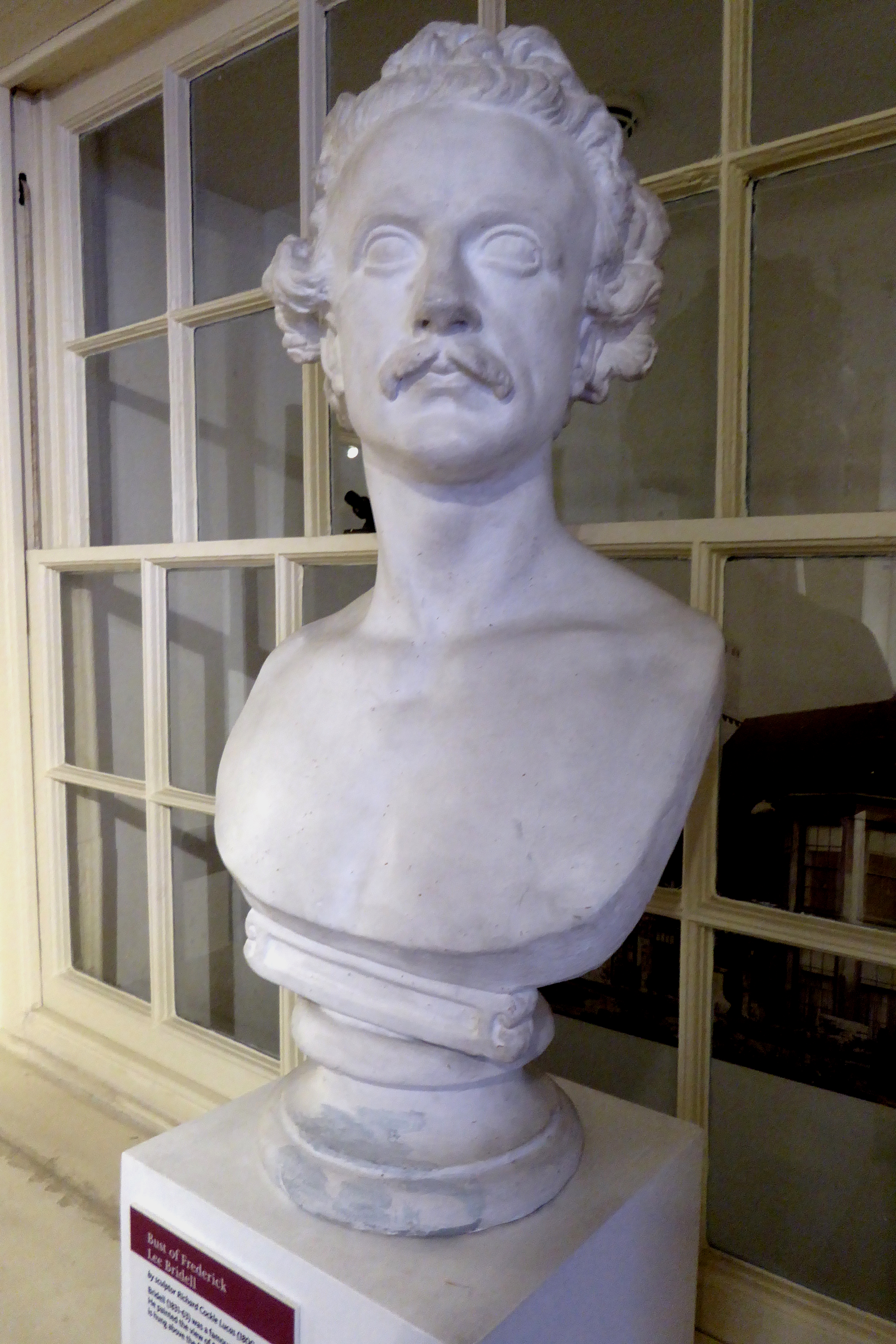
Bust of Bridell on display in the Tudor House, Southampton

Freed from financial constraint, Bridell was able to travel to Italy in the autumn of 1858. He set up a studio in Rome, near the Spanish Steps, in December of that year. There are entertaining descriptions of life in the city at this time, written by Nathaniel Hawthorne. Both he and his wife were interested in the culture and art and wrote details of their visits in French and Italian notebooks. In Rome in 1859, Bridell met and married Eliza Fox, an artist, and the daughter of a Unitarian minister and politician, William Johnson Fox. She was known to influential writers and thinkers of the time, and Robert Browning ‘gave her away’ at the ceremony. The newly wedded couple had their ‘wedding dinner’ at the Browning's apartment in Bocca di Leone. Two days later they were both painting at their respective studios.

Bridell, freed from the deprivation of his early years, embarked on his most prolific period. In Italy, he completed monumental works inspired by the landscape near Rome. It was however, in the vicinity of the Italian Lakes that he was most inspired to paint.

Returning to England in 1863, he died of consumption in Kensington in August of that year and was buried in Brompton Cemetery. He was outlived by both parents and a sister.

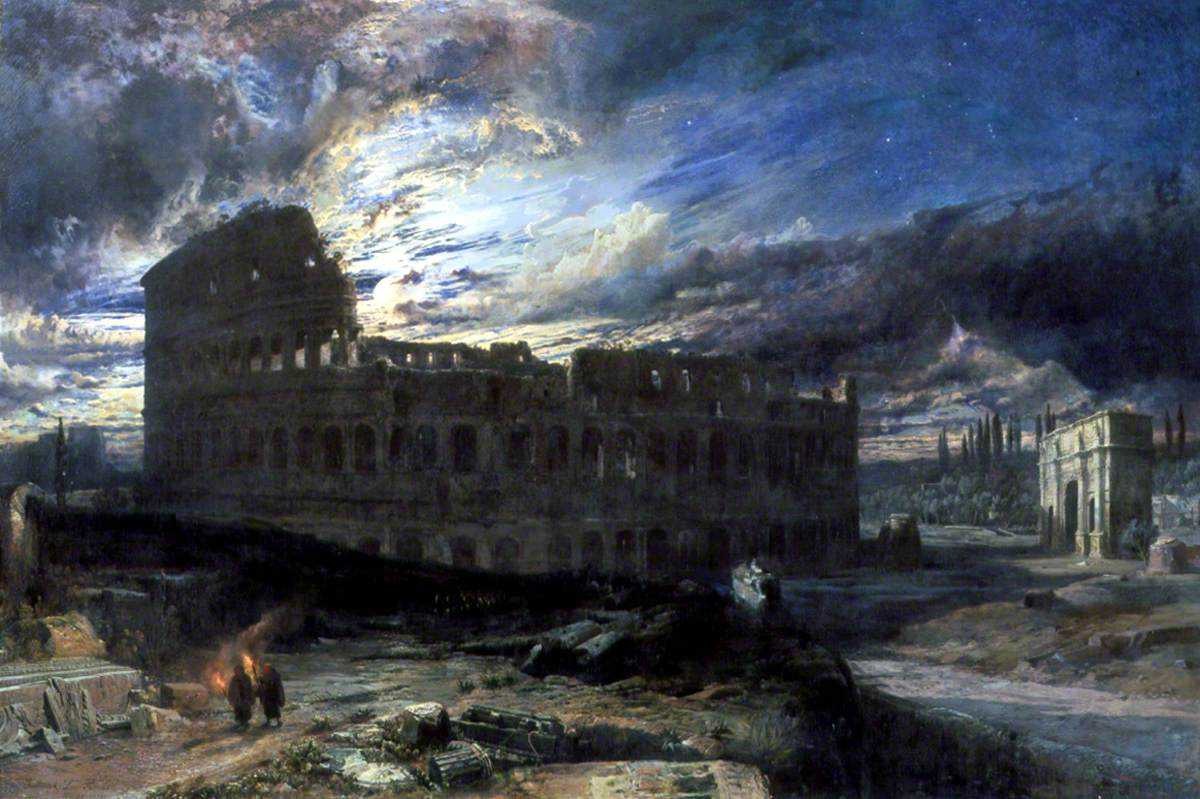
The Coliseum at Rome by Moonlight, 1859

The following year, possibly for financial reasons, Wolff sent his Bridell Gallery to Christie's. The sale on 27/2/1864 included the following which were never to be seen together again.

- The Temple of Venus,
- The Coliseum at Rome by Moonlight (Southampton Art Gallery),
- Lake Constance,
- The Temple of Vesta,
- Ave Maria at Bolzano (private coll.)
- The Fortress Ehrenbreitstein,
- Grand Sunrise from Stonehenge,
- Etruscan Tombs at Civita Castellana (74 x 47ins)
- The Villa D’Este (74 x 47 ins)
- Under the Pine Trees
- Castel Fusano (49 x 72ins)
- Grotto of Neptune (49 x72ins)

Writing Bridell's obituary, Sir Theodore Martin stated,

‘Had he lived, he must have earned a European reputation; and numerous and fine as are the works he has left, his early death is, in the interests of Art, deeply to be deplored. We have only to add, that in manners Mr. Bridell was simple, amiable and modest. Firm without self-assertion, sincere without being obtrusive, we can believe he was beloved by his friends, as most certainly he was respected by those whose knowledge of him was comparatively slight’.
