= Portrait of Lord Vernon =

Painting by Thomas Gainsborough

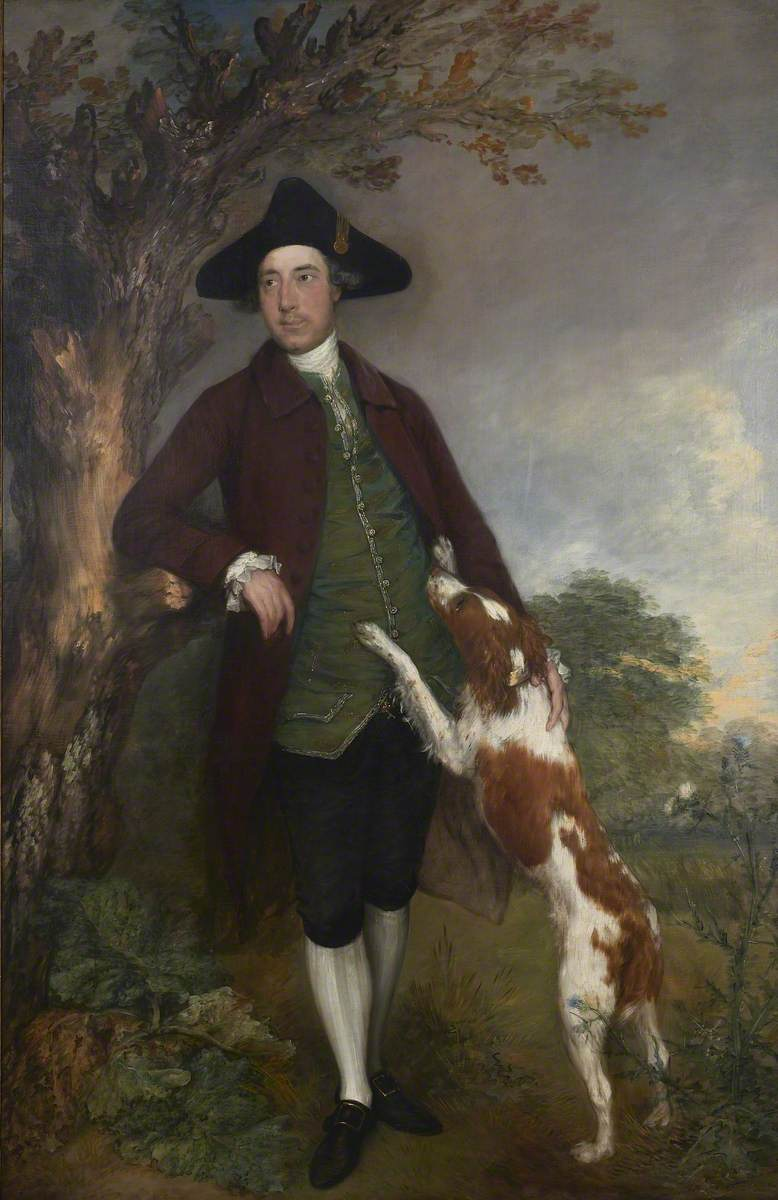
- Artist: Thomas Gainsborough
- Year: 1767
- Type: Oil on canvas, portrait painting
- Dimensions: 246.3 cm × 150 cm (97.0 in × 59 in)
- Location: Southampton City Art Gallery; Southampton

Portrait of Lord Vernon is a 1767 portrait painting by the British artist Thomas Gainsborough It depicts the English aristocrat George Venables-Vernon, 2nd Baron Vernon. He shown at full-length, poised against a tree wkith a dog affectionately climbing on him. He was at the time the heir to his father George Venables-Vernon, 1st Baron Vernon, and succeeded to the title in 1780.

At the time Gainsborough was based in the fashionable spa town of Bath where executed portraits of the elite who visited the resort. The painting was displayed at the Exhibition of 1767 held at Pall Mall. Although based in Bath, Gainsborough regularly exhibited his paintings at the Society of Artists of Great Britain in London and was later a founding member of the Royal Academy of Arts in the capital. Today the painting is in the collection of Southampton City Art Gallery, having been acquired in 1957.

== Bibliography ==
- Rosenthal, Michael & Myrone, Martin. Thomas Gainsborough. Harry N. Abrams, 2002
- Spencer-Longhurst, Paul & Brooke, Janet M. Thomas Gainsborough: The Harvest Wagon. Birmingham Museums and Art Gallery, 1995.
