= Laura Herford =

Anne Laura Herford (1831–1870) was a British artist in the early 19th century, and in 1860, was the first woman to be admitted to the Royal Academy schools. She exhibited at the Royal Academy twelve times.

== Early career ==
Herford was born on 16 October 1831 to John Herford and Sarah Smith Herford. She studied under Eliza Fox (1824–1903), an artist best known for her genre and portraiture scenes which incorporated contemporary social commentary. Herford and Fox signed the 1859 petition to admit women to the Royal Academy. Herford applied under the name 'L. Hereford' and became a pupil in 1861 as the only woman at the academy. She exhibited at the Royal Academy from 1861 to 1869 and also at the Suffolk Street Gallery and the British Institution. Hereford exhibited in 1864 a picture entitled A Quiet Corner, and followed up her success by similar domestic scenes in 1865, 1866, and 1867.

== Admittance to the Royal Academy ==
After encouragement from Charles Eastlake and Thomas Heatherley, Herford submitted several drawings to the academy's admissions tutors signed "L. Herford". The use of initials masked her gender, leading to the assumption that she was a man. She was admitted and an offer was made to "L. Herford, Esq" and she took up her place at the academy in 1860.

== Bibliography ==
- Bryan, Michael (1904). Bryan's Dictionary of Painters and Engravers (Public domain ed.). Macmillan.
- Potter, Matthew (2013). The Concept of the 'master' in Art Education in Britain and Ireland, 1770 to the Present. Ashgate Publishing, Ltd. ISBN 978-1-4094-3555-6.
