= Eliza Bridell Fox =

British painter

- Born: 1824; London Borough of Hackney
- Died: 1903 (aged 78–79)

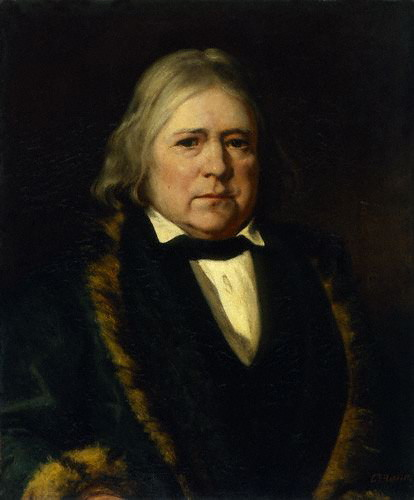
Portrait of her father, William Johnson Fox in 1862

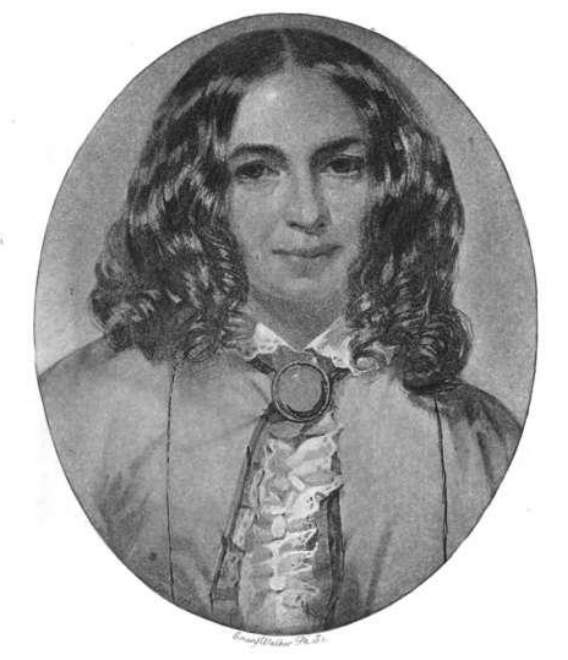
Portrait of Elizabeth Barrett Browning, drawn in 1859 in Rome

Eliza Bridell Fox, née Eliza Florance Fox (1824–1903), was a British painter and teacher.

== Family background ==
She was born in Hackney as the daughter of William Johnson Fox, preacher and politician, Unitarian minister of the South Place Chapel, and Eliza née Florance. He was a friend of radical journalist Benjamin Flower. On Flower's death in 1829, his two daughters, Eliza Flower and Sarah Fuller Flower Adams, became William Johnson Fox's wards. Mr and Mrs Fox separated in the 1830s, and, causing much scandal, her father apparently took her and her siblings to set up home with Eliza Flower. This unconventional family unit lived first in Stamford Hill and later Bayswater.

== Education and early career ==
Eliza Fox was known as 'Tottie', and had initially wanted to go on the stage, though her father (despite his habit of lying on a sofa, giving Shakespearean readings), was nervous about this. He consulted his friend William Macready, who told her she was too small, and so she took up art at the age of twenty. While her father believed in the value of an education for women, he felt that the art of drawing was unnecessary, leading Eliza initially to study by herself. Eliza became a copyist by first studying Bernhard Siegfried Albinus' Anatomy, which her father bought for her, and later, by copying paintings in the National Gallery and the British Museum. Receiving encouragement from artists, she finally convinced her father to let her study for three years at Sass's Academy under the directorship of Francis Stephen Cary. Here she studied alongside Anna Mary Howitt, who had a career as a painter and writer, and whose parents were friends of the novelist Elizabeth Gaskell. According to Ellen Creathorne Clayton, author of English Female Artists, Eliza exhibited 'a careful crayon portrait of her father' at the Royal Academy shortly after her graduation in 1847. However, the seventy-ninth royal academy exhibition shows no entry by miss Fox that year. Clayton also stated that she exhibited 'her first oil painting' Gainsborough when a boy sketching from Nature the next year. It is not clear where it was exhibited. The royal academy catalogue of 1848 mentions only two entries by 'miss Fox', a portrait of Herbert Sancton Wood (735) and a portrait of the English historian Sharon Turner (998) in the section drawings and miniatures.

She then started to hold drawing evenings at home in her father's library where she and other women artists could draw from "undraped" (i.e. nude) models. In April 1859, 38 female artists, including Eliza F. Bridell (late Fox), sent a letter/petition to the Royal Academy Academicians requesting entry for women, which was initially rejected. This petition was published in The Athenæum on the 30th of April. After a few years she began instruction with the purpose of educating women to the point that they would qualify for admittance to the Royal Academy schools, and one of her students, Laura Herford, succeeded on the basis of a drawing that only included her first initials. Herford was admitted to the Antique School as the first woman to do so.

In 1849, she first met Elizabeth Gaskell, who had recently gained much notice through her first novel Mary Barton, and they subsequently became close friends.

== Marriages and later career ==
In 1858 Fox went to Rome, where she married Frederick Lee Bridell the next year. She remained in Italy, painting alongside her husband and accompanying him on trips until he died in 1862. In this period she is known for portraits of visiting friends and their company. She then took a long trip to Algiers where she continued to make portraits of visitors. In 1871 she remarried a second time to her cousin George Edward Fox, and resumed her maiden name.
