= Women artists =

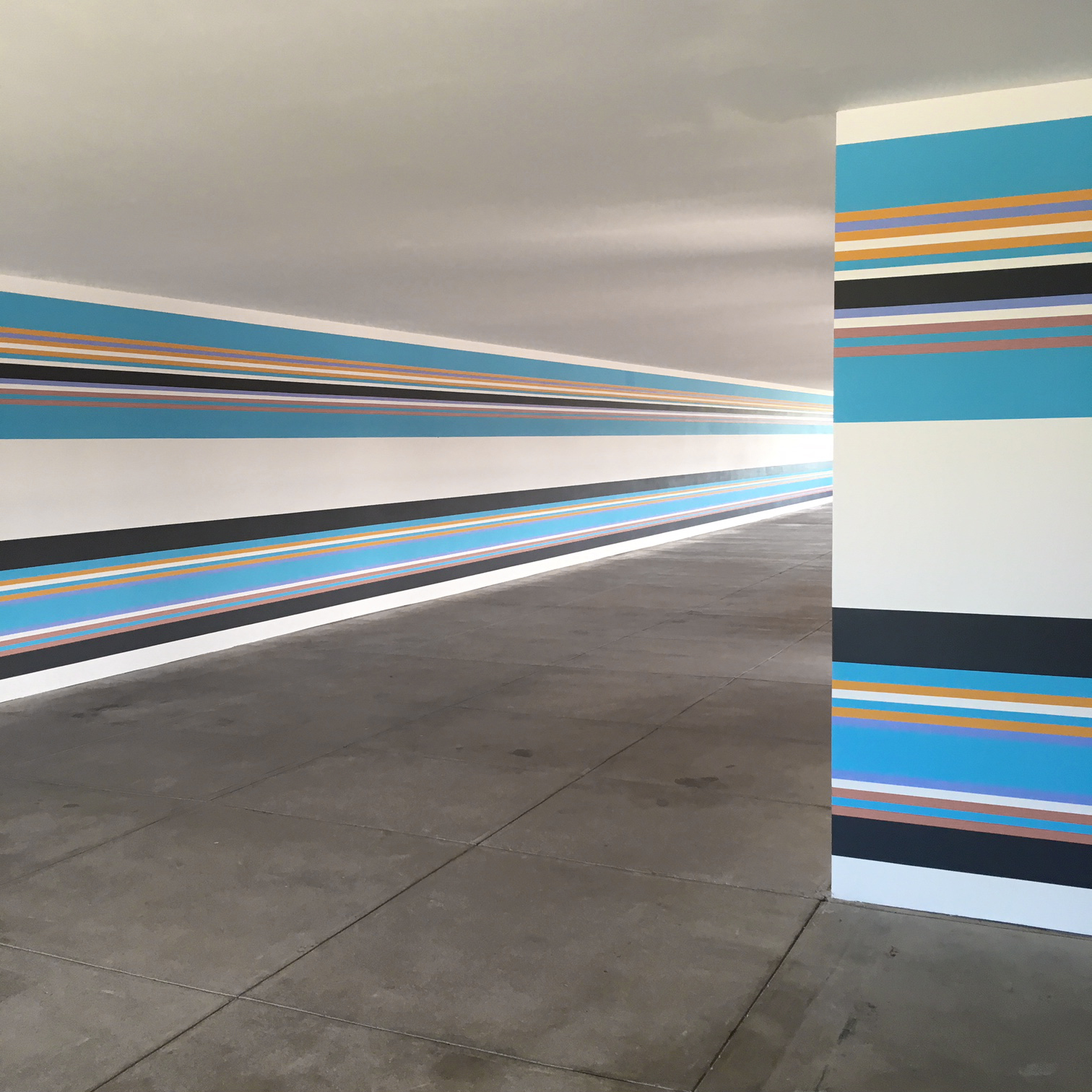
Bridget Riley, Bolt of Colour, 2017–2019 Chinati Foundation, Marfa, Texas

The absence of women from the canon of Western art has been a subject of inquiry and reconsideration since the early 1970s. Linda Nochlin's influential 1971 essay, "Why Have There Been No Great Women Artists?", examined the social and institutional barriers that blocked most women from entering artistic professions throughout history, prompting a new focus on women artists, their art and experiences, and contributed inspiration to the Feminist art movement. Although women artists have been involved in the making of art throughout history, their work, when compared to that of their male counterparts, has been often obfuscated, overlooked and undervalued. The Western canon has historically valued men's work over women's and attached gendered stereotypes to certain media, such as textile or fiber arts, to be primarily associated with women.

Women artists have been challenged by a lack of access to artistic education, professional networks, and exhibition opportunities. Beginning in the late 1960s and 1970s, feminist artists and art historians involved in the Feminist art movement have addressed the role of women especially in the Western art world, how world art is perceived, evaluated or appropriated according to gender.

== Prehistoric era ==
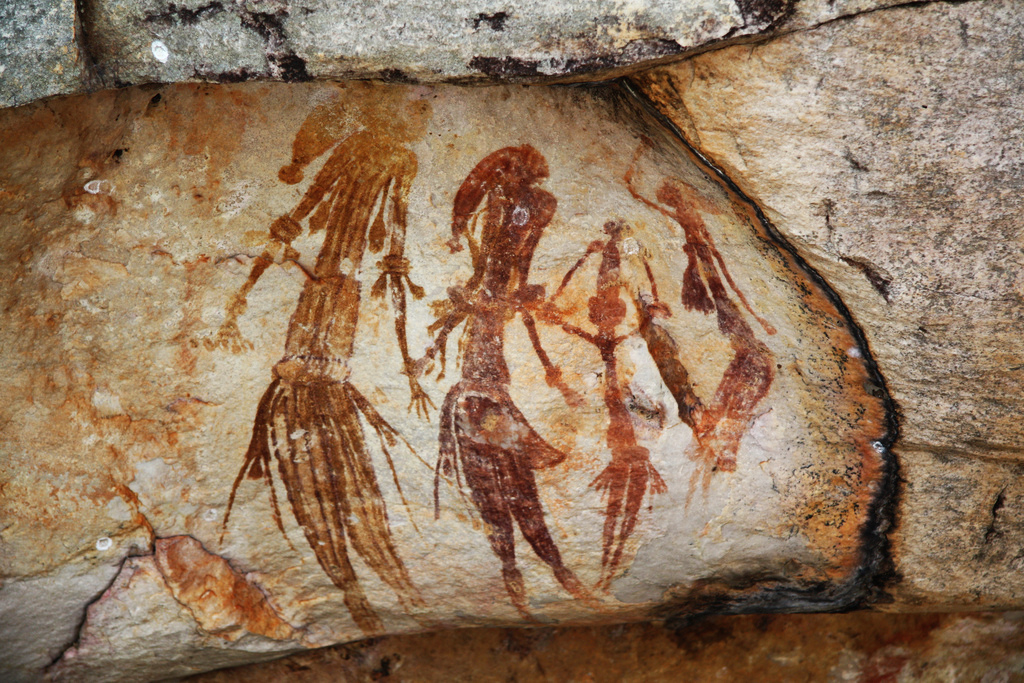
Gwion Gwion rock paintings found in the north-west Kimberley region of Western Australia

There are no records of who the artists of the prehistoric eras were, but studies of many early ethnographers and cultural anthropologists indicate that women often were the principal artisans in Neolithic cultures, in which they created pottery, textiles, baskets, painted surfaces and jewellery. Collaboration on large projects was common if not typical. Extrapolation to the artwork and skills of the Paleolithic era suggests that these cultures followed similar patterns. Cave paintings of this era often have human hand prints, 75% of which are identifiable as women's.

=== Ceramic art ===
There is a long history of ceramic art in almost all developed cultures, and often ceramic objects are all the artistic evidence left from vanished cultures, like that of the Nok culture in Africa over 3,000 years ago. Cultures especially noted for ceramics include the Chinese, Cretan, Greek, Persian, Mayan, Japanese, and Korean cultures, as well as the modern Western cultures. There is evidence that pottery was independently invented in several regions of the world, including East Asia, Sub-Saharan Africa, The Near East, and the Americas. It is unknown who the artisans were.

== Ancient historical era ==
=== Classical Europe and the Middle East ===
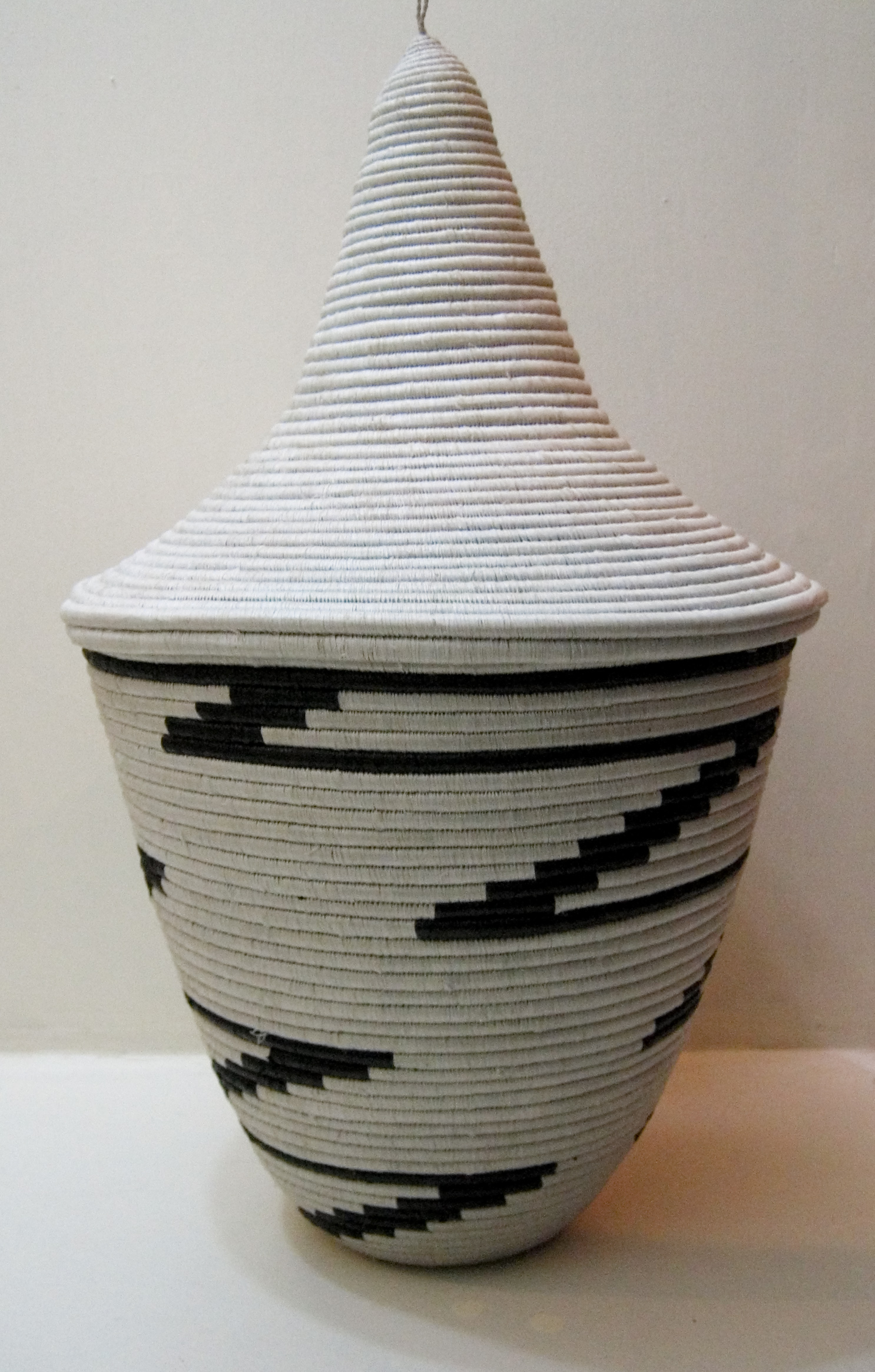
Igiseke, traditional woven basket made by women in the Rift valley region

The earliest records of western cultures rarely mention specific individuals, although women are depicted in all of the art and some are shown laboring as artists. Ancient references by Homer, Cicero, and Virgil mention the prominent roles of women in textiles, poetry, music, and other cultural activities, without discussion of individual artists. Among the earliest European historical records concerning individual artists is that of Pliny the Elder, who wrote about a number of Greek women who were painters, including Helena of Egypt, daughter of Timon of Egypt, Some modern critics posit that Alexander Mosaic might not have been the work of Philoxenus, but of Helena of Egypt. One of the few named women painters who might have worked in Ancient Greece, she was reputed to have produced a painting of the battle of Issus which hung in the Temple of Peace during the time of Vespasian. Other women include Timarete, Eirene, Kalypso, Aristarete, Iaia, and Olympias. While only some of their work survives, in Ancient Greek pottery there is a caputi hydria in the Torno Collection in Milan. It is attributed to the Leningrad painter from c. 460–450 BCE and shows women working alongside men in a workshop where both painted vases.

=== India ===
"For about three thousand years, the women – and only the women – of Mithila have been making devotional paintings of the gods and goddesses of the Hindu pantheon. It is no exaggeration, then, to say that this art is the expression of the most genuine aspect of Indian civilization."

=== African continent ===
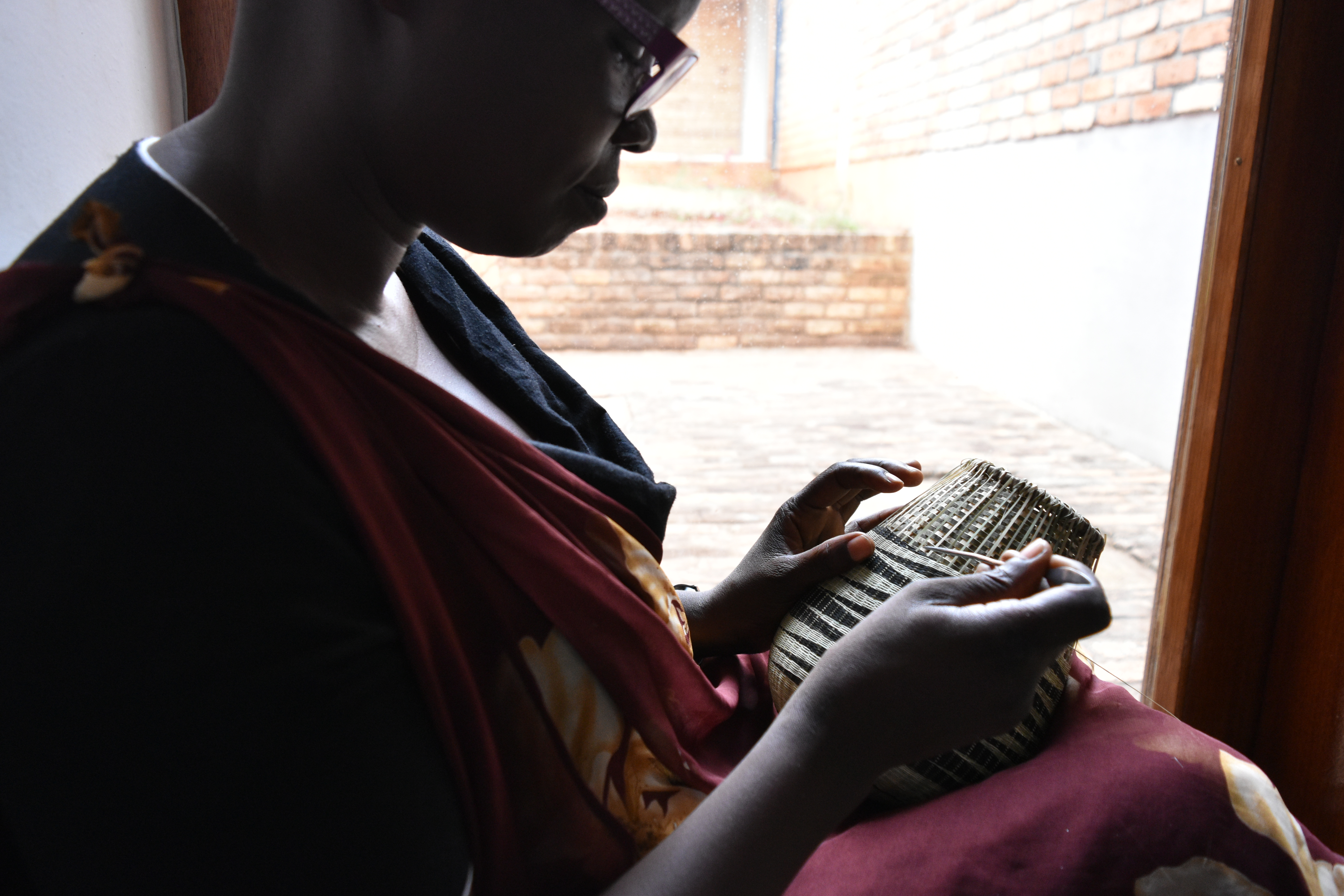
Traditional basket weaving in Rwanda and Burundi

The geometric Imigongo art originated from Rwanda in East Africa, and is associated with the centuries-old sacred status of the cow. It evolved from mixing cow dung with ash and clay and the use of natural dyes. The palette is limited to the bold colour of the earth. The art is traditionally associated with women artists, as is the elaborate art of basket weaving of the area, with its own regular friezes.

== Europe ==
=== Medieval period ===
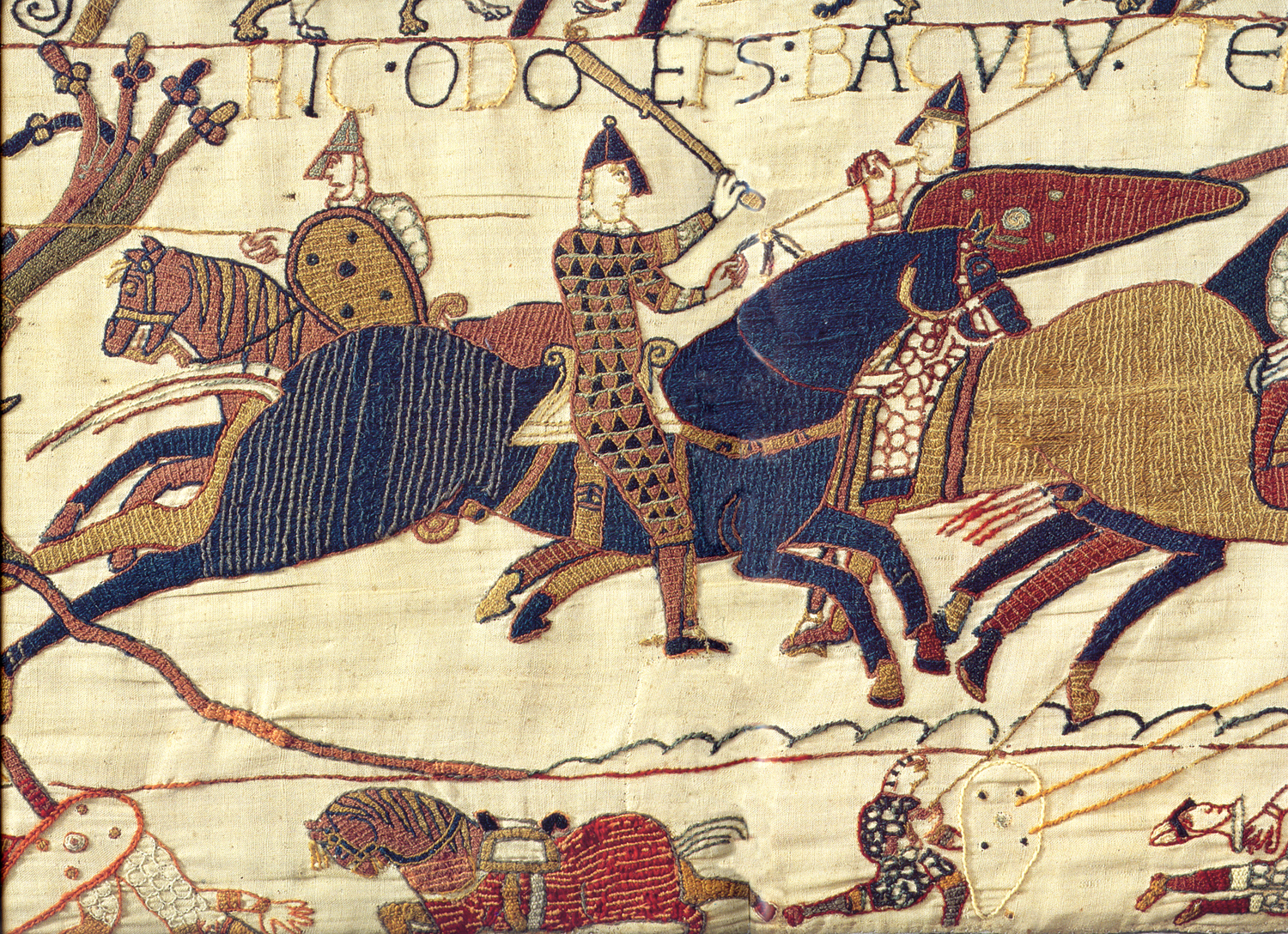
A scene from the Bayeux Tapestry depicting Odo, Bishop of Bayeux, rallying Duke William's troops during the Battle of Hastings in 1066

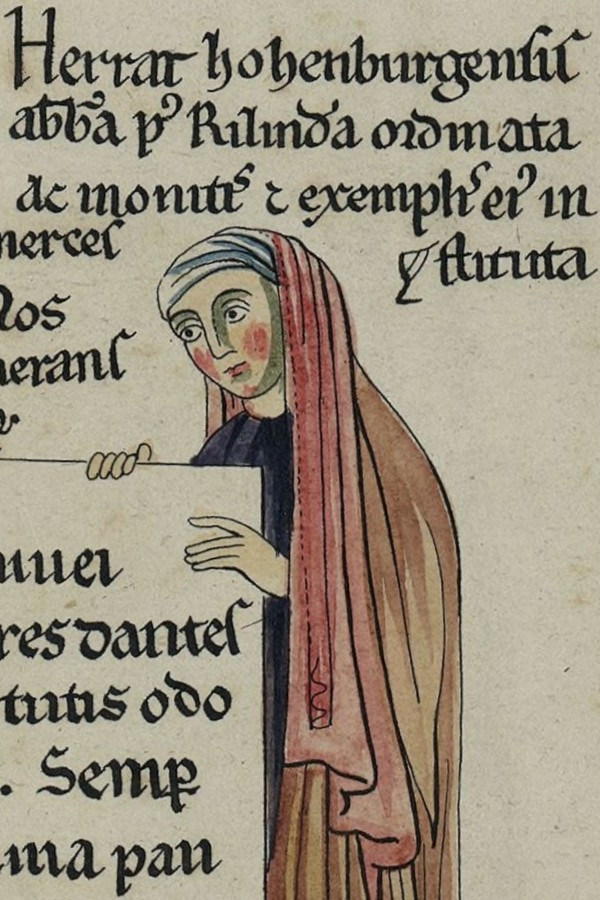
Herrad of Landsberg, Self portrait from Hortus deliciarum, c. 1180

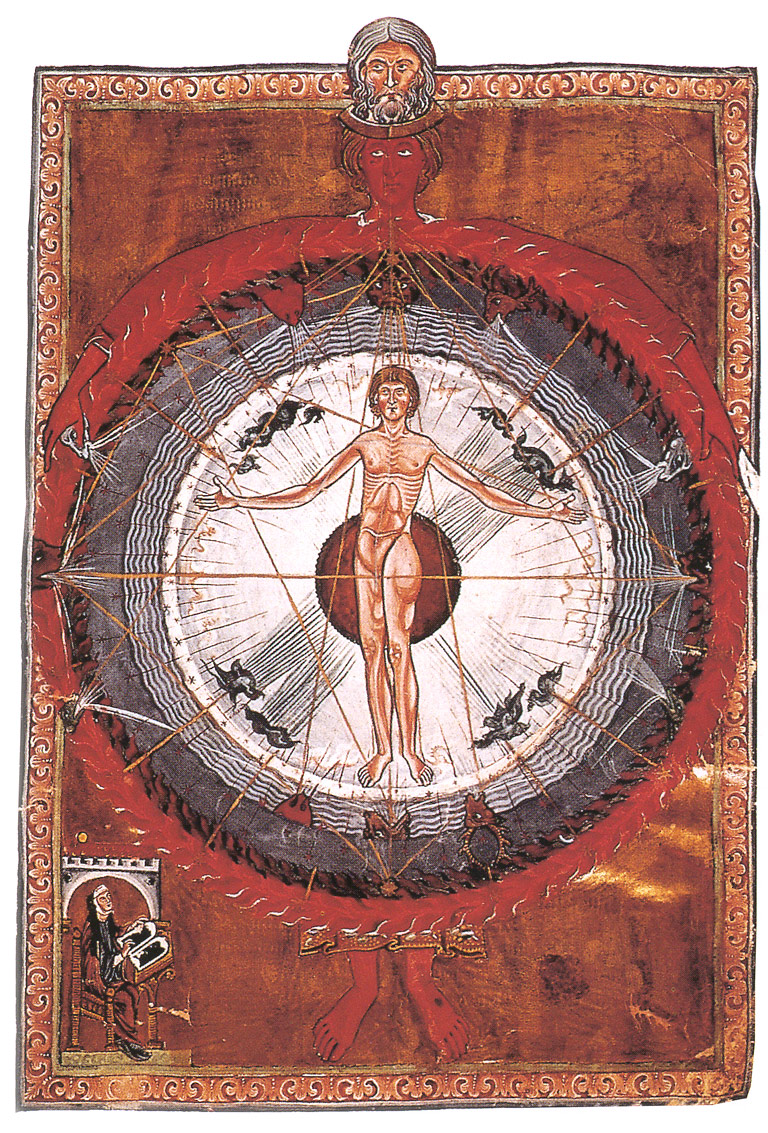
Hildegard of Bingen, "Universal Man" illumination from Hildegard's Liber Divinorum Operum, 1165

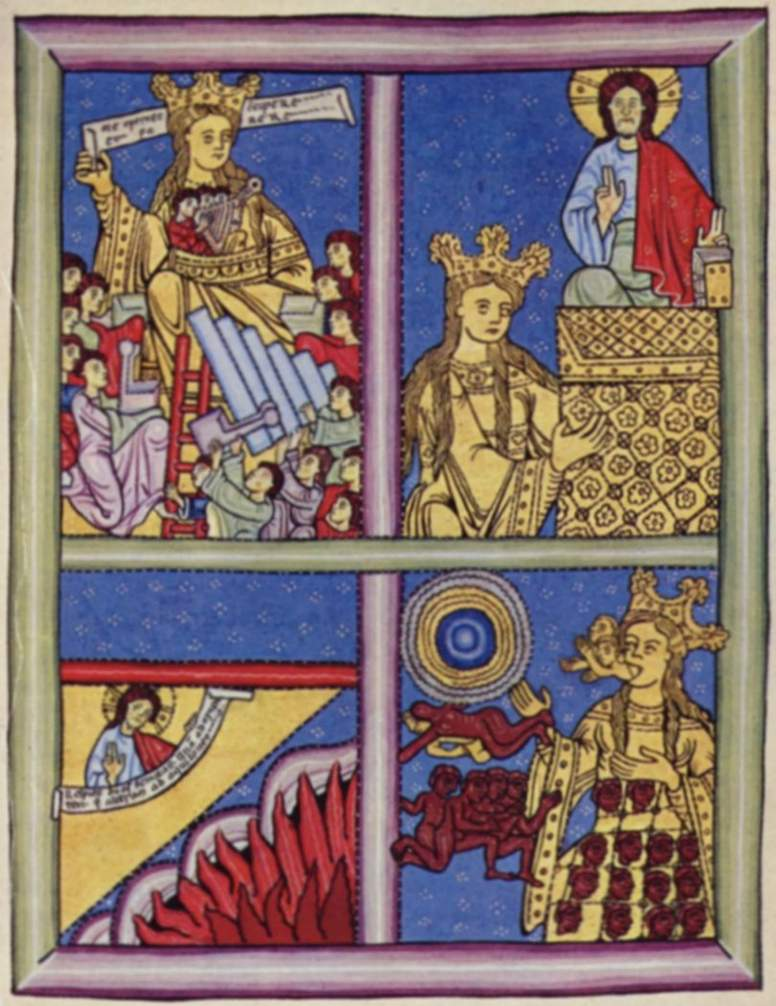
Hildegard von Bingen, Motherhood from the Spirit and the Water, 1165, from Liber divinorum operum, Benediktinerinnenabtei Sankt Hildegard, Eibingen (bei Rüdesheim)

Artists from the Medieval period include Claricia, Diemudus, Ende, Guda, Herrade of Landsberg and Hildegard of Bingen. In the early medieval period, women often worked alongside men. Manuscript illuminations, embroideries, and carved capitals from the period clearly demonstrate examples of women at work in these arts. Documents show that they also were brewers, butchers, wool merchants, and iron mongers. Artists of the time period, including women, were from a small subset of society whose status allowed them freedom from these more strenuous types of work. Women artists often were of two literate classes, either wealthy aristocratic women or nuns. Women in the former category often created embroideries and textiles; those in the later category often produced illuminations.

There were a number of embroidery workshops in England at the time, particularly at Canterbury and Winchester; Opus Anglicanum or English embroidery was already famous across Europe – a 13th-century papal inventory counted over two hundred pieces. It is presumed that women were almost entirely responsible for this production.

==== The Bayeux Tapestry ====
One of the most famous embroideries (it is not a tapestry) of the medieval period is the Bayeux Tapestry, which was embroidered with wool on nine linen panels and is 230 feet long. Its c. seventy scenes narrate the Battle of Hastings and the Norman Conquest of England. The Bayeux Tapestry may have been created in either a commercial workshop by a royal or an aristocratic lady and her retinue, or in a workshop in a nunnery. Sylvette Lemagnen, conservator of the tapestry, in her 2005 book La Tapisserie de Bayeux states:

The Bayeux tapestry is one of the supreme achievements of the Norman Romanesque .... Its survival almost intact over nine centuries is little short of miraculous ... Its exceptional length, the harmony and freshness of its colours, its exquisite workmanship, and the genius of its guiding spirit combine to make it endlessly fascinating.

=== The High Middle Ages ===
In the 14th century, a royal workshop is documented, based at the Tower of London, and there may have been other earlier arrangements. Manuscript illumination affords us many of the named artists of the Medieval Period including Ende, a 10th-century Spanish nun; Guda, a 12th-century German nun; and Claricia, a 12th-century laywoman in a Bavarian scriptorium. These women, and many more unnamed illuminators, benefited from the nature of convents as the major loci of learning for women in the period and the most tenable option for intellectuals among them.

In many parts of Europe, with the Gregorian Reforms of the 11th century and the rise in feudalism, women faced many strictures that they did not face in the early medieval period. With these societal changes, the status of the convent changed. In the British Isles, the Norman Conquest marked the beginning of the gradual decline of the convent as a seat of learning and a place where women could gain power. Convents were made subsidiary to male abbots, rather than being headed by an abbess, as they had been previously. In pagan Scandinavia (in Sweden) the only historically confirmed female runemaster, Gunnborga, worked in the 11th century.

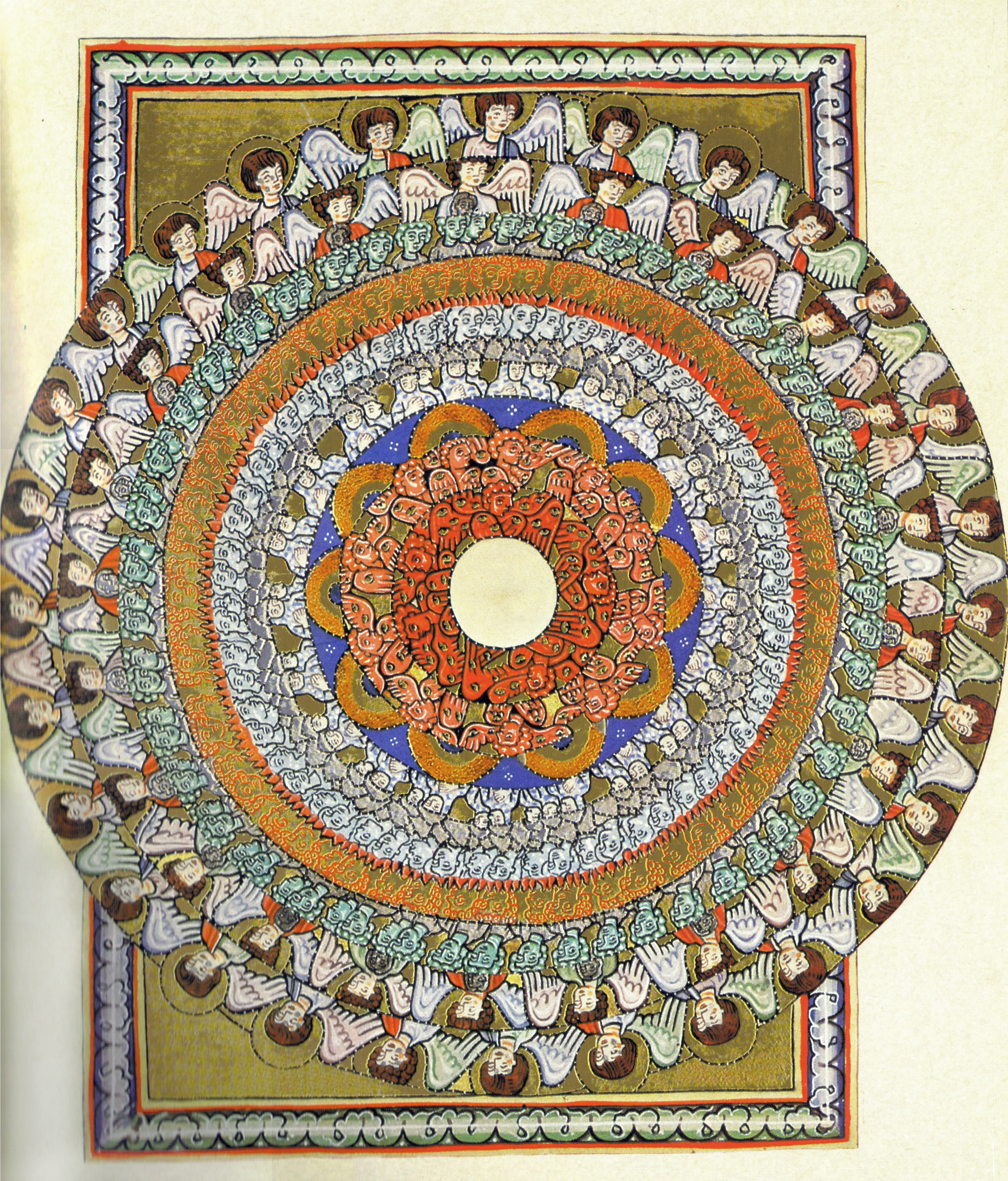
Hildegard of Bingen Scivias I.6: The Choirs of Angels. From the Rupertsberg manuscript, fol. 38r.

In Germany, however, under the Ottonian dynasty, convents retained their position as institutions of learning. This might be partially because convents were often headed and populated by unmarried women from royal and aristocratic families. Therefore, the greatest late medieval period work by women originates in Germany, as exemplified by that of Herrade of Landsberg and Hildegard of Bingen. Hildegard of Bingen (1098–1179) is a particularly fine example of a German medieval intellectual and artist. She wrote The Divine Works of a Simple Man, The Meritorious Life, sixty-five hymns, a miracle play, and a long treatise of nine books on the different natures of trees, plants, animals, birds, fish, minerals, and metals. From an early age, she claimed to have visions. When the Papacy supported these claims by the headmistress, her position as an important intellectual was galvanized. The visions became part of one of her seminal works in 1142, Scivias (Know the Ways of the Lord), which consists of thirty-five visions relating and illustrating the history of salvation. The illustrations in the Scivias, as exemplified in the first illustration, depict Hildegard experiencing visions while seated in the monastery at Bingen. They differ greatly from others created in Germany during the same period, as they are characterized by bright colours, emphasis on line, and simplified forms. While Hildegard likely did not pen the images, their idiosyncratic nature leads one to believe they were created under her close supervision.

The 12th century saw the rise of the city in Europe, along with the rise in trade, travel, and universities. These changes in society also engendered changes in the lives of women. Women were allowed to head their husbands' businesses if they were widowed. The Wife of Bath in Chaucer's The Canterbury Tales is one such case. During this time, women also were allowed to be part of some artisan guilds. Guild records show that women were particularly active in the textile industries in Flanders and Northern France. Medieval manuscripts have many marginalia depicting women with spindles. In England, women were responsible for creating Opus Anglicanum, or rich embroideries for ecclesiastical or secular use on clothes and various types of hangings. Women also became more active in illumination. A number of women likely worked alongside their husbands or fathers, including the daughter of Maître Honoré and the daughter of Jean le Noir. By the 13th century most illuminated manuscripts were being produced by commercial workshops, and by the end of the Middle Ages, when production of manuscripts had become an important industry in certain centres, women seem to have represented a majority of the artists and scribes employed, especially in Paris. The movement to printing, and book illustration to the printmaking techniques of woodcut and engraving, where women seem to have been little involved, represented a setback to the progress of women artists.

Meanwhile, Jefimija (1349–1405) a Serbian, noblewoman, widow and orthodox nun became known not only as a poet who wrote a lament for her dead son, Uglješa, but also as a skilled needlewoman and engraver. Her lament for her beloved son which immortalized the sorrow of all mothers mourning their deceased children, was carved on the back of the diptych, (two-panelled icon representing a Virgin and Child) which Teodosije, Bishop of Serres, had presented as a gift to the infant Uglješa at his baptism. The piece of art, already valuable because of the gold, precious stones, and beautiful carving on its wooden panels, became priceless after Jefemija's lament was engraved on its back.

In 15th-century Venice the daughter of the glass artist, Angelo Barovièr, was known to have been the artist behind a particular glass design from Venetian Murano. She was Marietta Barovier, a Venetian glass artist. Of fourteen specialist glass painters (pictori) documented between 1443 and 1516, she and Elena de Laudo were the only women. Seemingly several centuries had to elapse before women were able to pursue the medium in Glass art.

=== Renaissance ===
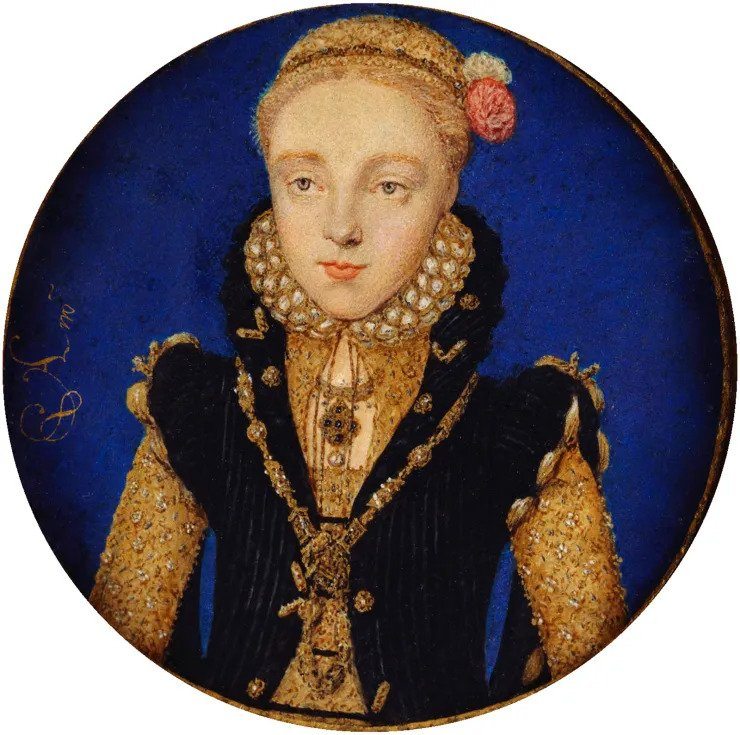
Portrait miniature of Elizabeth I by Levina Teerlinc Levina Teerlinc, Portrait of Elizabeth I. c. 1565

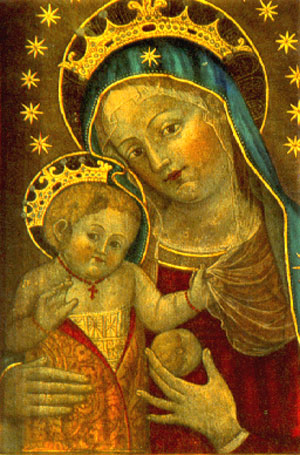
St. Catherine of Bologna (Caterina dei Vigri), (Maria und das Jesuskind mit Frucht), c. 1440s. She is the patroness saint of artists.

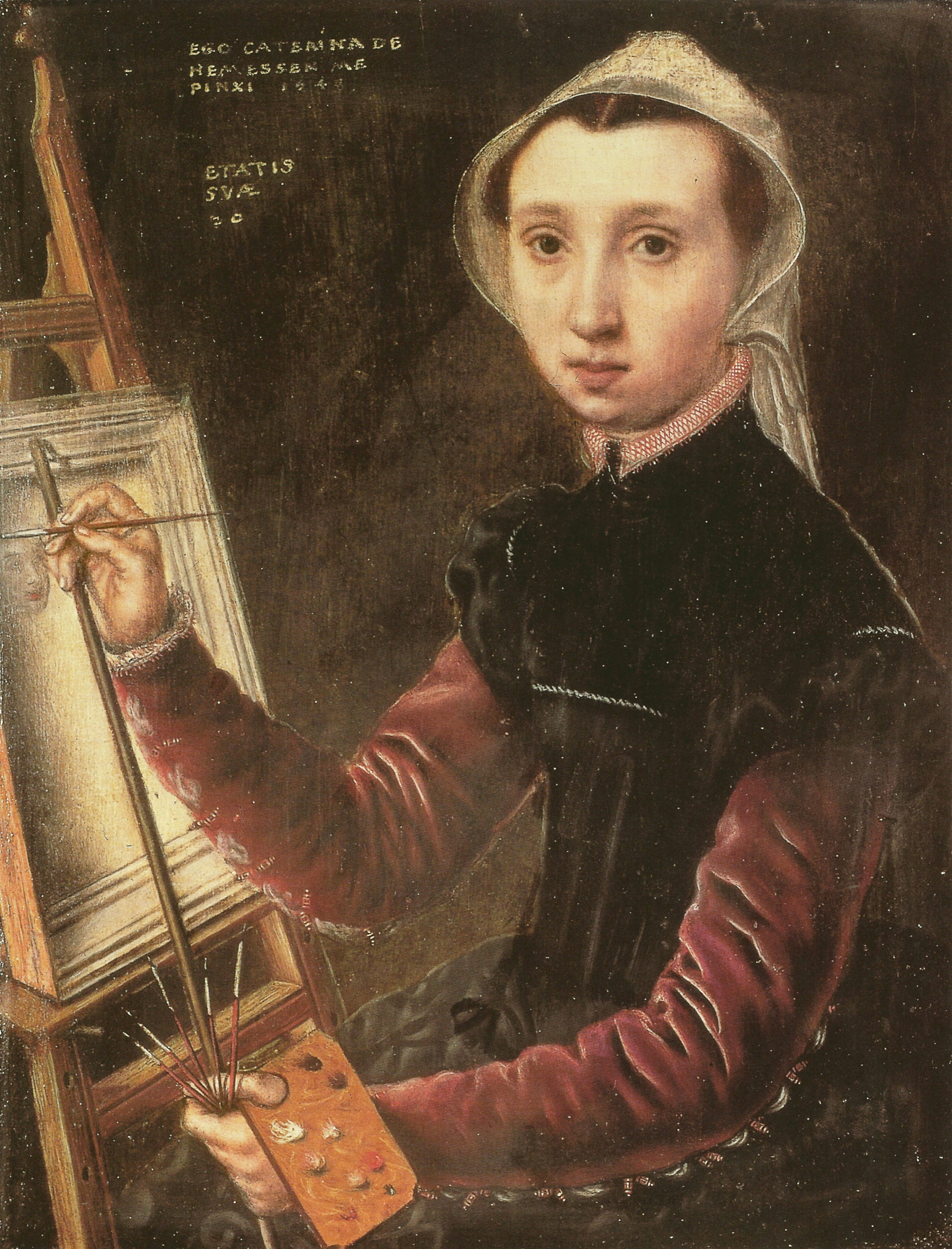
Caterina van Hemessen, Self-portrait 1548

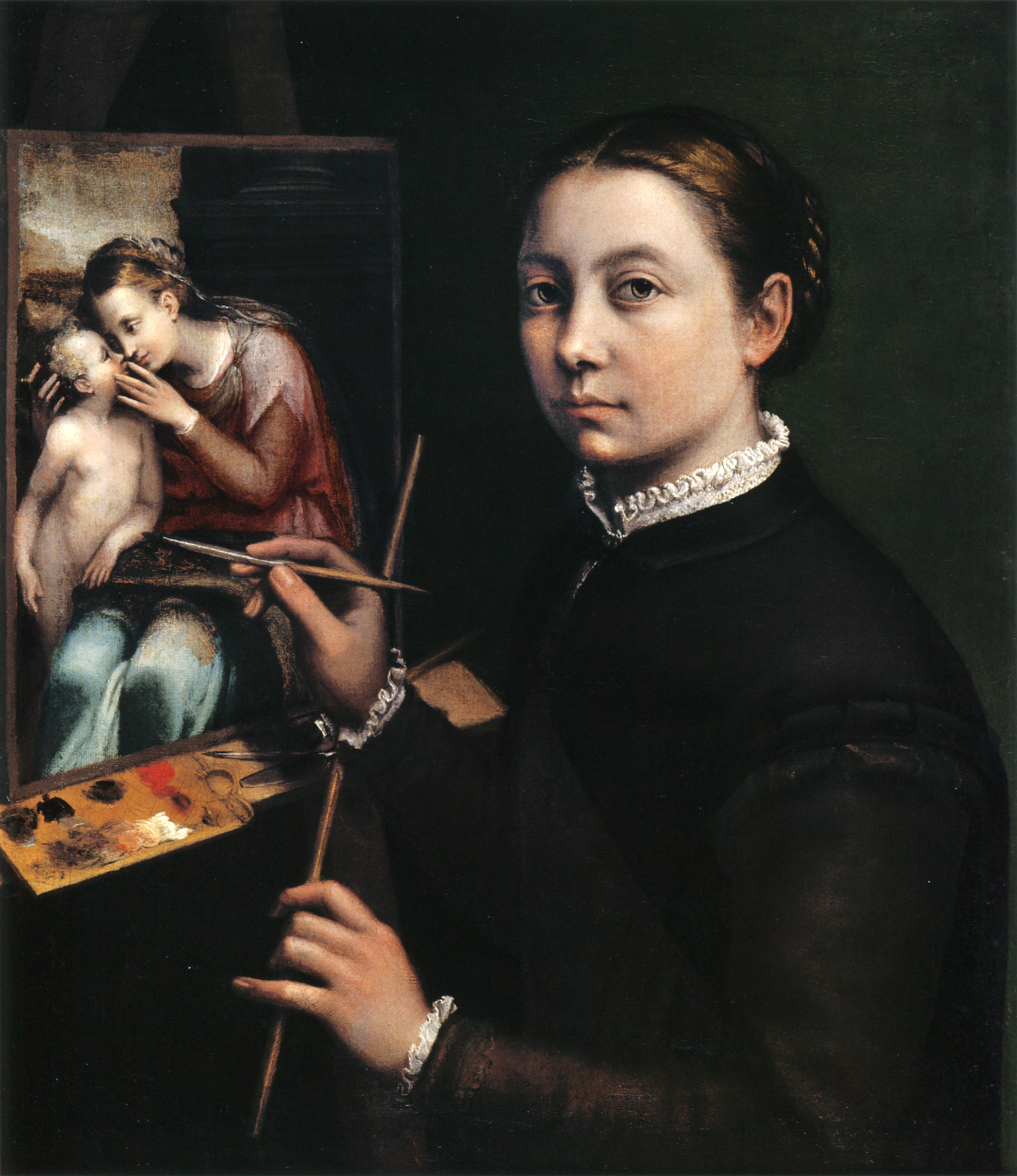
Sofonisba Anguissola, Self-Portrait, 1554

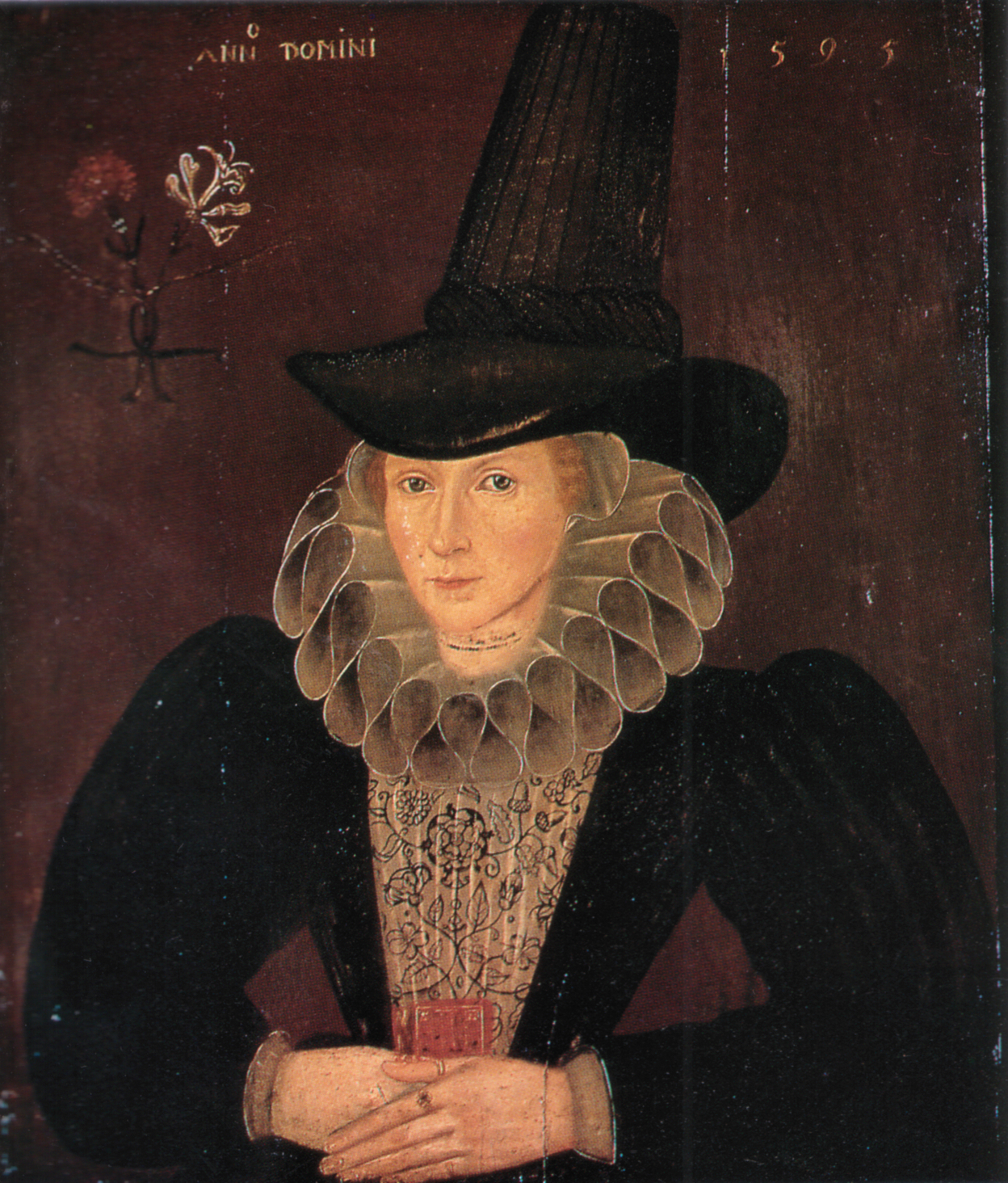
Esther Inglis, Portrait, 1595

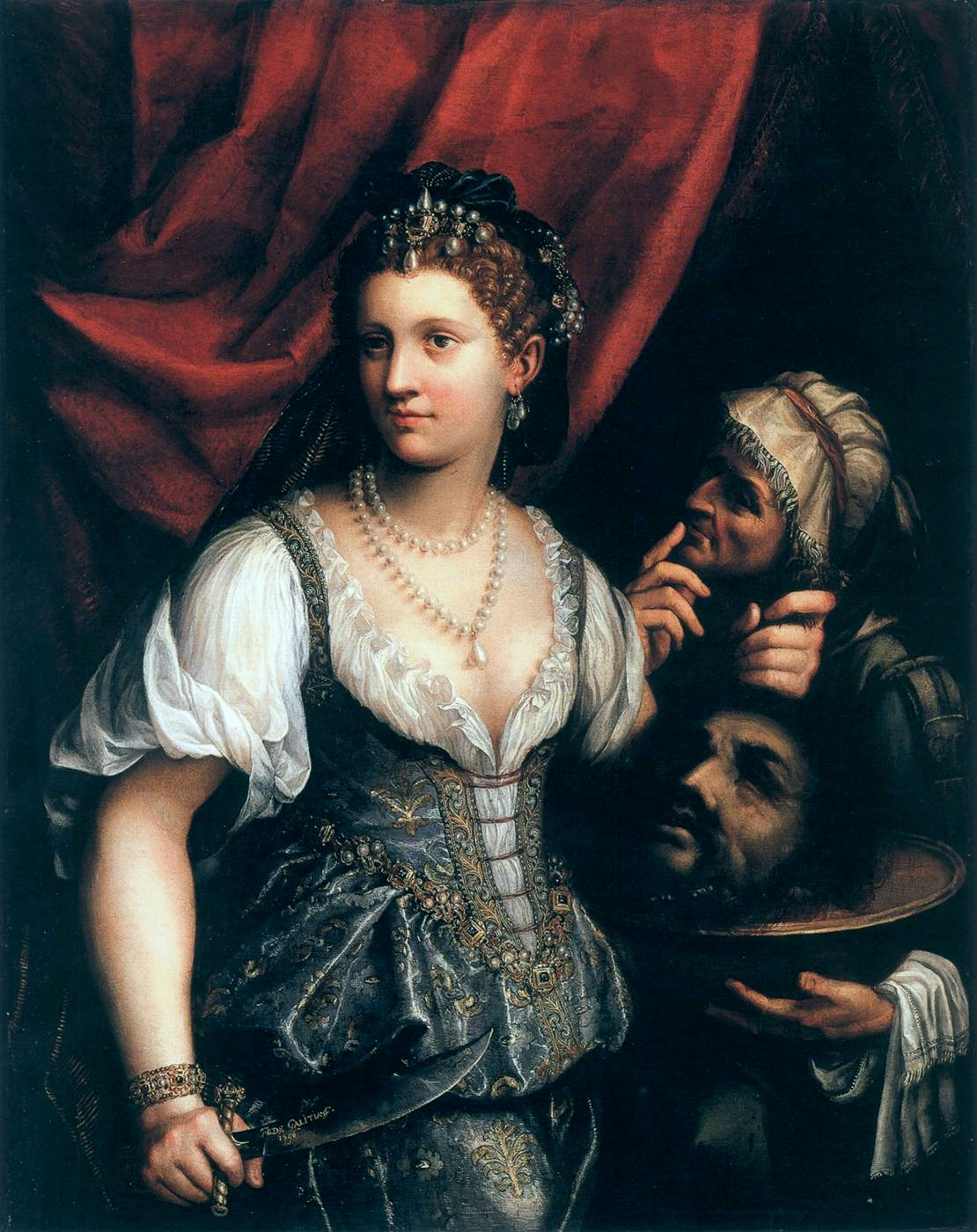
Fede Galizia, Judith with the Head of Holofernes, 1596. The figure of Judith is believed to be a self-portrait.

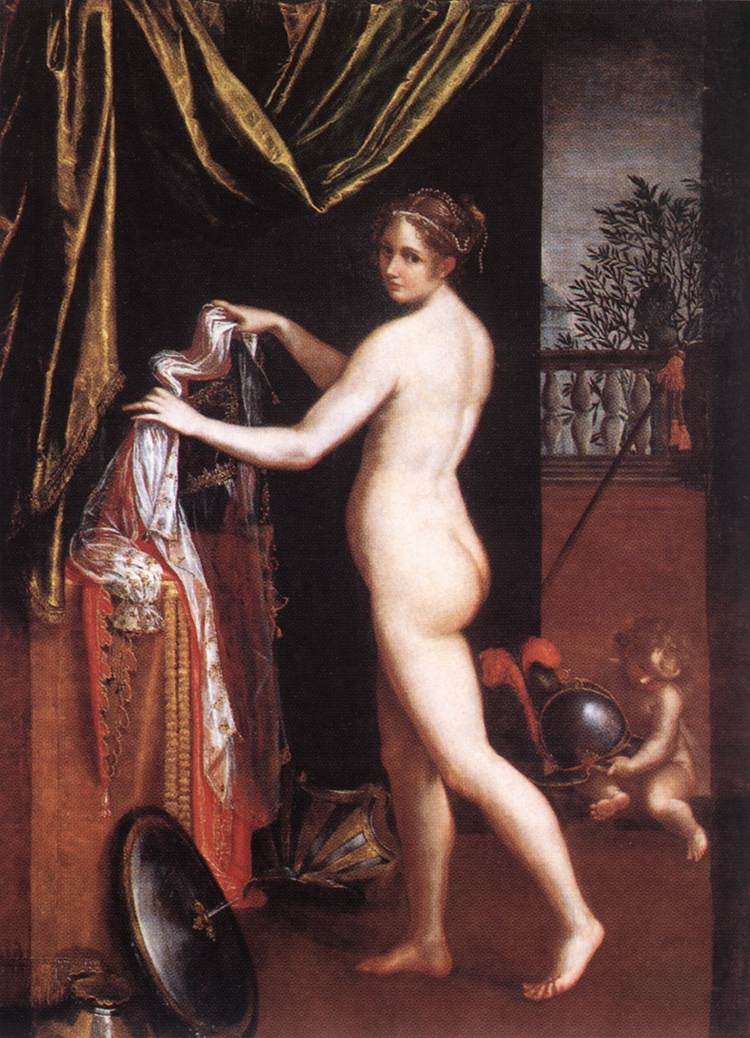
Lavinia Fontana, Minerva Dressing, 1613, Galleria Borghese, Rome

Artists from the Renaissance era include Sofonisba Anguissola, Lucia Anguissola, Lavinia Fontana, Fede Galizia, Diana Scultori Ghisi, Caterina van Hemessen, Esther Inglis, Barbara Longhi, Maria Ormani, Marietta Robusti (daughter of Tintoretto), Properzia de' Rossi, Levina Teerlinc, Mayken Verhulst, and St. Catherine of Bologna (Caterina dei Vigri).

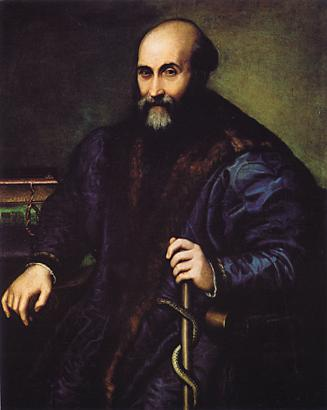
Lucia Anguissola, Doctor of Cremona, 1560, Museo del Prado, Madrid

This is the first period in Western history in which a number of secular female artists gained international reputations. The rise in women artists during this period may be attributed to major cultural shifts. One such shift came from the Counter-Reformation reacting against Protestantism and giving rise to a move toward humanism, a philosophy affirming the dignity of all people, that became central to Renaissance thinking and helped raise the status of women. In addition, the identity of the individual artist in general was regarded as more important. Significant artists from this period whose identities are unknown virtually cease to exist. Two important texts, On Famous Women and The City of Women, illustrate this cultural change. Boccaccio, a 14th-century humanist, wrote De mulieribus claris (Latin for On Famous Women) (1335–59), a collection of biographies of women. Among the 104 biographies he included was that of Thamar (or Thmyris), an ancient Greek vase painter. Curiously, among the 15th-century manuscript illuminations of On Famous Women, Thamar was depicted painting a self-portrait or perhaps painting a small image of the Virgin and Child. Christine de Pizan, a remarkable late medieval French writer, rhetorician, and critic, wrote Book of the City of Ladies in 1405, a text about an allegorical city in which independent women lived free from the slander of men. In her work she included real women artists, such as Anastasia, who was considered one of the best Parisian illuminators, although none of her work has survived. Other humanist texts led to increased education for Italian women.

The most notable of these was Il Cortegiano or The Courtier by 16th-century Italian humanist Baldassare Castiglione. This enormously popular work stated that men and women should be educated in the social arts. His influence made it acceptable for women to engage in the visual, musical, and literary arts. Thanks to Castiglione, this was the first period of renaissance history in which noblewomen were able to study painting. Sofonisba Anguissola was the most successful of these minor aristocrats who first benefited from humanist education and then went on to recognition as painters. The Cremona-born Anguissola was both a trailblazer and role model for future generations of women artists. Artists who were not noblewomen were affected by the rise in humanism as well. In addition to conventional subject matter, artists such as Lavinia Fontana and Caterina van Hemessen began to depict themselves in self-portraits, not just as painters but also as musicians and scholars, thereby highlighting their well-rounded education. Fontana benefited from the enlightened attitudes in her native city, Bologna where the university had admitted women scholars since the Middle Ages. Along with the rise in humanism, there was a shift from craftsmen to artists. Artists, unlike earlier craftsmen, were now expected to have knowledge of perspective, mathematics, ancient art, and study of the human body. In the late Renaissance the training of artists began to move from the master's workshop to the Academy, and women began a long struggle, not resolved until the late 19th century, to gain full access to this training. Study of the human body required working from male nudes and corpses. This was considered essential background for creating realistic group scenes. Women were generally barred from training from male nudes, and therefore they were precluded from creating such scenes. Such depictions of nudes were required for the large-scale religious compositions, which received the most prestigious commissions.

Although many aristocratic women had access to some training in art, though without the benefit of figure drawing from nude male models, most of those women chose marriage over a career in art. This was true, for example, of two of Sofonisba Anguissola's sisters. The women recognized as artists in this period were either nuns or children of painters. Of the few who emerged as Italian artists in the 15th century, those known today are associated with convents. These artists who were nuns include Caterina dei Virgi, Antonia Uccello, and Suor Barbara Ragnoni. During the 15th and 16th centuries, the vast majority of women who gained any modicum of success as artists were the children of painters. This is likely because they were able to gain training in their fathers' workshops. Examples of women artists who were trained by their fathers include the painter Lavinia Fontana, the miniature portraitist Levina Teerlinc, and the portrait painter Caterina van Hemessen. Italian women artists during this period, even those trained by their family, seem somewhat unusual. However, in certain parts of Europe, particularly northern France and Flanders, it was more common for children of both genders to enter into their father's profession. In fact, in the Low Countries where women had more freedom, there were a number of artists in the Renaissance who were women. For example, the records of the Guild of Saint Luke in Bruges show not only that they admit women as practicing members, but also that by the 1480s twenty-five percent of its members were women (many probably working as manuscript illuminators).

=== Nelli's Last Supper ===
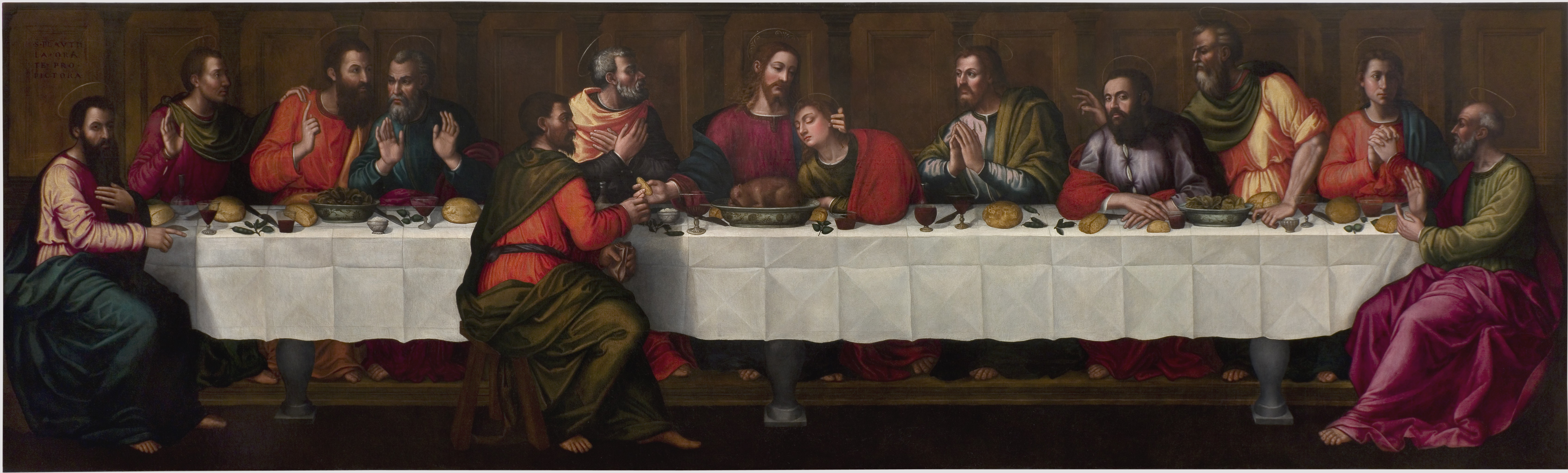
The Last Supper, a 7x2-meter oil-on-canvas, preserved in the Basilica of Santa Maria Novella, is the only signed work by Plautilla Nelli known to survive.

In the 2010s, a fragile 22-foot canvas roll in Florence came to the attention of philanthropist Jane Fortune and Florence-based author Linda Falcone and their organisation, Advancing Women Artists Foundation. Four years of restoration by a female led team, reveals the work of the 16th-century, self-taught, Sister Plautilla Nelli and the only Renaissance woman known to have painted the Last Supper. The work went on exhibition at the Santa Maria Novella Museum in Florence in October 2019. As of early 2020, AWA has sponsored the restoration of 67 works by female artists, unearthed in Florentine collections.

=== Baroque era ===
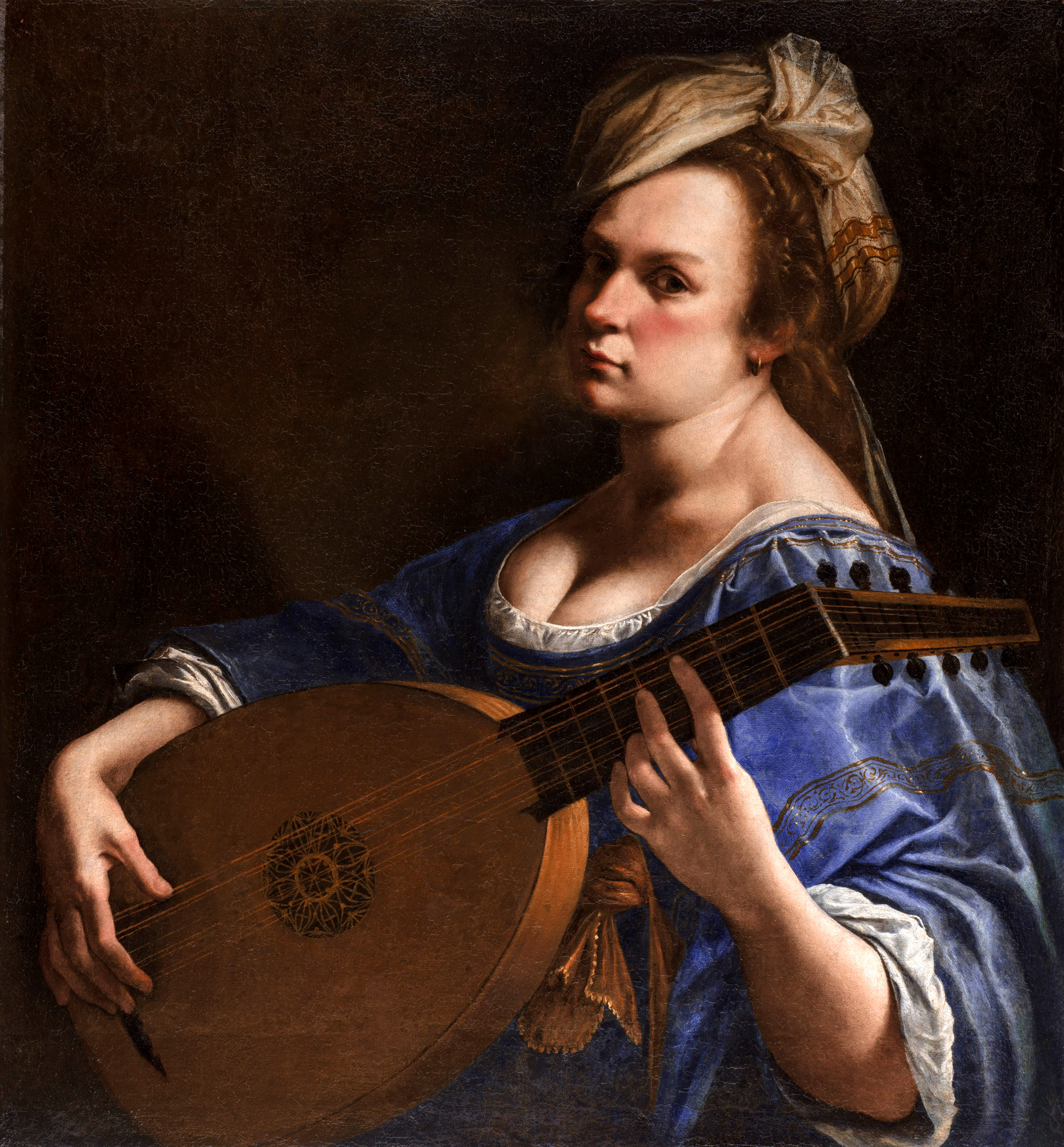
Artemisia Gentileschi, Self-Portrait as a Lute Player, c. 1615–1617, Curtis Galleries, Minneapolis

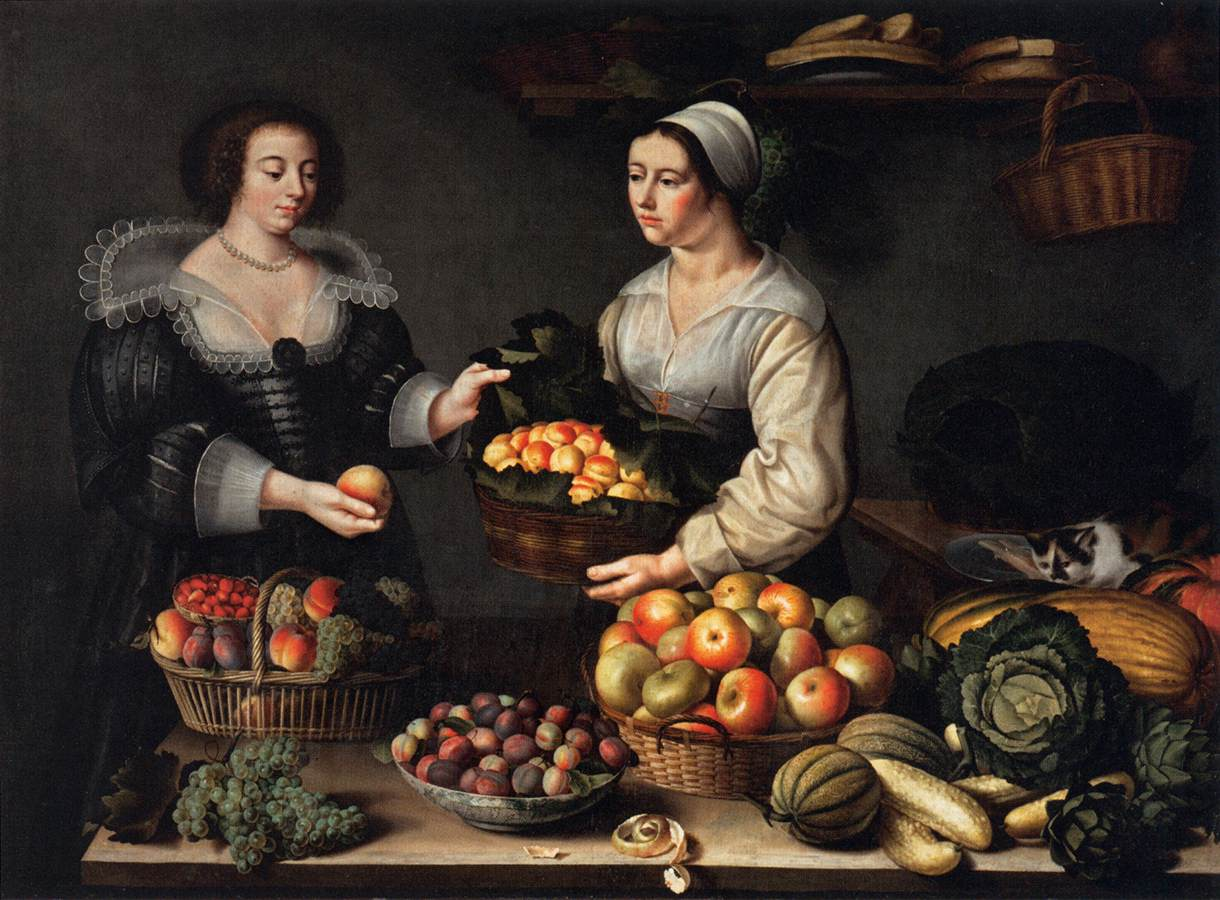
Louise Moillon, The Fruit Seller, 1631, Louvre

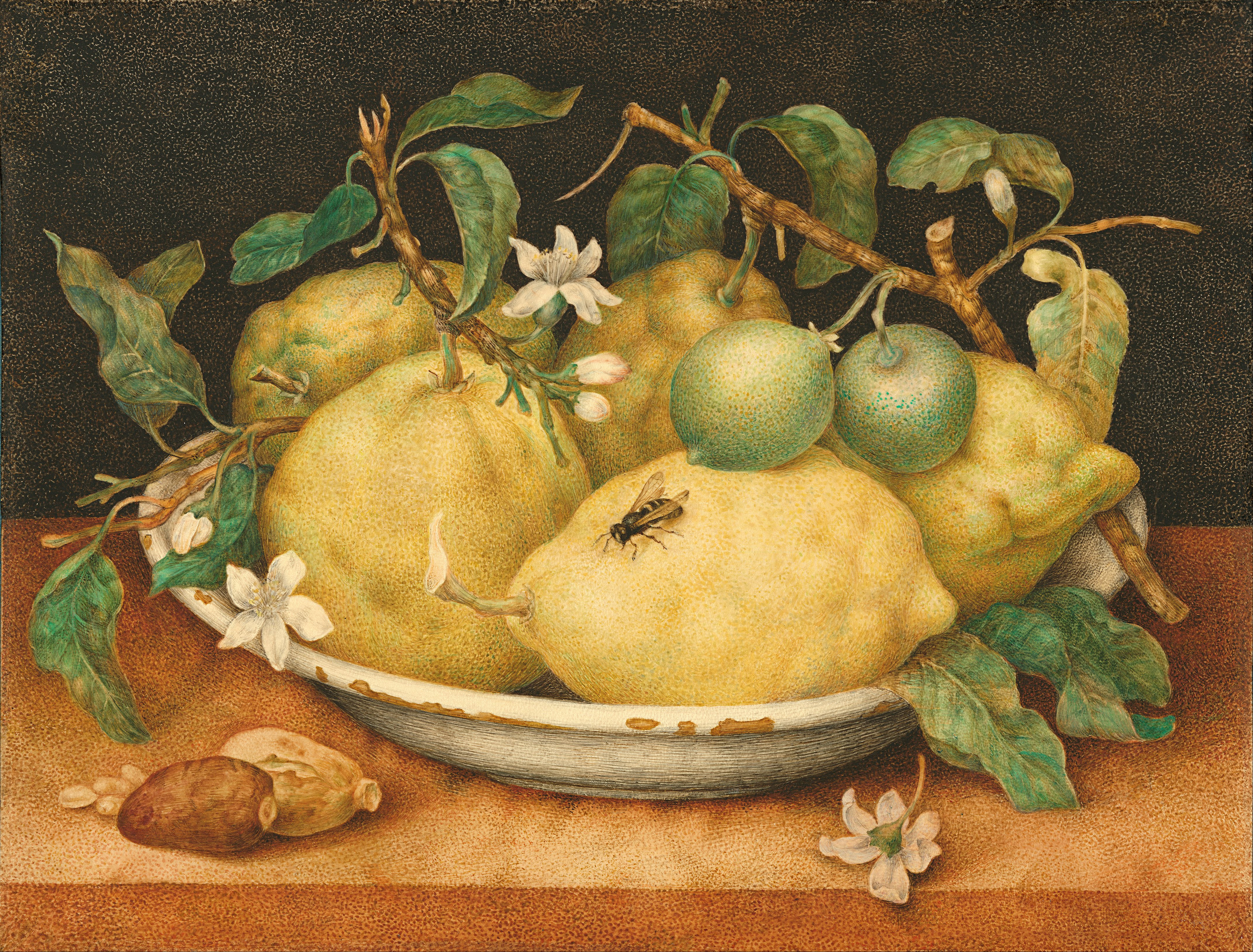
Giovanna Garzoni, Still Life with Bowl of Citrons, 1640, tempera on vellum, Getty Museum, Pacific Palisades, Los Angeles, California

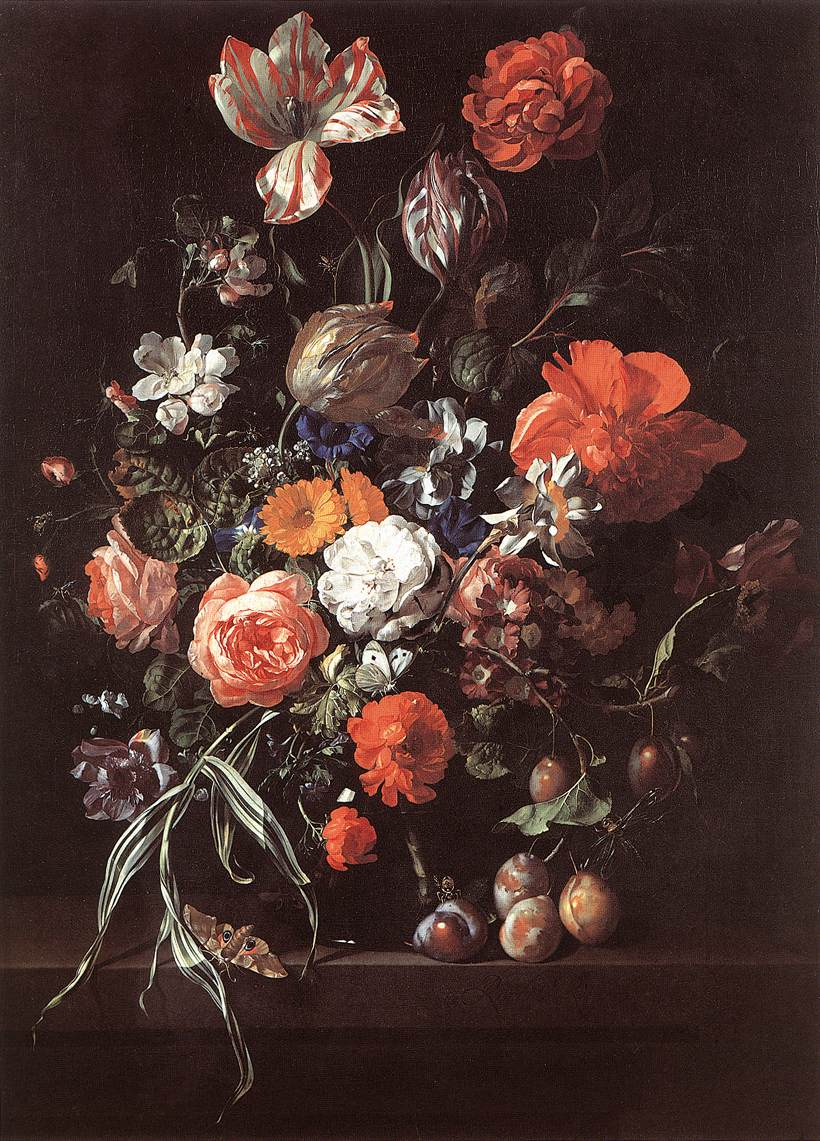
Rachel Ruysch, Still-Life with Bouquet of Flowers and Plums, oil on canvas, Royal Museums of Fine Arts of Belgium, Brussels

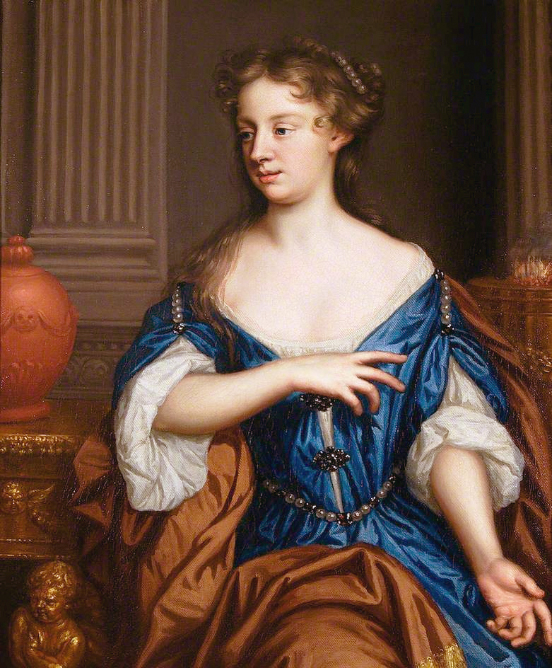
Mary Beale, Self-portrait, c. 1675–1680

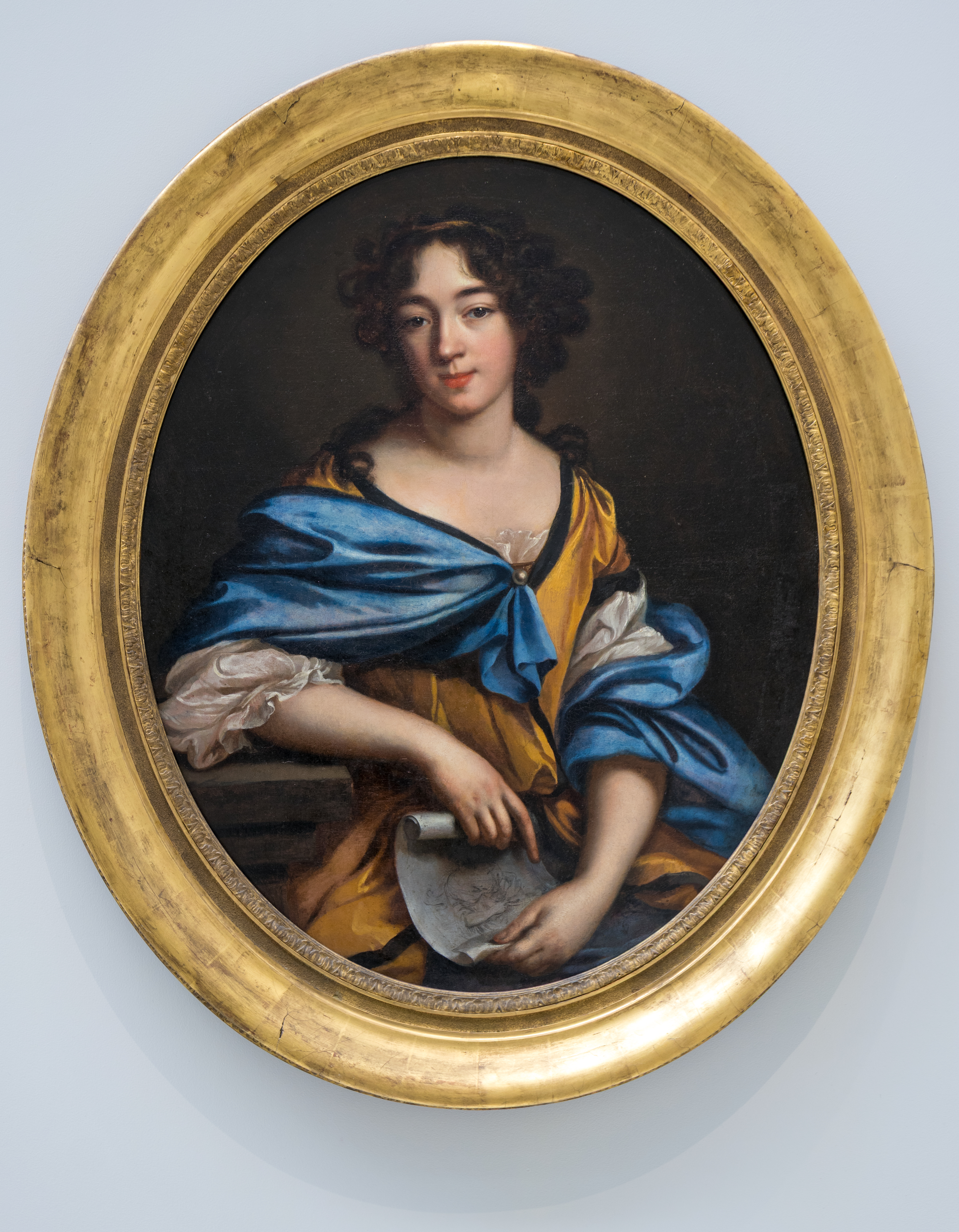
Élisabeth Sophie Chéron, self-portrait, 1672

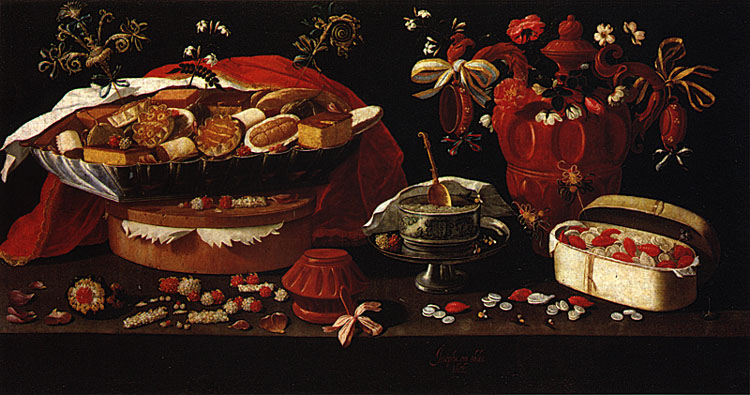
Josefa de Ayala (Josefa de Óbidos), Still-life, c. 1679, Santarém, Municipal Library

Artists from the Baroque era include: Mary Beale, Élisabeth Sophie Chéron, Maria Theresa van Thielen, Katharina Pepijn, Catharina Peeters, Johanna Vergouwen, Michaelina Wautier, Isabel de Cisneros, Giovanna Garzoni Artemisia Gentileschi, Judith Leyster, Maria Sibylla Merian, Louise Moillon, Josefa de Ayala better known as Josefa de Óbidos, Maria van Oosterwijk, Magdalena de Passe, Clara Peeters, Maria Virginia Borghese (daughter of art collector Olimpia Aldobrandini), Luisa Roldán known as La Roldana, Rachel Ruysch, Maria Theresa van Thielen, Anna Maria van Thielen, Françoise-Catherina van Thielen and Elisabetta Sirani. As in the Renaissance Period, many women among the Baroque artists came from artist families. Artemisia Gentileschi is an example of this. She was trained by her father, Orazio Gentileschi, and she worked alongside him on many of his commissions. Luisa Roldán was trained in her father's (Pedro Roldán) sculpture workshop.

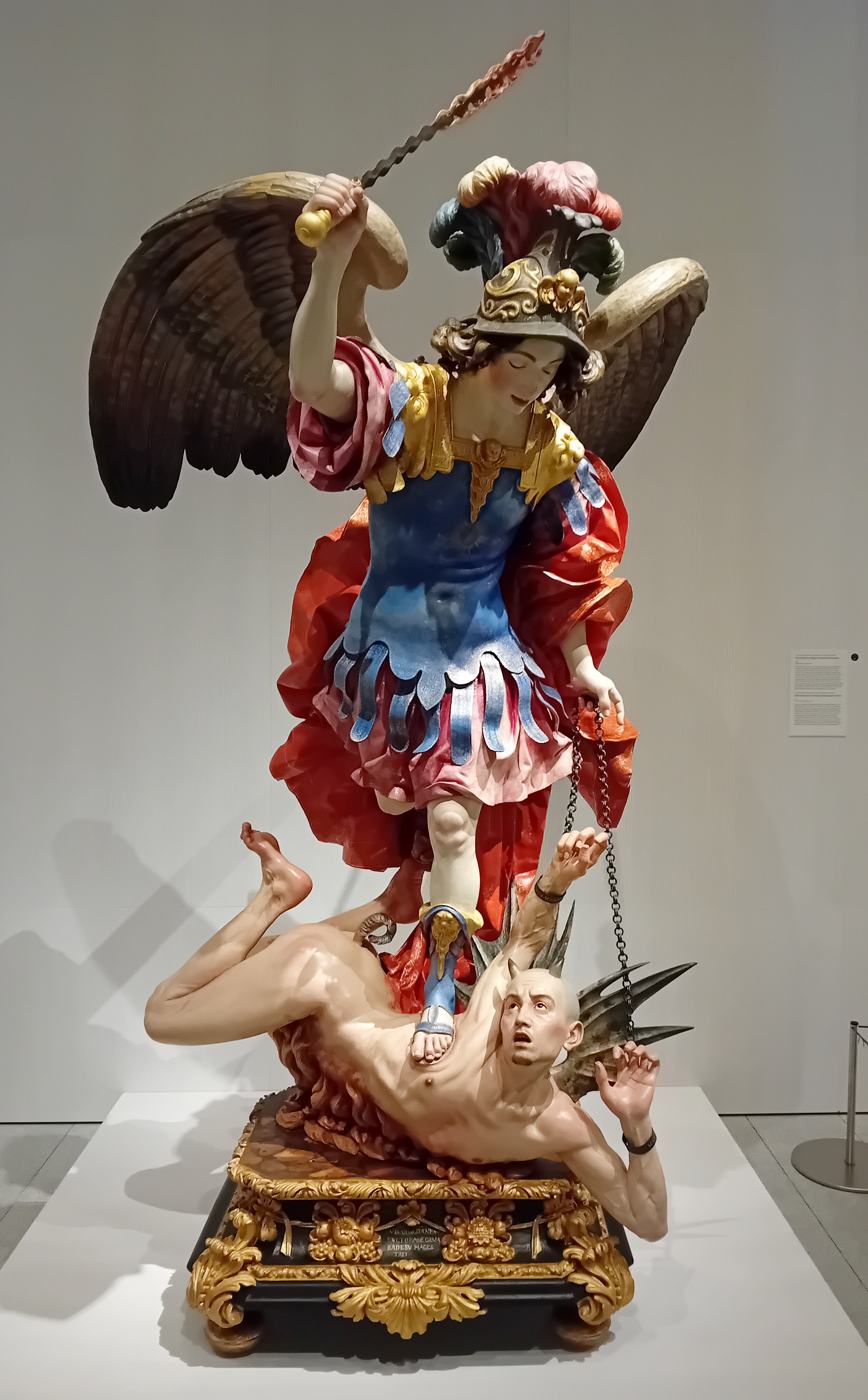
Luisa Roldán, St. Michael Overwhelming the Demon, 1692, Royal Collections Gallery, Madrid

Women artists in this period began to change the way women were depicted in art. Many of the women working as artists in the Baroque era were not able to train from nude models, who were always male, but they were very familiar with the female body. Women such as Elisabetta Sirani created images of women as conscious beings rather than detached muses. One of the best examples of this novel expression is in Artemisia Gentileschi's Judith beheading Holofernes, in which Judith is depicted as a strong woman determining and avenging her own destiny. Letizia Treves, curator at London's National Gallery 2020 Gentileschi show has commented: "you can't see it without thinking of Tassi raping Gentileschi." The elements of the picture are "balanced with such skill they speak of a painter who prioritised virtuosity over passion." While other artists, including Botticelli and the more traditional woman, Fede Galizia, depicted the same scene with a passive Judith, in her novel treatment, Gentileschi's Judith appears to be an able actor in the task at hand. Action is the essence of it and another painting by her of Judith leaving the scene. Still life emerged as an important genre around 1600, particularly in the Netherlands. Women were at the forefront of this painting trend. This genre was particularly suited to women, as they could access the materials for still life readily. In the North, these practitioners included Clara Peeters, a painter of banketje or breakfast pieces, and scenes of arranged luxury goods; Maria van Oosterwijk, the internationally renowned flower painter; and Rachel Ruysch, a painter of visually charged flower arrangements. In other regions, still life was less common, but there were important women artists in the genre including Giovanna Garzoni, who created realistic vegetable arrangements on parchment, and Louise Moillon, whose fruit still life paintings were noted for their brilliant colours.

==== Influencers within era ====
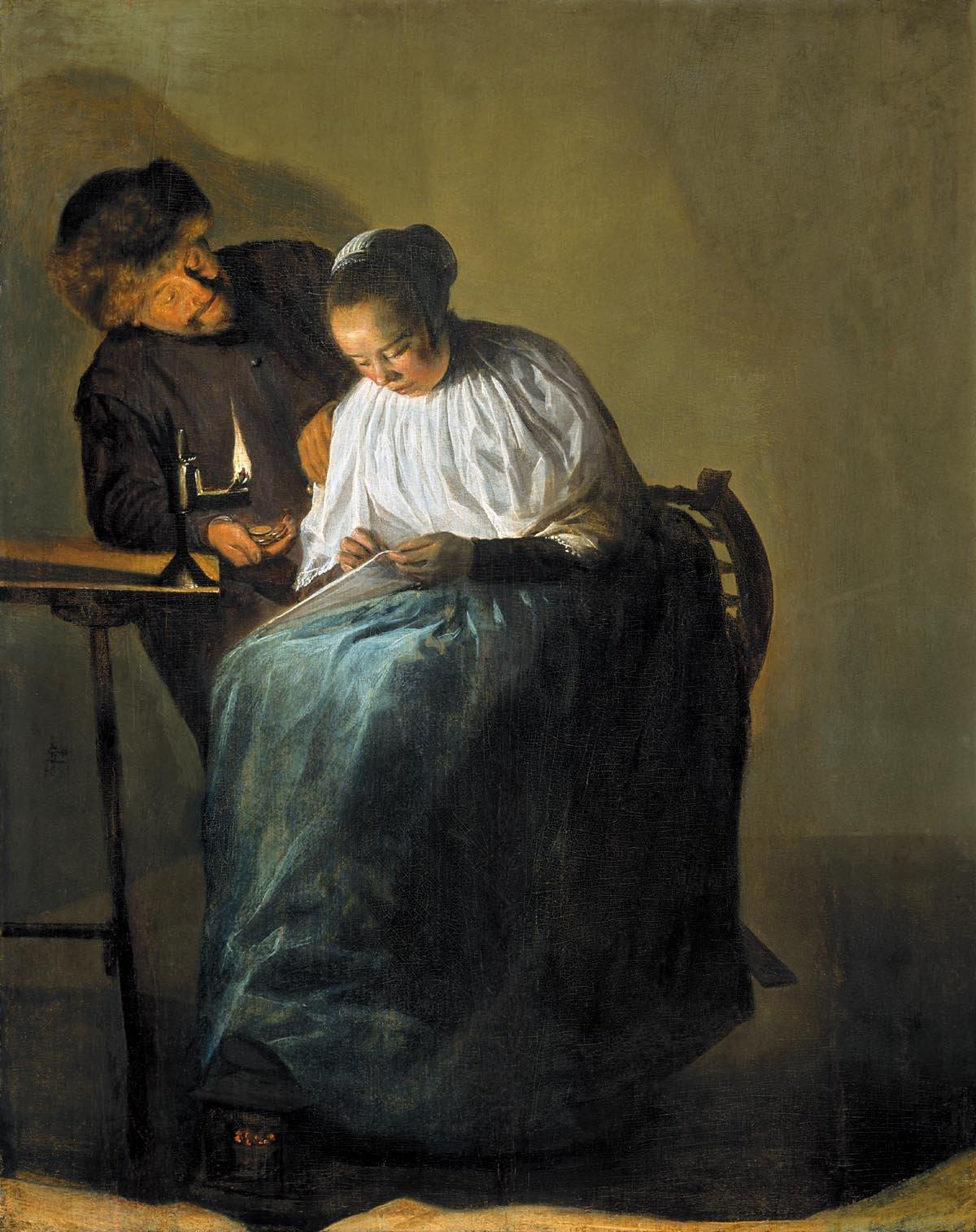
Judith Leyster, Man Offering Money to a Young Woman, 1631

Judith Leyster was the daughter of weavers and the eighth of nine children. She was not born into a traditional artistic family, but her determination to become a painter was supported by her family, and she studied painting between the ages of 11 and 16. During her teens a connection was established between the Leysters and historical painter Frans Peters de Grebber, who came into contact with her parents for the love of their embroidered designed fabrics. Leyster worked as his apprentice for years before opening her own studio. She eventually became the first woman to join the Harleem Guild. Her work showed vigorous and exuberant techniques not seen in many female artists at the time, and was seen as masculine, like that of Artemisia Gentileschi. After her death, Leyster's work was overlooked by many for more than two centuries before she was introduced into historical studies.

=== 18th century ===
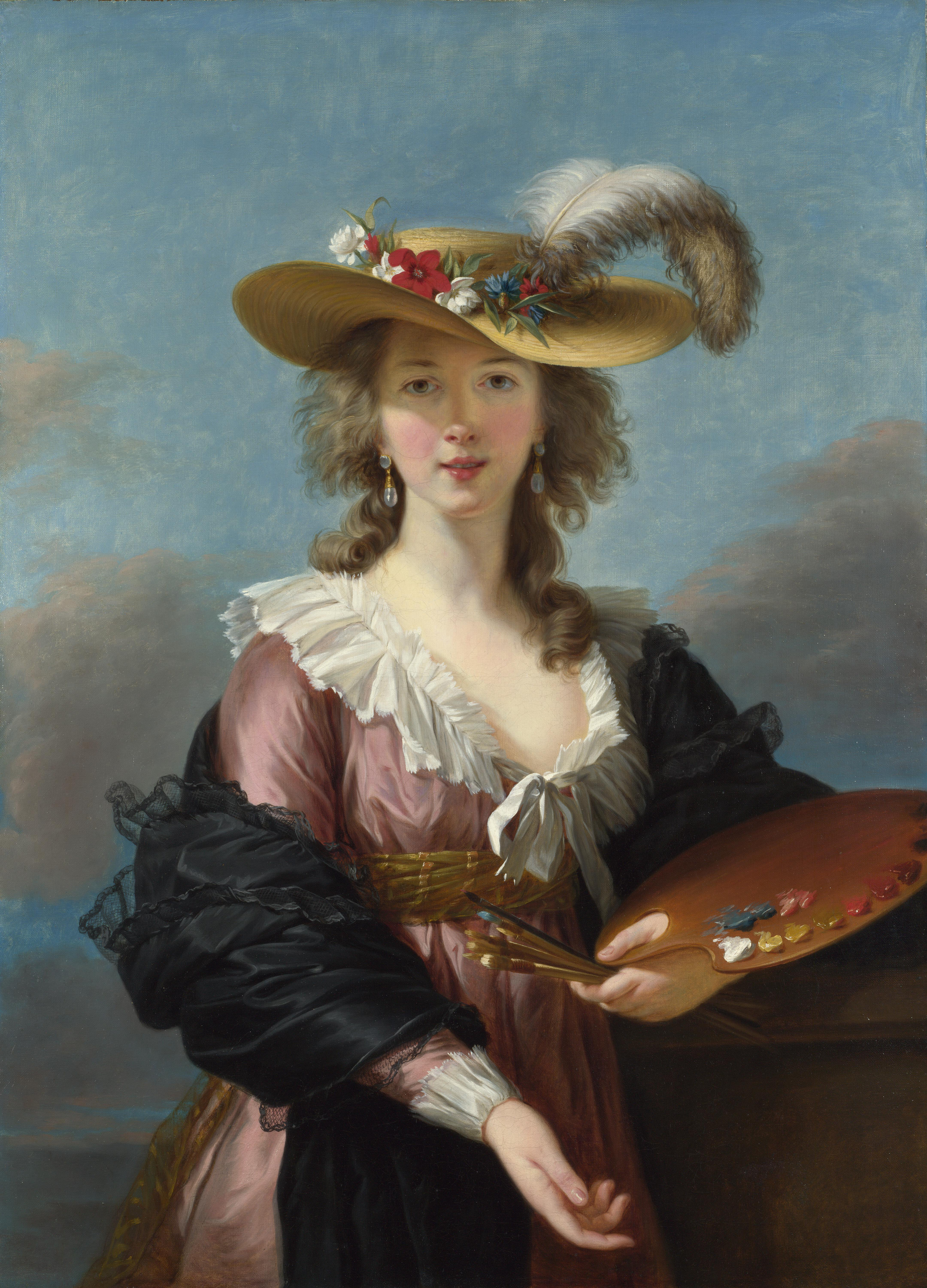
Elisabeth Vigee-Le Brun (1755–1842), Self-portrait, c. 1780s, one of many she painted for sale

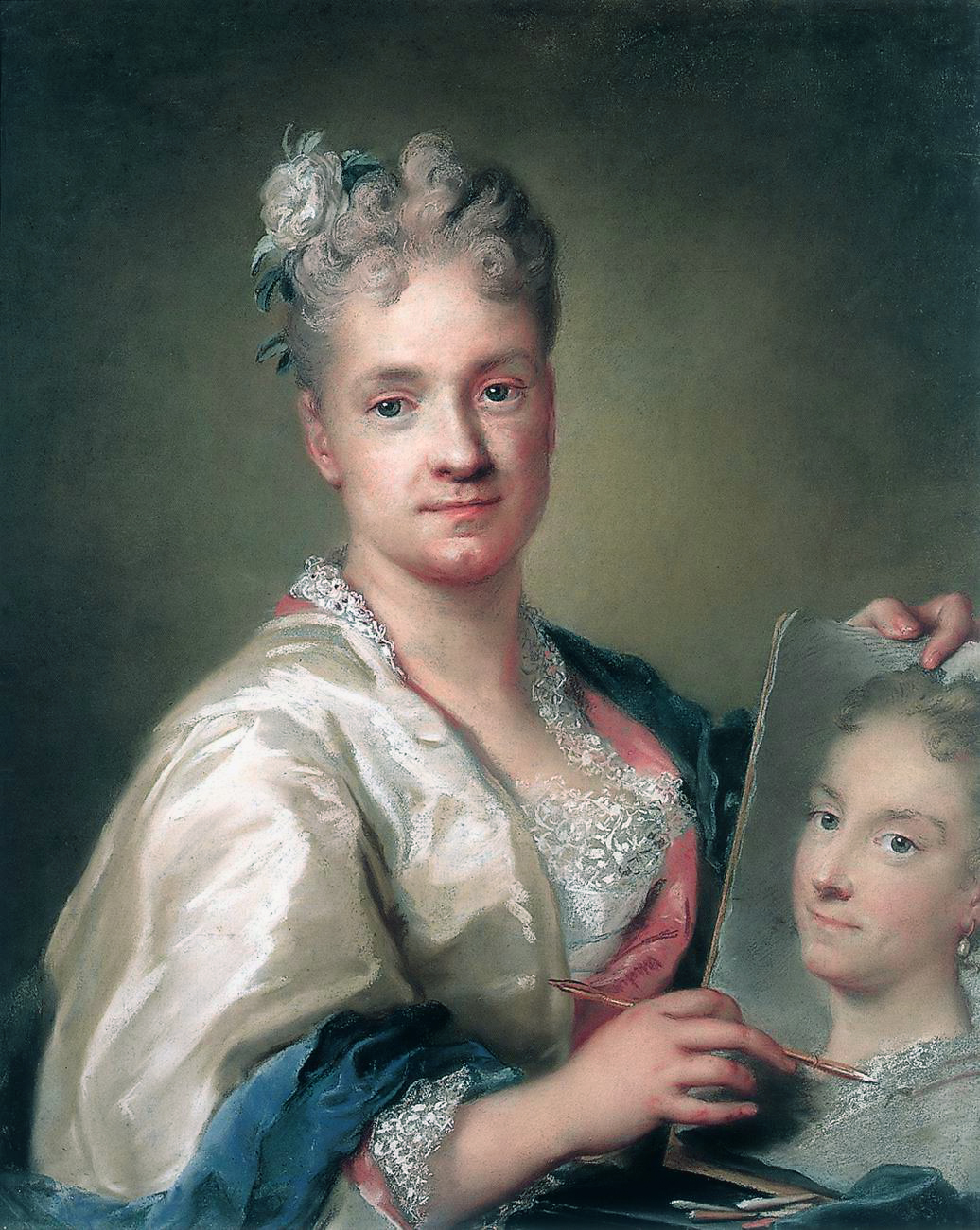
Rosalba Carriera (1675–1757), Self-portrait, 1715

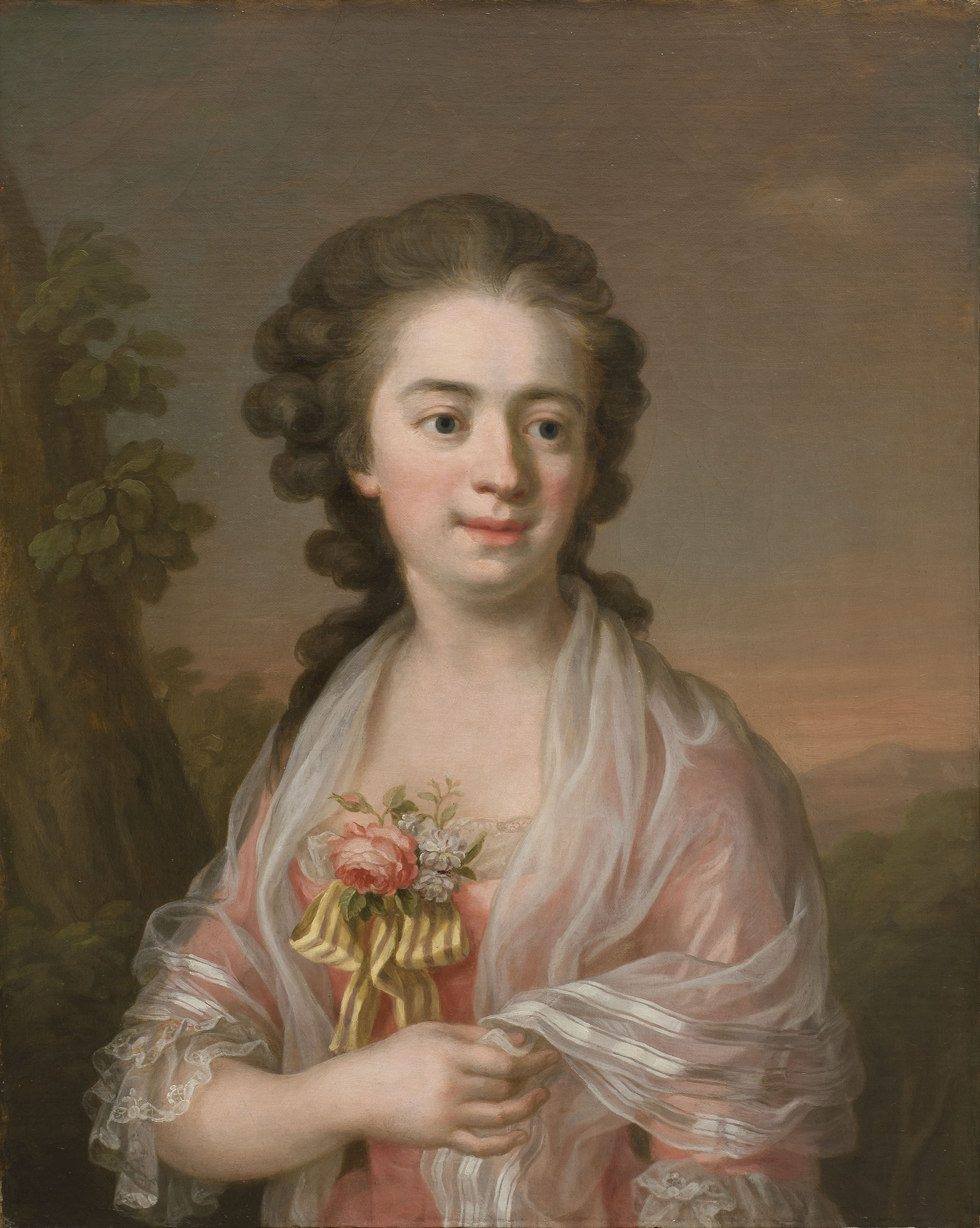
Ulrika Pasch, Self portrait, c. 1770

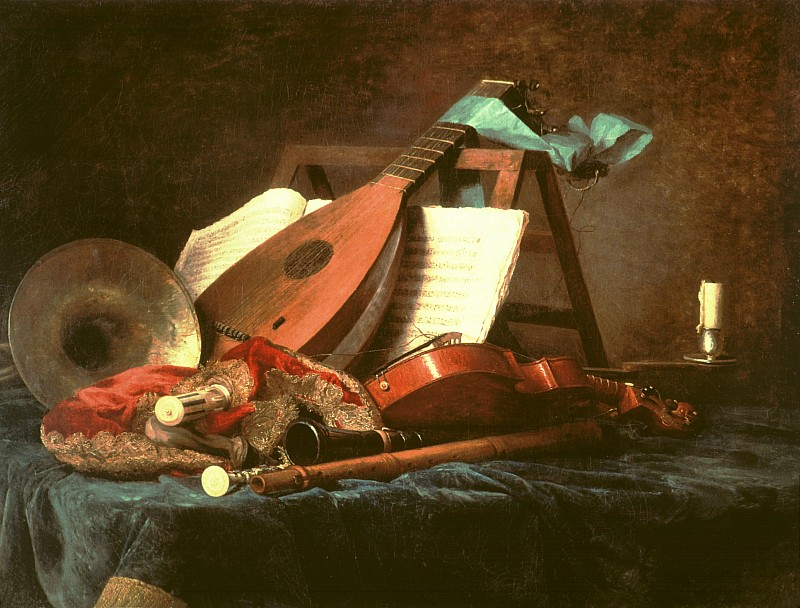
Anne Vallayer-Coster, Attributes of Music, 1770

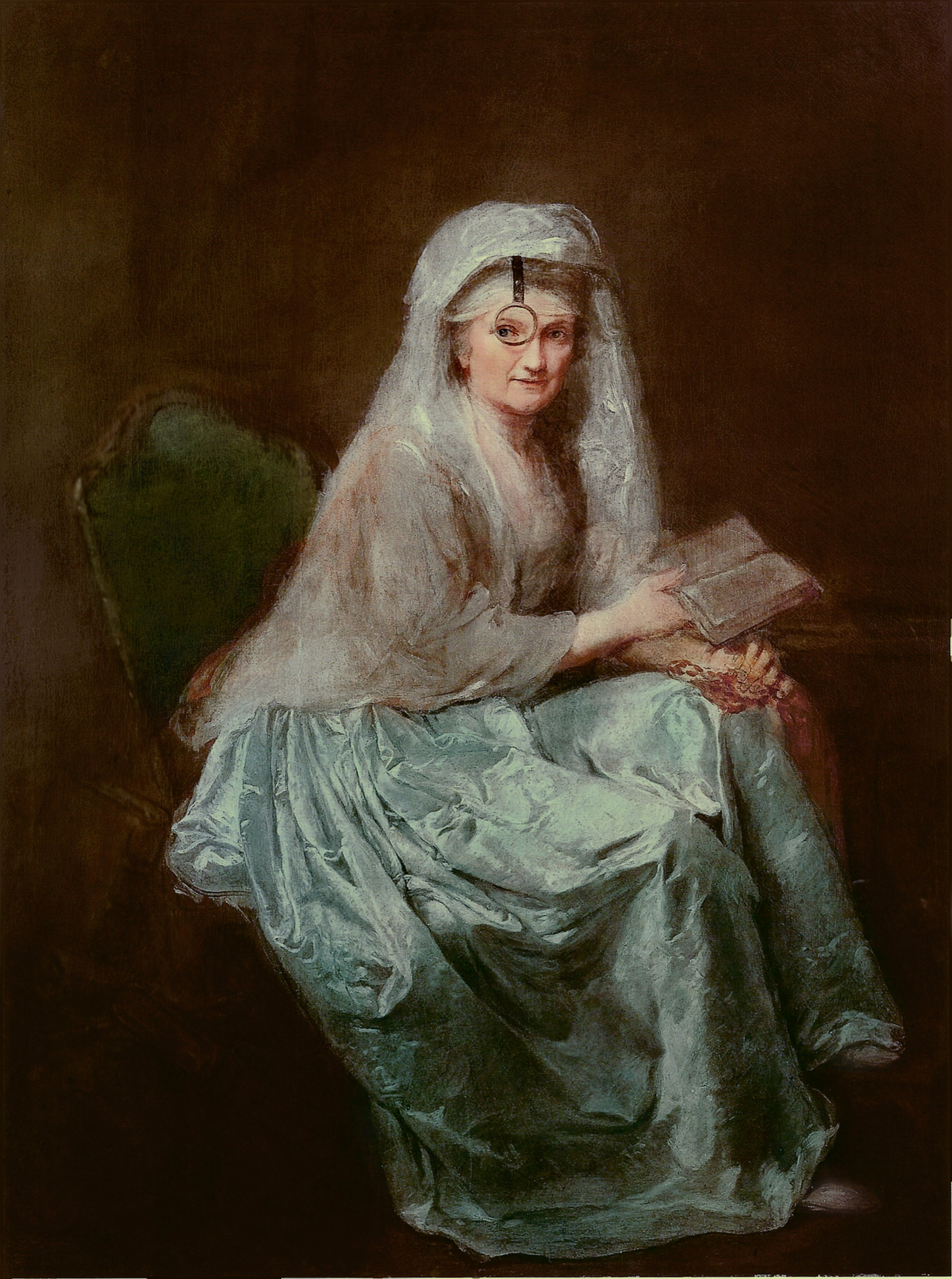
Anna Dorothea Therbusch, Self-portrait, 1777

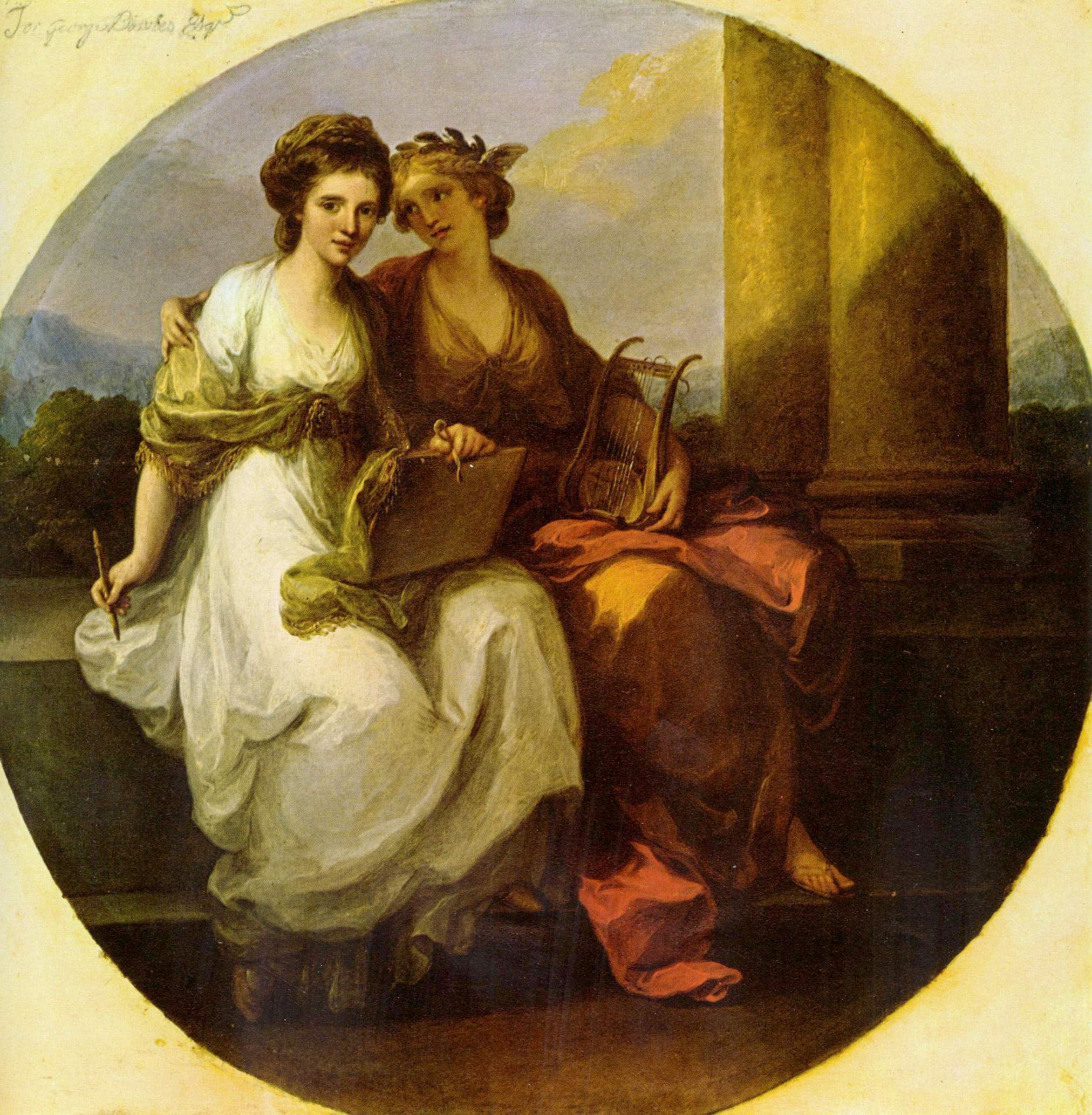
Angelica Kauffman, Literature and Painting, 1782, Kenwood House

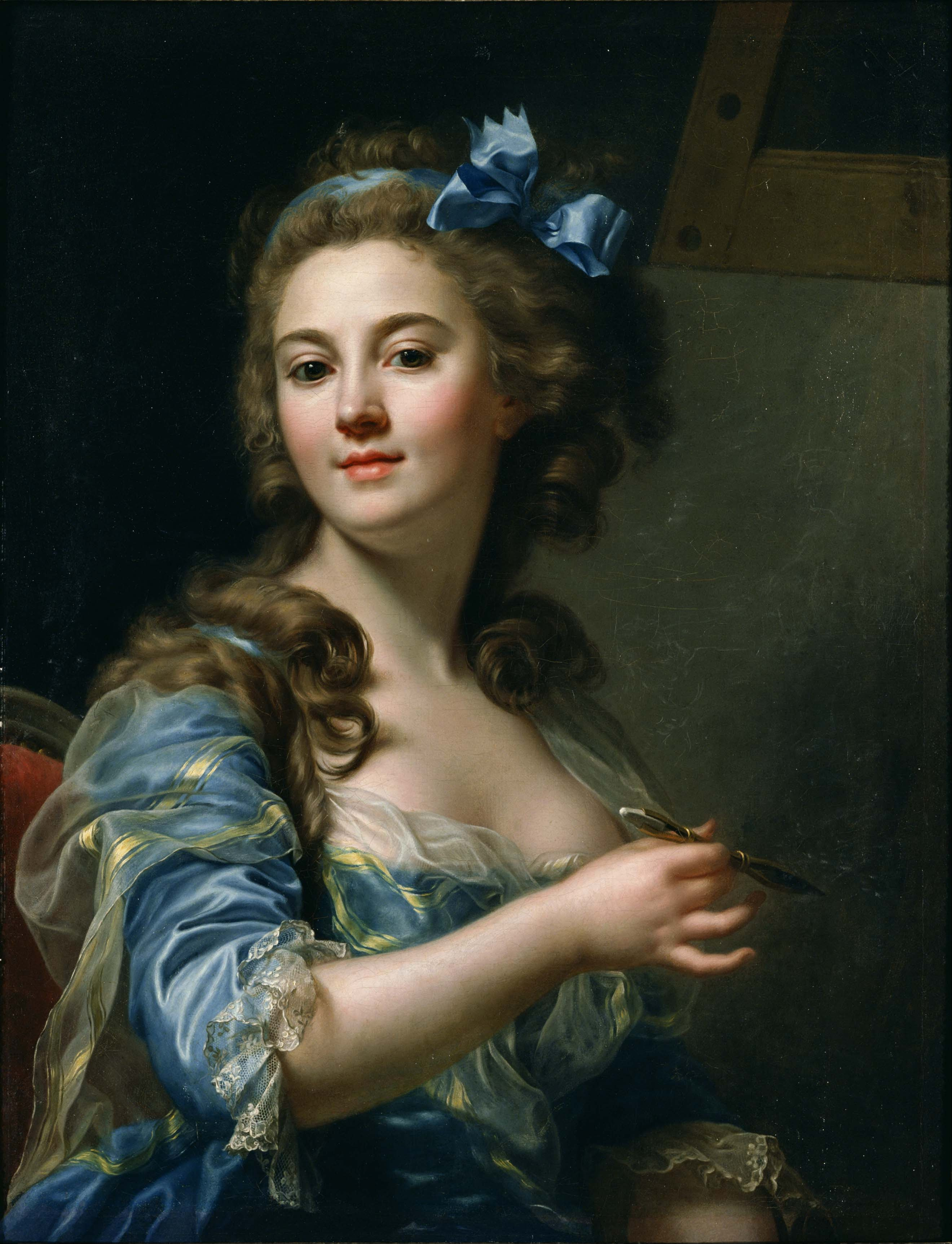
Marie-Gabrielle Capet, Self-portrait, 1783

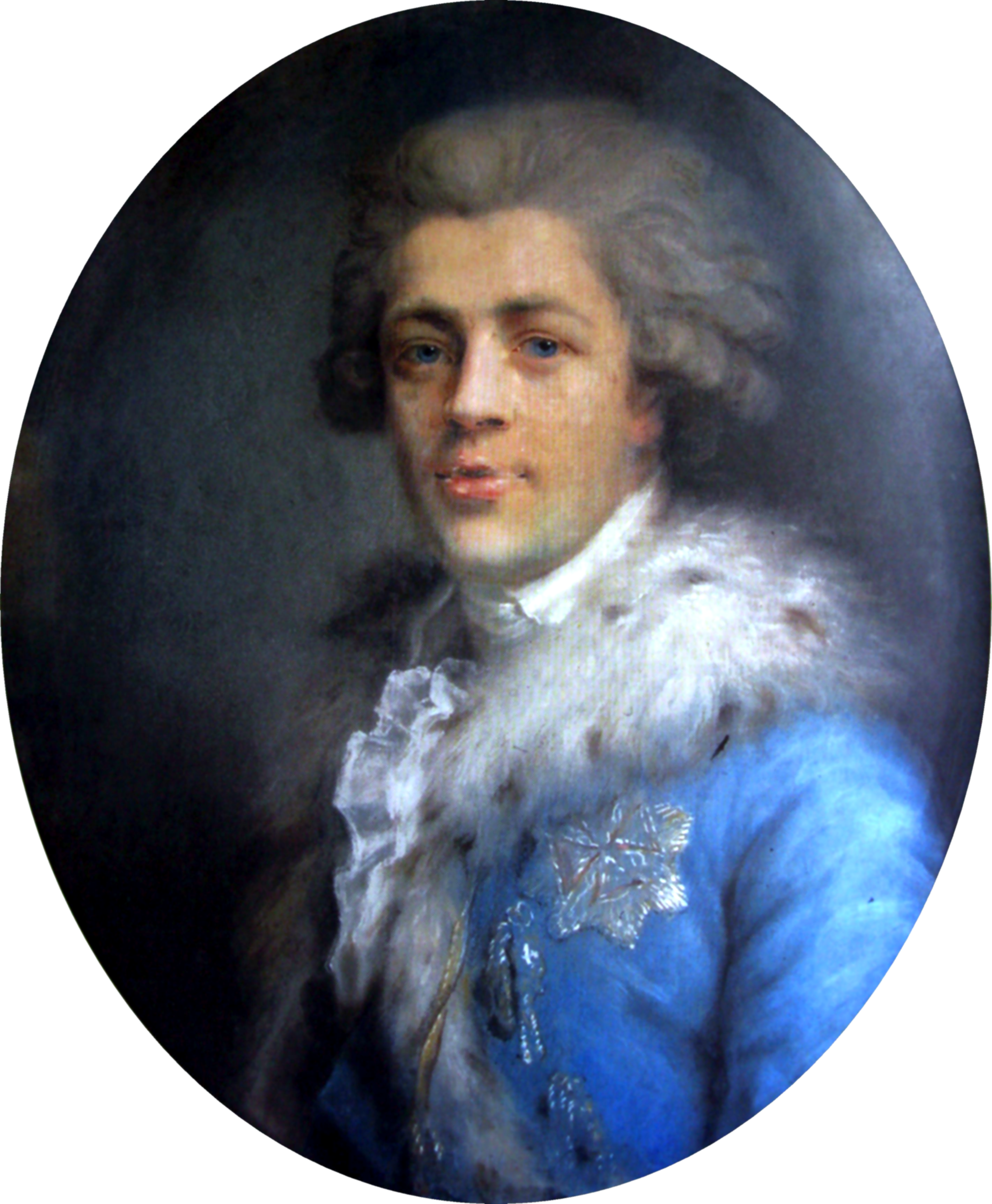
Anna Rajecka, Portrait of Ignacy Potocki, 1784

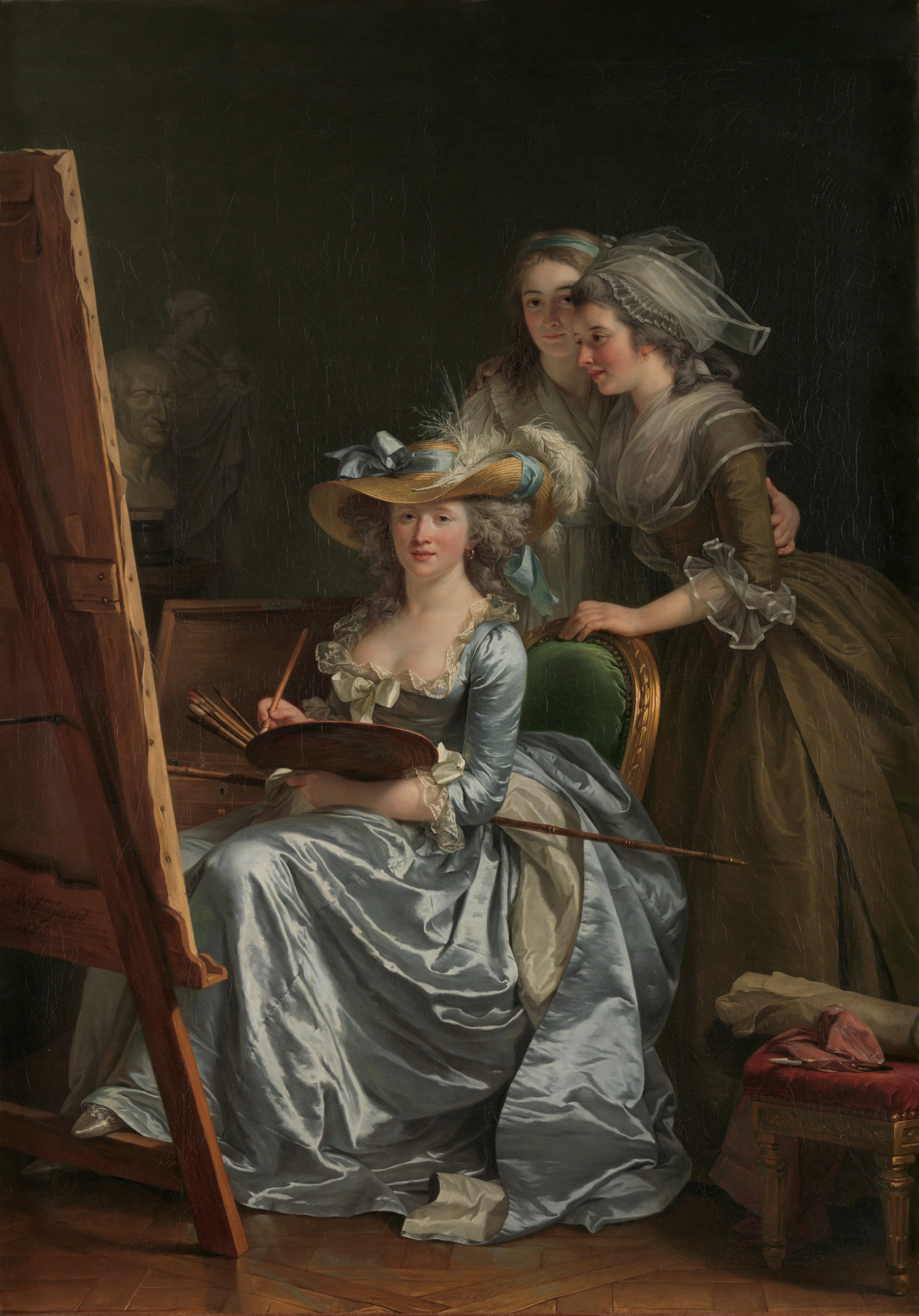
Adélaïde Labille-Guiard, Self-portrait with two pupils, Marie-Gabrielle Capet and Marie-Marguerite Carreaux de Rosemond 1785, Metropolitan Museum of Art

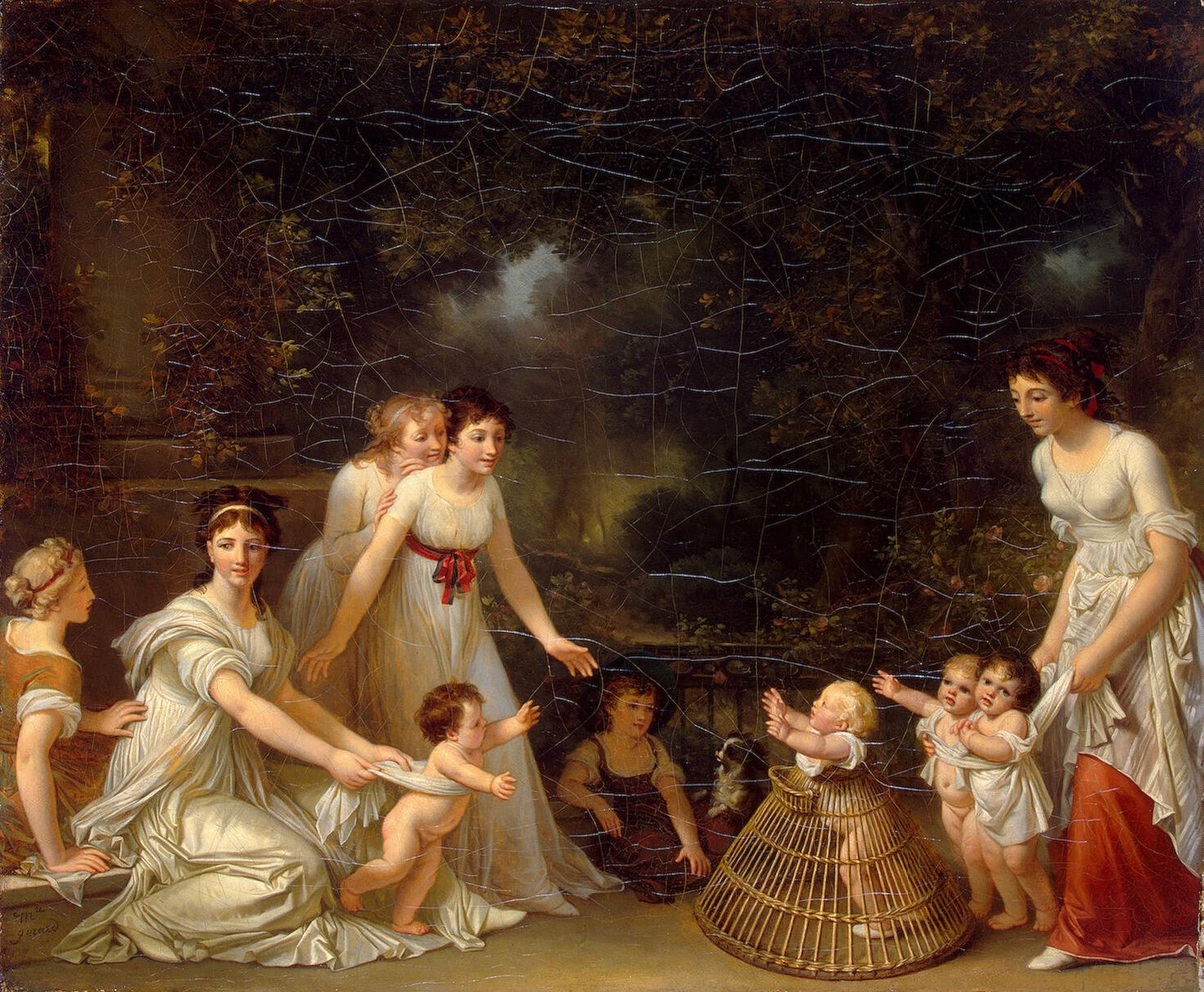
Marguerite Gérard, First steps, oil on canvas, 45.5 x 55 cm, c. 1788

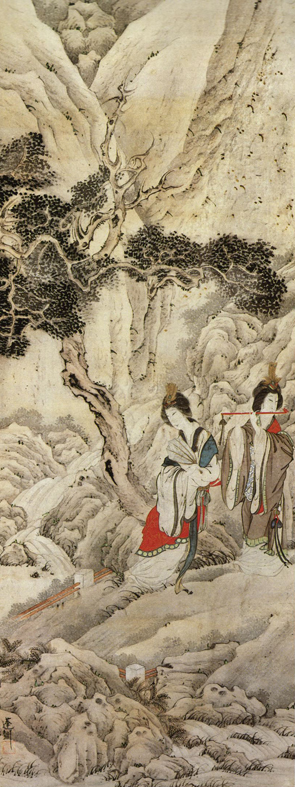
Two Ladies by Sakaki Hyakusen

Artists from this period include Rosalba Carriera, Maria Cosway, Marguerite Gérard, Angelica Kauffman, Adélaïde Labille-Guiard, Giulia Lama, Mary Moser, Ulrika Pasch, Adèle Romany, Anna Dorothea Therbusch, Anne Vallayer-Coster, Elisabeth Vigée-Le Brun, Marie-Guillemine Benoist and Anna Rajecka, also known as Madame Gault de Saint-Germain.

In many countries of Europe, the Academies were the arbiters of style. The Academies also were responsible for training artists, exhibiting artwork, and, inadvertently or not, promoting the sale of art. Most Academies were not open to women. In France, for example, the powerful Academy in Paris had 450 members between the 17th century and the French Revolution, and only fifteen were women. Of those, most were daughters or wives of members. In the late 18th century, the French Academy resolved not to admit any women at all. The pinnacle of painting during the period was history painting, especially large scale compositions with groups of figures depicting historical or mythical situations. In preparation to create such paintings, artists studied casts of antique sculptures and drew from male nudes. Women had limited, or no access to this Academic learning, and as such there are no extant large-scale history paintings by women from this period. Some women made their name in other genres such as portraiture. Elisabeth Vigee-Lebrun used her experience in portraiture to create an allegorical scene, Peace Bringing Back Plenty, which she classified as a history painting and used as her grounds for admittance into the academy. After the display of her work, it was demanded that she attend formal classes, or lose her license to paint. She became a court favourite, and a celebrity, who painted over forty self-portraits, which she was able to sell.

In England, two women, Angelica Kauffman and Mary Moser, were founding members of the Royal Academy of Arts in London in 1768. Kauffmann helped Maria Cosway enter the academy. Although Cosway went on to gain success as a painter of mythological scenes, both women remained in a somewhat ambivalent position at the Royal Academy, as evidenced by the group portrait of The Academicians of the Royal Academy by Johan Zoffany now in The Royal Collection. In it, only the men of the academy are assembled in a large artist studio, together with nude male models. For reasons of decorum given the nude models, the two women are not shown as present, but as portraits on the wall instead. The emphasis in Academic art on studies of the nude during training remained a considerable barrier for women studying art until the 20th century, both in terms of actual access to the classes and in terms of family and social attitudes to middle-class women becoming artists. After these three, no woman became a full member of the academy until Laura Knight in 1936, and women were not admitted to the academy's schools until 1861. By the late 18th century, there were important steps forward for artists who were women. In Paris, the Salon, the exhibition of work founded by the academy, became open to non-Academic painters in 1791, allowing women to showcase their work in the prestigious annual exhibition. Additionally, women were more frequently being accepted as students by famous artists such as Jacques-Louis David and Jean-Baptiste Greuze.

== 19th century ==
=== Painters ===
Women artists of the early part of the 19th century include Marie-Denise Villers, who specialized in portraiture; Constance Mayer, who painted portraits and allegories; Marie Ellenrieder, who was noted mainly for her religious paintings in the Nazarene style; Louise-Adéone Drölling, who followed in the footsteps of her father and her older brother as a painter and draughtswoman.

In the second half of the century, Emma Sandys, Marie Spartali Stillman, Eleanor Fortescue-Brickdale, and Maria Zambaco were women artists of the Pre-Raphaelite movement. Also influenced by the Pre-Raphaelites were Evelyn De Morgan and the activist and painter Barbara Bodichon.

Impressionist painters Berthe Morisot, Marie Bracquemond, and the Americans, Mary Cassatt and Lucy Bacon, became involved in the French Impressionist movement of the 1860s and 1870s. American Impressionist Lilla Cabot Perry was influenced by her studies with Monet and by Japanese art in the late 19th century. Cecilia Beaux was an American portrait painter who also studied in France. Apart from Anna Bilińska, Olga Boznańska is considered the best-known of all Polish women artists, and was stylistically associated with Impressionism.

Rosa Bonheur was the best-known female artist of her time, internationally renowned for her paintings of animals. Elizabeth Thompson (Lady Butler), perhaps inspired by her life-classes of armoured figures at the Government School, was one of the first women to become famous for large history paintings, specializing in scenes of military action, usually with many horses, most famously Scotland Forever!, showing a cavalry charge at Waterloo.

Kitty Lange Kielland was a Norwegian landscape painter.

Elizabeth Jane Gardner was an American academic painter who was the first American woman to exhibit at the Paris Salon. In 1872 she became the first woman to ever win a gold medal at the Salon.

In 1894, Suzanne Valadon was the first woman admitted to the Société Nationale des Beaux-Arts in France. Anna Boch was a Post-Impressionist painter, as was Laura Muntz Lyall, who exhibited at the 1893 World Columbian Exposition in Chicago, Illinois, and then in 1894 as part of the Société des artistes français in Paris.

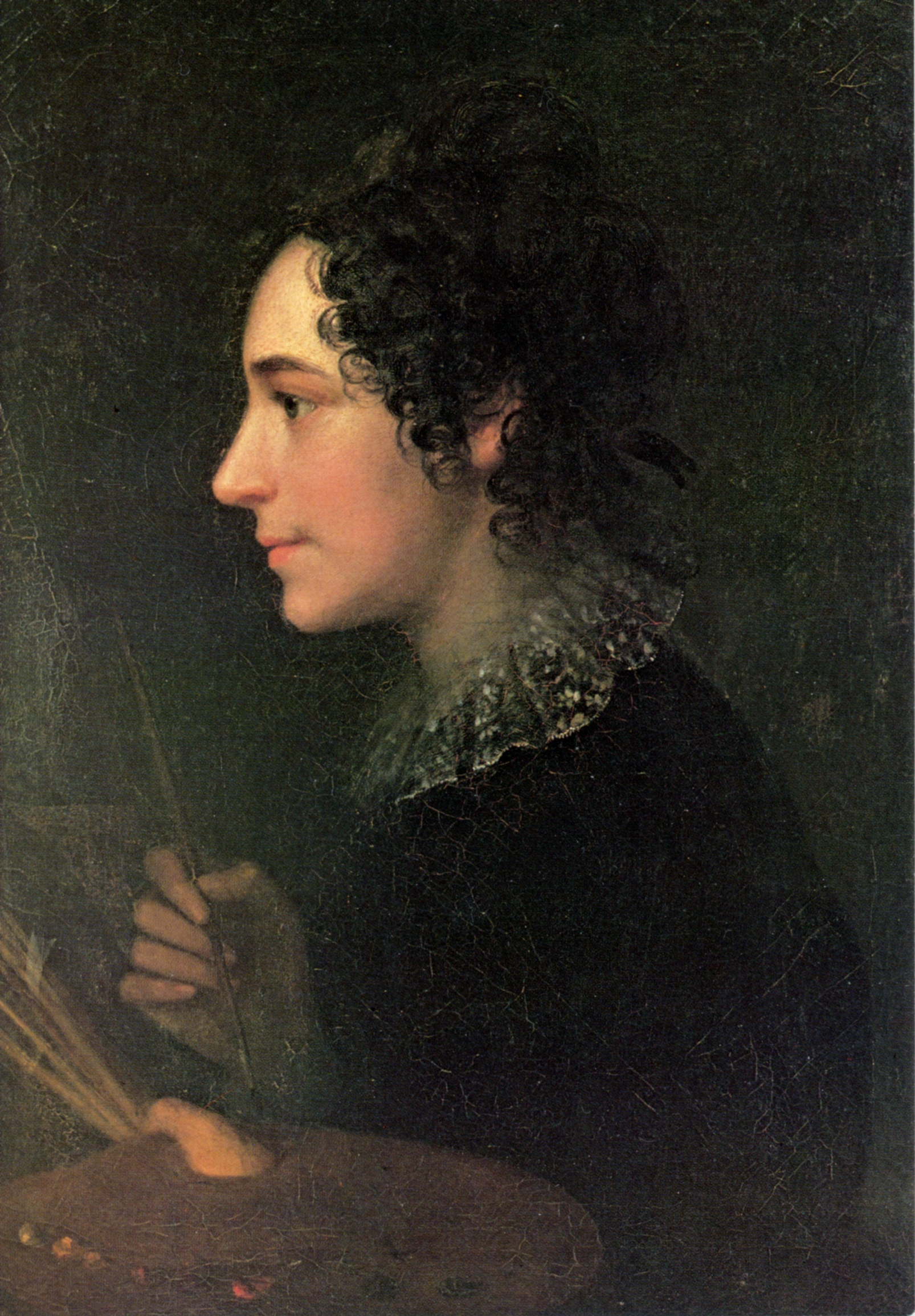
Marie Ellenrieder, Self-portrait as a Painter, 1819

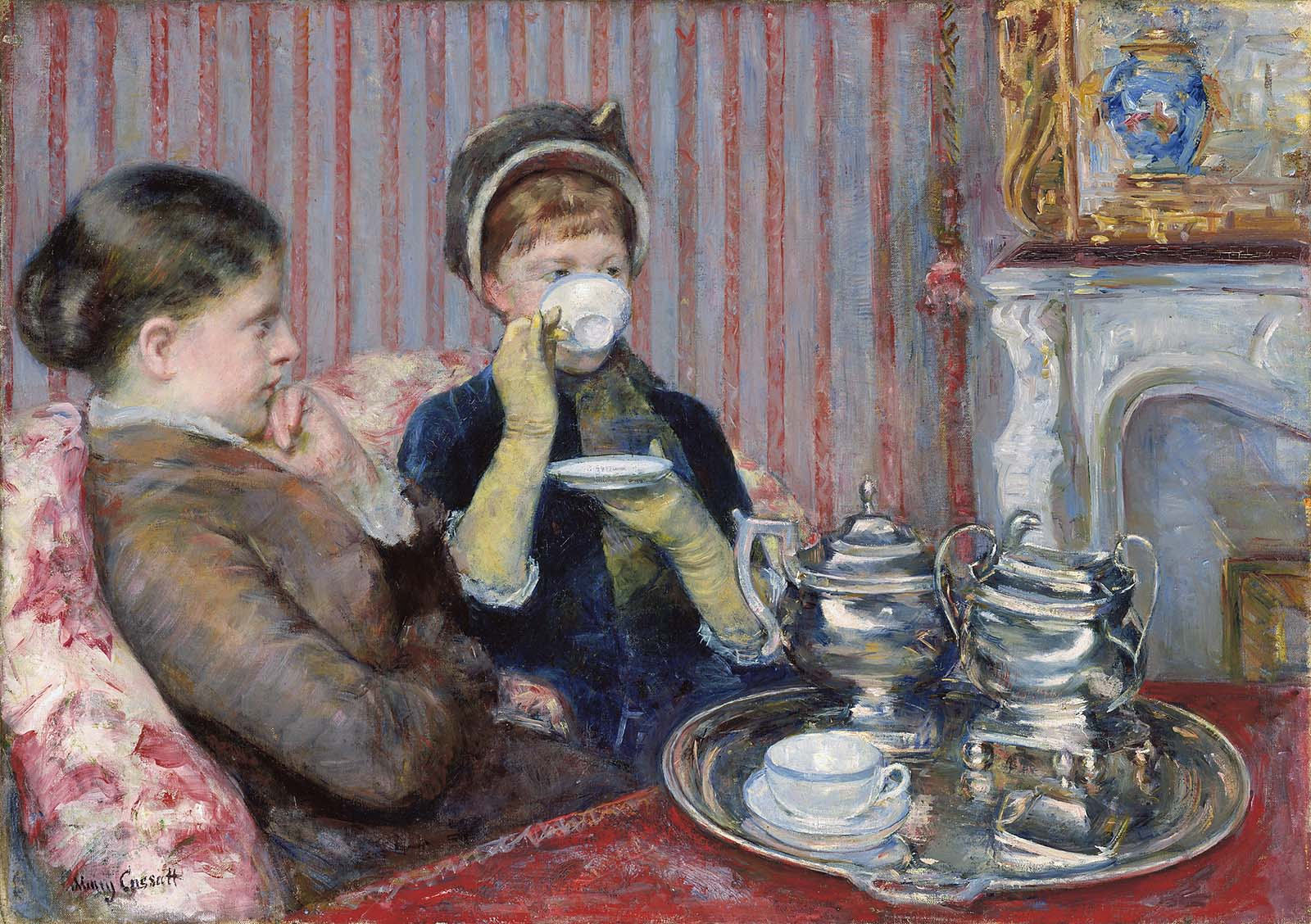
Mary Cassatt, Tea, 1880, oil on canvas, 25½ × 36¼ in., Museum of Fine Arts, Boston

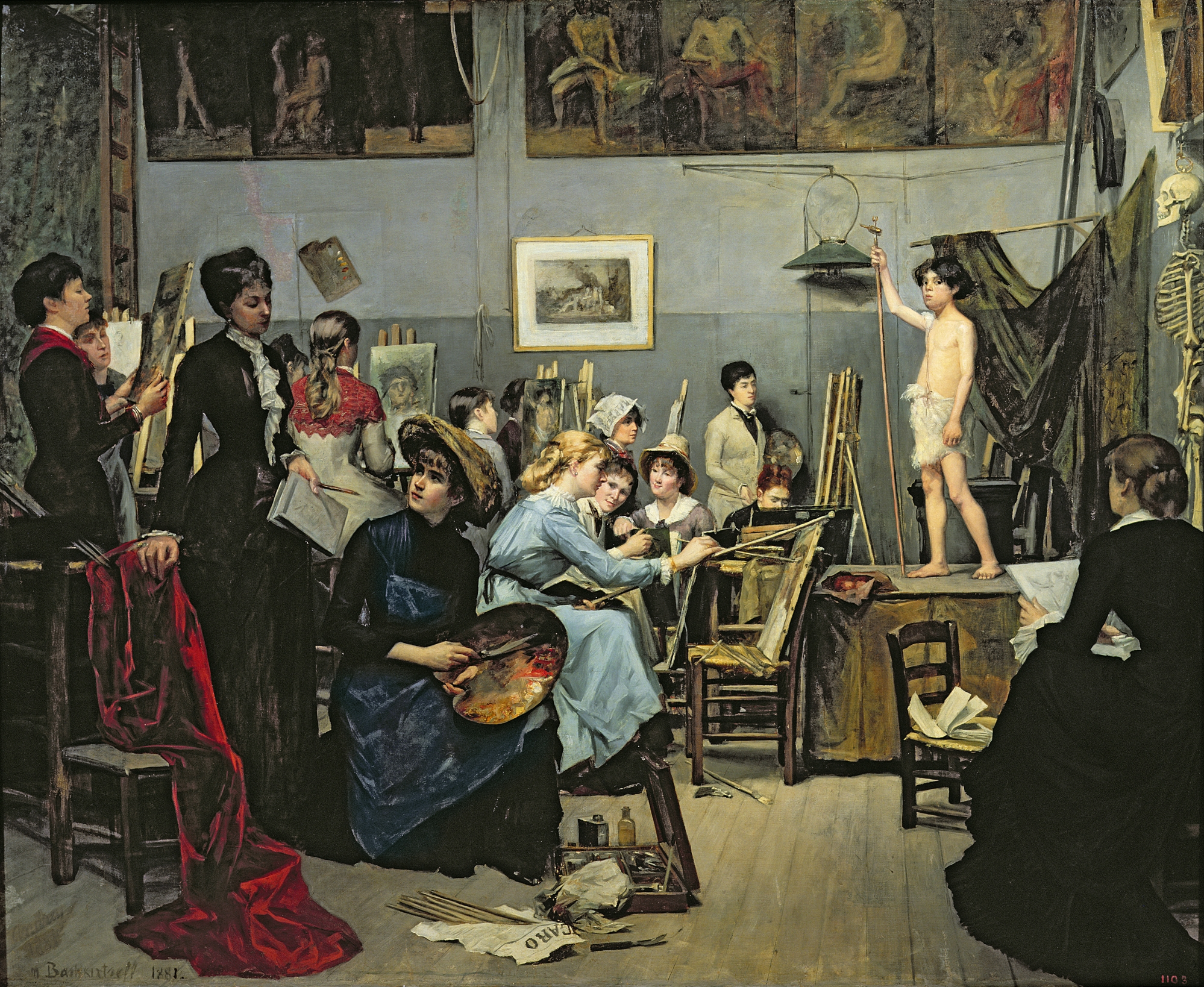
Maria Bashkirtseva, In the Studio, 1881, oil on canvas, 74 × 60.6 in, Dnipro State Art Museum

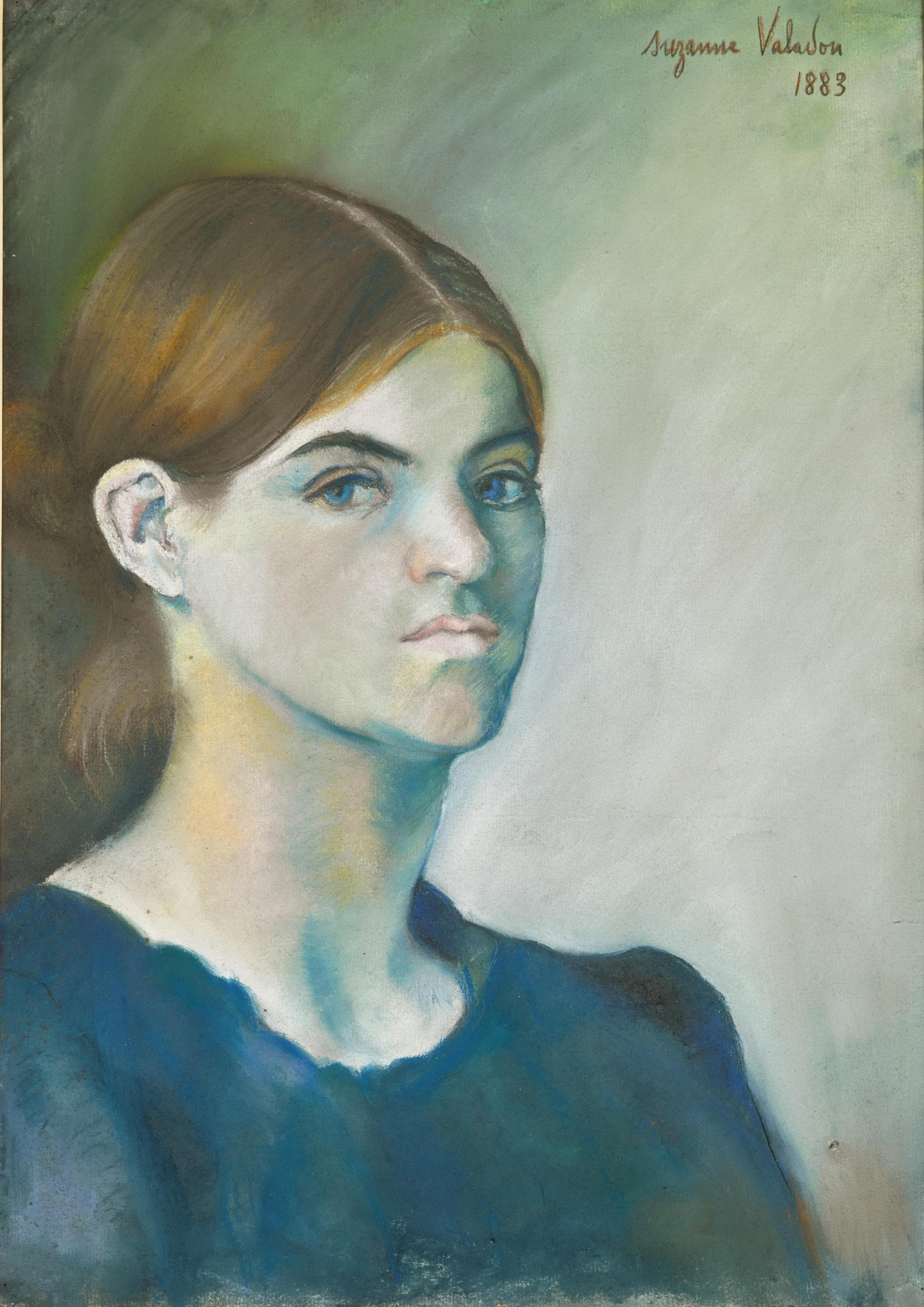
Suzanne Valadon, Self-portrait, 1883

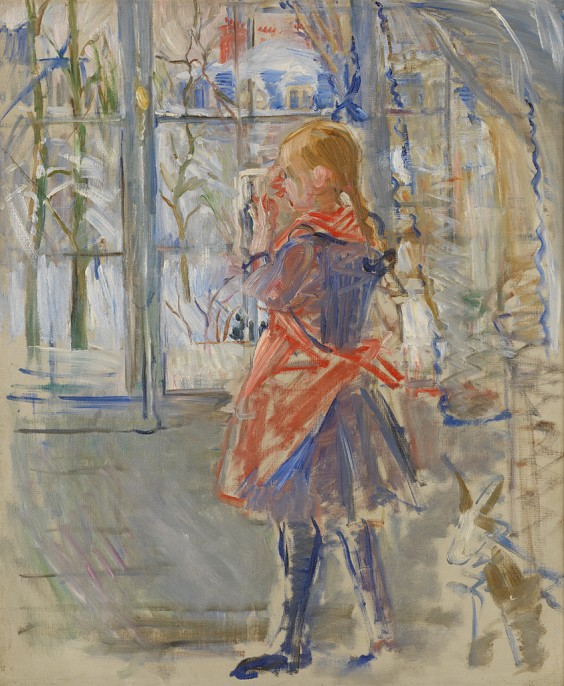
Berthe Morisot, L'Enfant au Tablier Rouge, 1886, American Art Museum

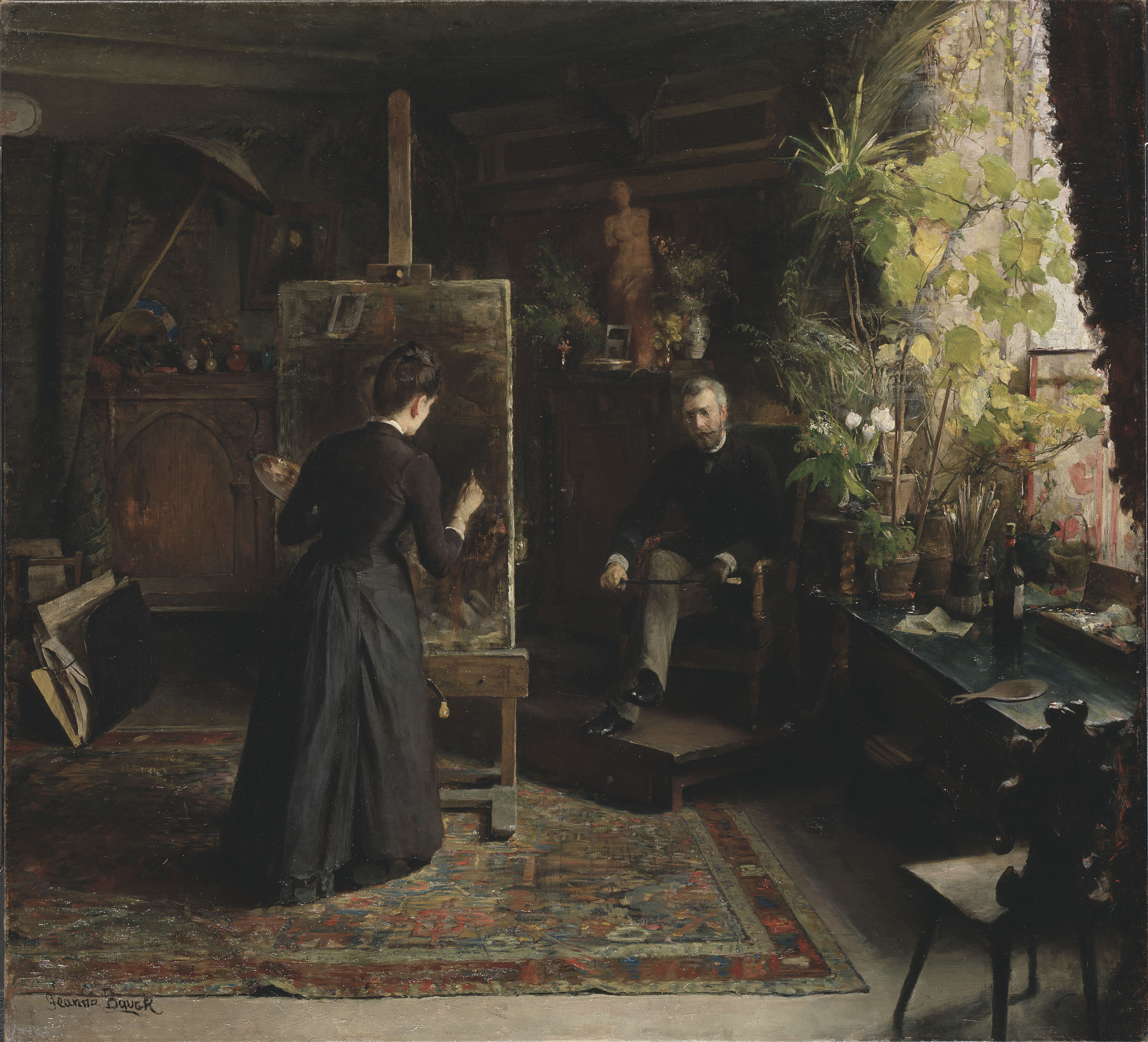
Jeanna Bauck, The Danish Artist Bertha Wegmann Painting a Portrait, late 19th century

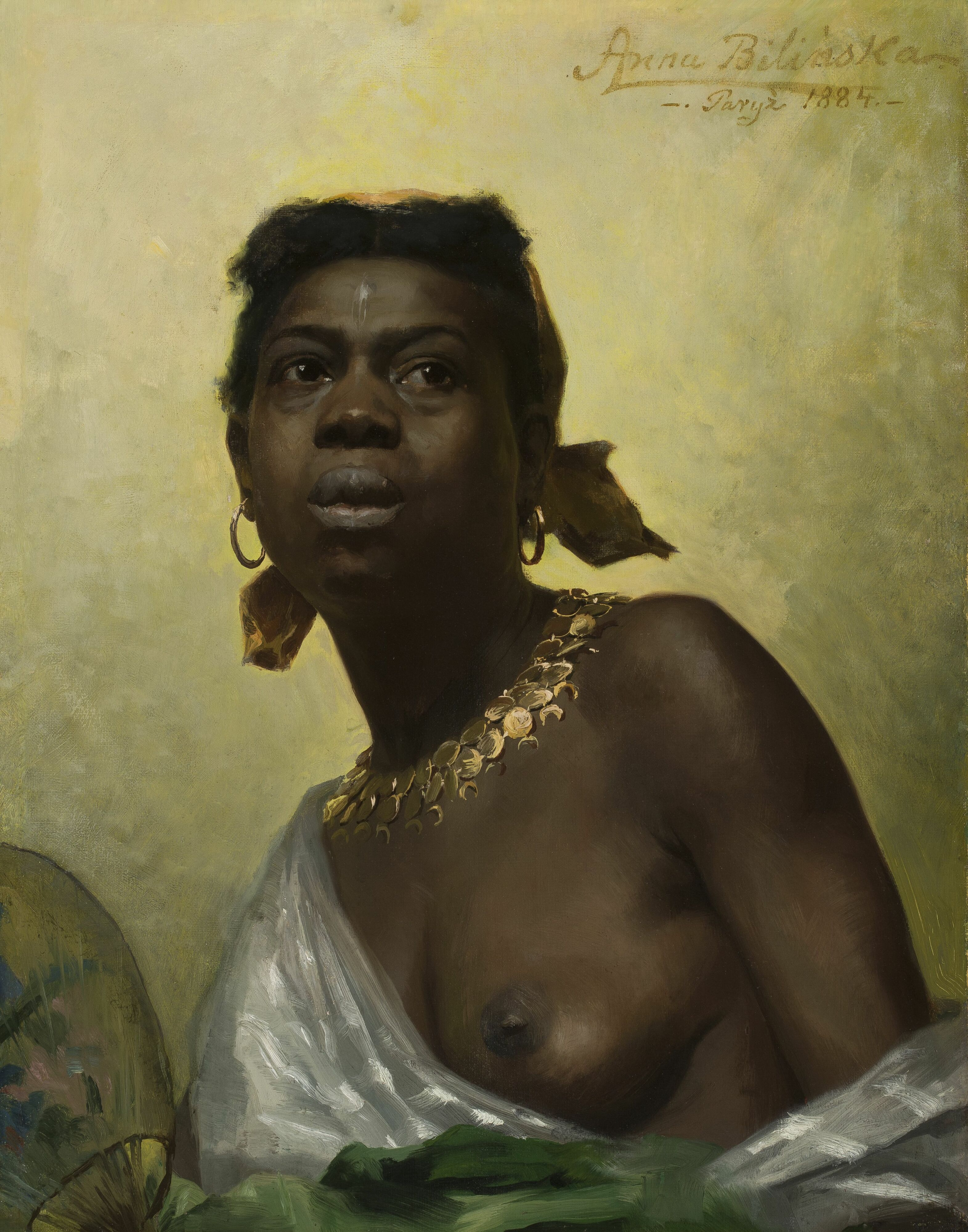
Anna Bilińska, A Negress, 1884, National Museum in Warsaw

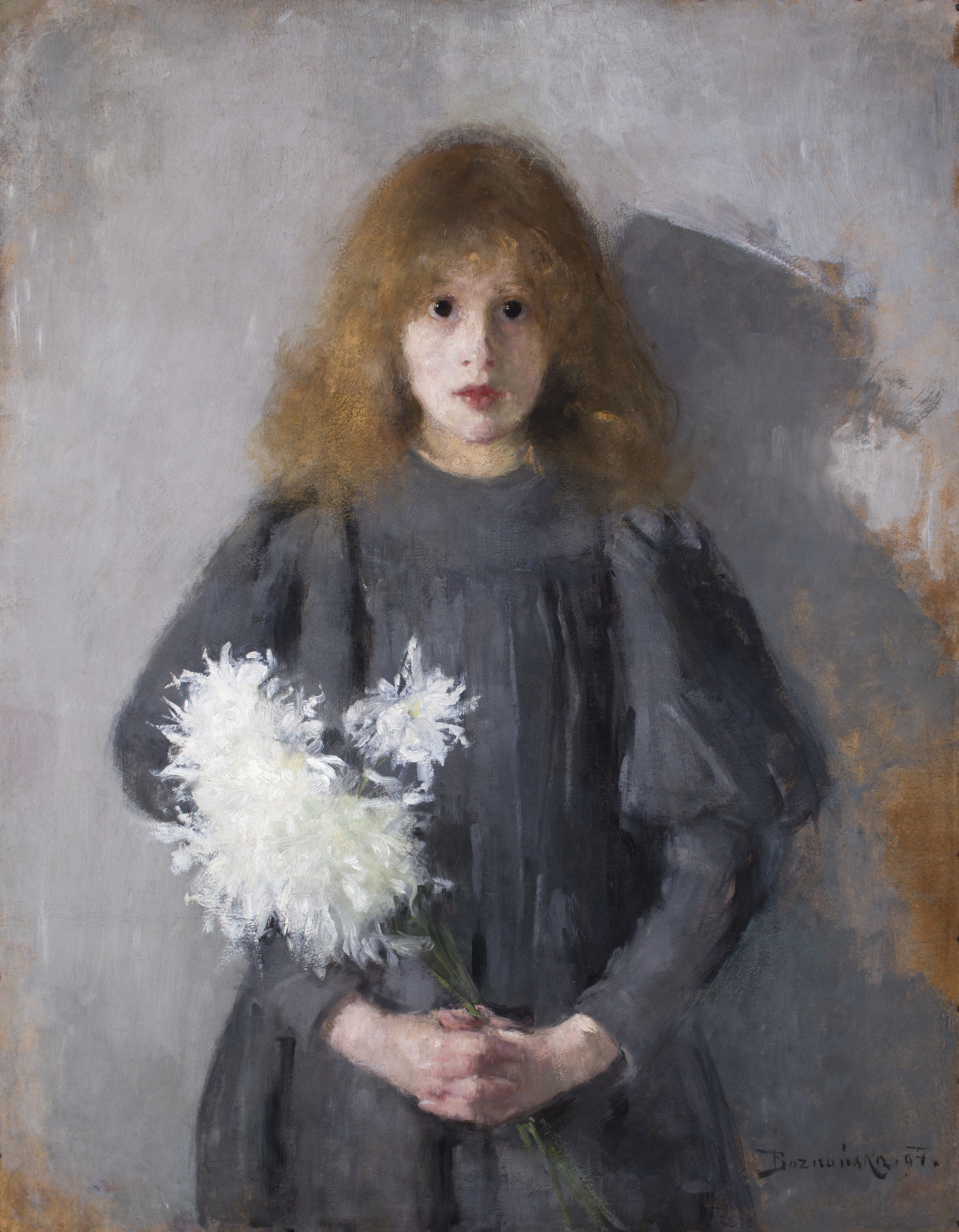
Olga Boznańska, Girl with Chrysanthemums, 1894, National Museum in Kraków

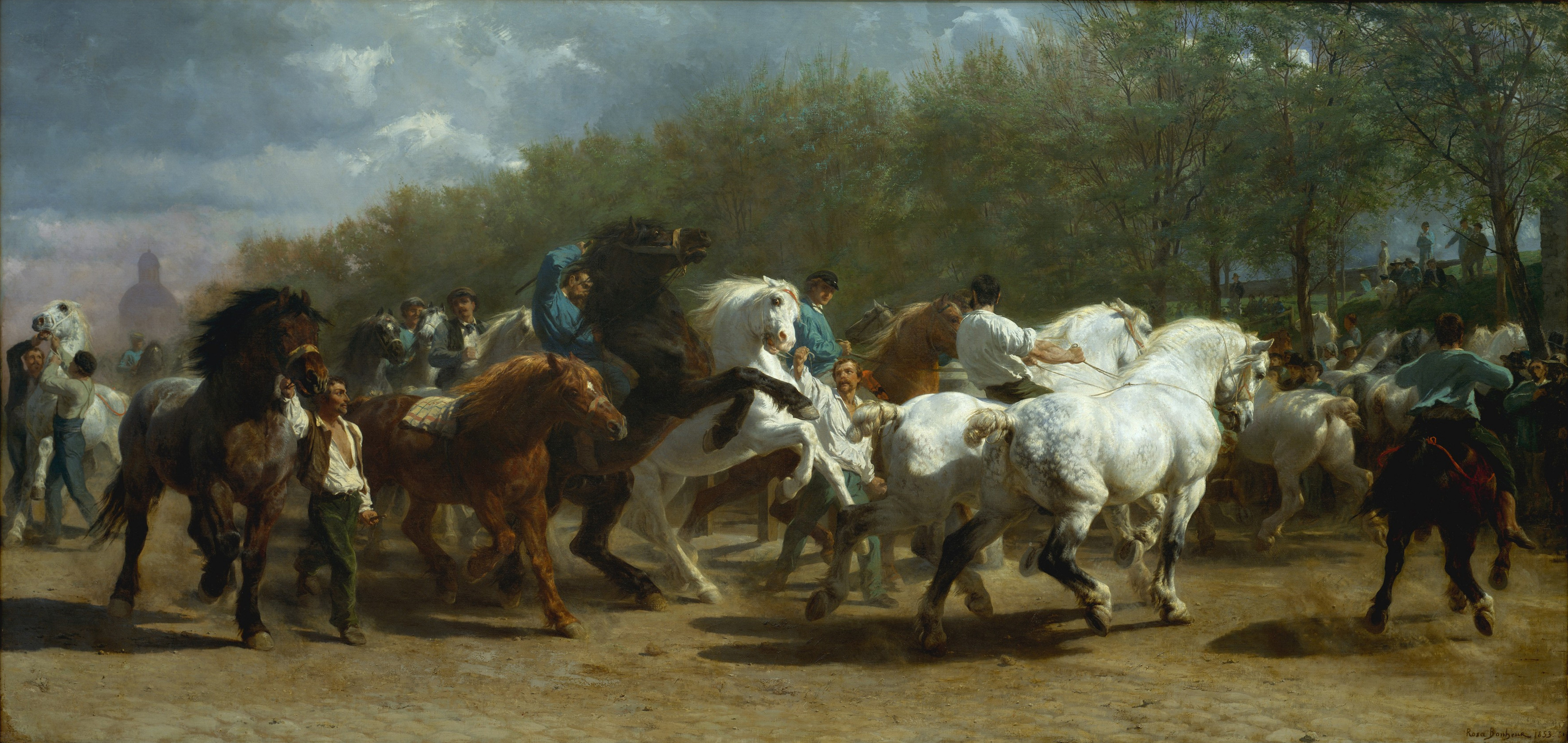
Rosa Bonheur, The Horse Fair, 1853–1855, Metropolitan Museum of Art, New York

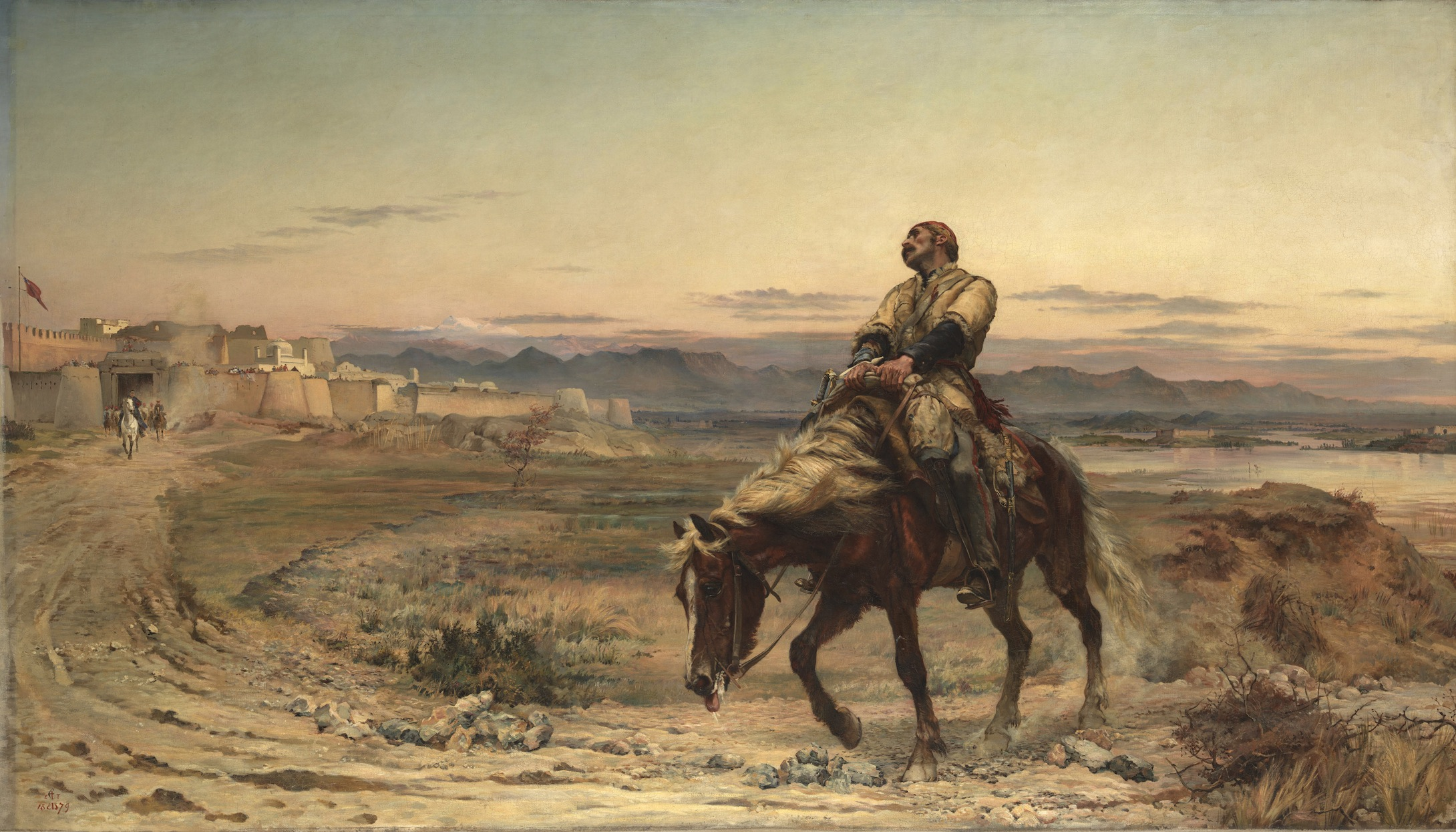
Elizabeth Thompson, Remnants of an Army, 1879, Tate. She specialized in military scenes.

Honō (焔, Flame), 1918. Tokyo National Museum by Uemura Shōen

=== Sculpture ===
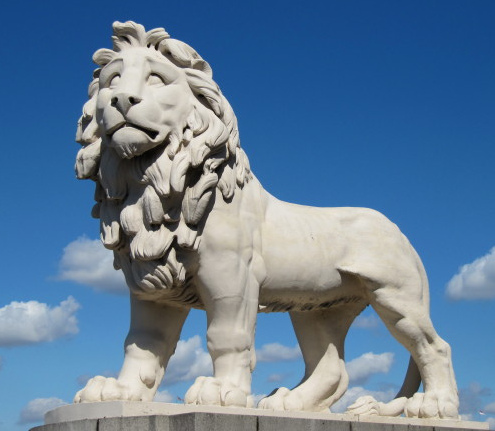
The South Bank Lion in Coade stone 1837, London

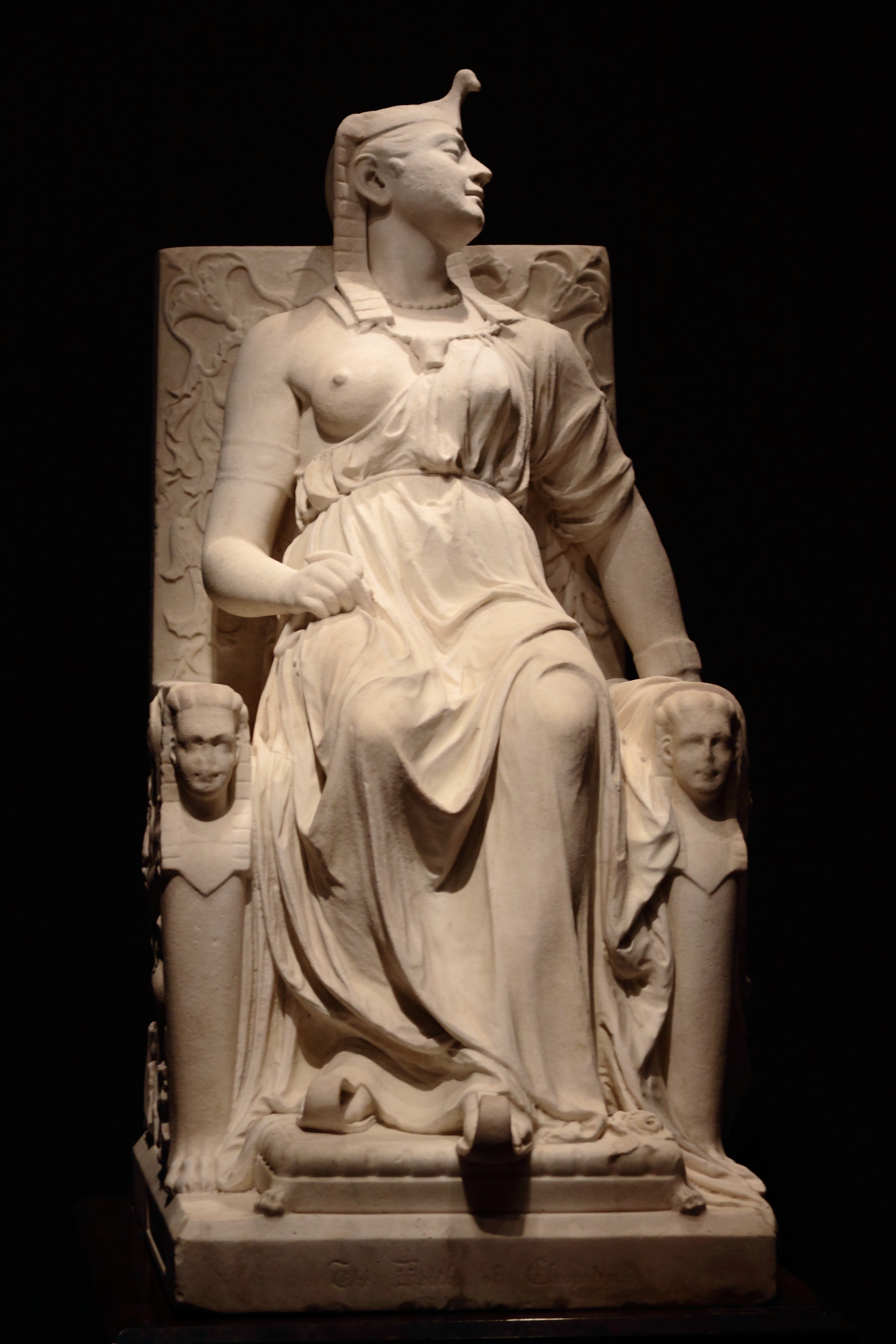
Edmonia Lewis The Death of Cleopatra, marble, 1876 Smithsonian American Art Museum

Eleanor Coade (1733 – 1821) became known in Georgian England for manufacturing Neoclassical statues, architectural decorations and garden ornaments made of Lithodipyra or Coade stone for over 50 years from 1769 until her death. Lithodipyra ("stone fired twice") was a high-quality, durable moulded weather-resistant, ceramic stoneware. Statues and decorative features from this ceramic still look almost new today. Coade did not invent 'artificial stone', but she likely perfected both the clay recipe and the firing process. She combined high-quality manufacturing and artistic taste, together with entrepreneurial, business and marketing skills, to create the overwhelmingly successful stone products of her age. She produced stoneware for St George's Chapel, Windsor, The Royal Pavilion, Brighton, Carlton House, London and the Royal Naval College, Greenwich.

Eleanor Coade developed her own talent as a modeller, exhibiting around 30 sculptures on classical themes at the Society of Artists between 1773 and 1780 as listed in their exhibitors catalogue of the time. After her death, her Coade stoneware was used for refurbishments to Buckingham Palace and by noted sculptors in their monumental work, such as William Frederick Woodington's South Bank Lion (1837) on Westminster Bridge, London. The statue was made in separate parts and sealed together on an iron frame.

The century produced its women sculptors in the East, Seiyodo Bunshojo (1764–1838) a Japanese netsuke carver and Haiku writer. She was Seiyodo Tomiharu's daughter. Her work can be seen at the Walters Art Museum. While in the West, there were: Julie Charpentier, Elisabet Ney, Helene Bertaux, Fenia Chertkoff, Sarah Fisher Ames, Helena Unierzyska (daughter of Jan Matejko), Blanche Moria, Angelina Beloff, Anna Golubkina, Margaret Giles (also a Medalist), Camille Claudel, Enid Yandell and Edmonia Lewis. Lewis, an African-Ojibwe-Haitian American artist from New York began her art studies at Oberlin College. Her sculpting career began in 1863. She established a studio in Rome, Italy and exhibited her marble sculptures through Europe and the United States.

=== Photography ===
Constance Fox Talbot may be the first woman ever to have taken a photograph. Later, Julia Margaret Cameron and Gertrude Kasebier became well known in the new medium of photography, where there were no traditional restrictions, and no established training, to hold them back. Sophia Hoare, another British photographer, worked in Tahiti and other parts of Oceania.

In France, the birthplace of the medium, there was only Geneviève Élisabeth Disdéri (c.1817–1878). In 1843, she married the pioneering photographer André-Adolphe-Eugène Disdéri, partnering with him in their Brest daguerreotype studio from the late 1840s. After her husband left for Paris in 1852, Geneviève continued to run the atelier alone. She is remembered for her 28 views of Brest, mainly architectural, which were published as Brest et ses Environs in 1856. In 1872, she moved to Paris, opening a studio in the Rue du Bac where she was possibly assisted by her son Jules. Trade listings indicate she continued to operate her studio until her death in a Paris hospital in 1878. She was one of the first female professional photographers in the world, active only shortly after the German Bertha Beckmann and the Swedes Brita Sofia Hesselius and Marie Kinnberg.

=== Female education in the 19th century ===
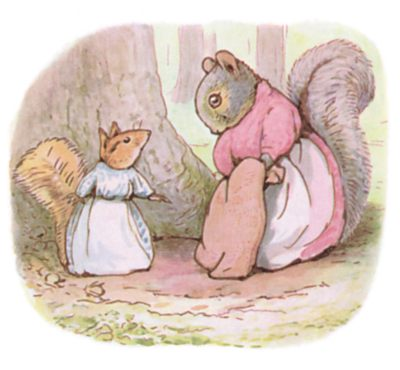
Beatrix Potter's Goody and Mrs. Hackee, illustration to The Tale of Timmy Tiptoes, 1911

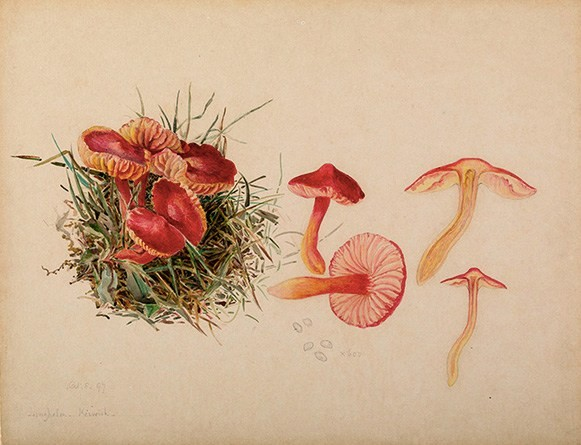
Beatrix Potter, reproductive system of Hygrocybe coccinea, 1897

During the century, access to academies and formal art training expanded more for women in Europe and North America. The British Government School of Design, which later became the Royal College of Art, admitted women from its founding in 1837, but only into a "Female School" which was treated somewhat differently, with "life"- classes consisting for several years of drawing a man wearing a suit of armour.

The Royal Academy Schools finally admitted women beginning in 1861, but students drew initially only draped models. However, other schools in London, including the Slade School of Art from the 1870s, were more liberal. By the end of the century women were able to study the naked, or very nearly naked, figure in many Western European and North American cities. The Society of Female Artists (now called The Society of Women Artists) was established in 1855 in London and has staged annual exhibitions since 1857, when 358 works were shown by 149 women, some using a pseudonym. However, one woman who was denied higher or specialist education and who still "broke through", was the natural scientist, writer and illustrator, Beatrix Potter (1866–1943).

=== English women painters from the early 19th century who exhibited at the Royal Academy of Art ===
- Sophie Gengembre Anderson
- Mary Baker
- Ann Charlotte Bartholomew
- Maria Bell
- Barbara Bodichon
- Joanna Mary Boyce
- Margaret Sarah Carpenter
- Fanny Corbaux
- Rosa Corder
- Mary Ellen Edwards
- Harriet Gouldsmith
- Mary Harrison
- Jane Benham Hay
- Anna Mary Howitt
- Mary Moser
- Martha Darley Mutrie
- Ann Mary Newton
- Emily Mary Osborn
- Kate Perugini
- Louise Rayner
- Ellen Sharples
- Rolinda Sharples
- Rebecca Solomon
- Elizabeth Emma Soyer
- Isabelle de Steiger
- Henrietta Ward

== 20th century ==
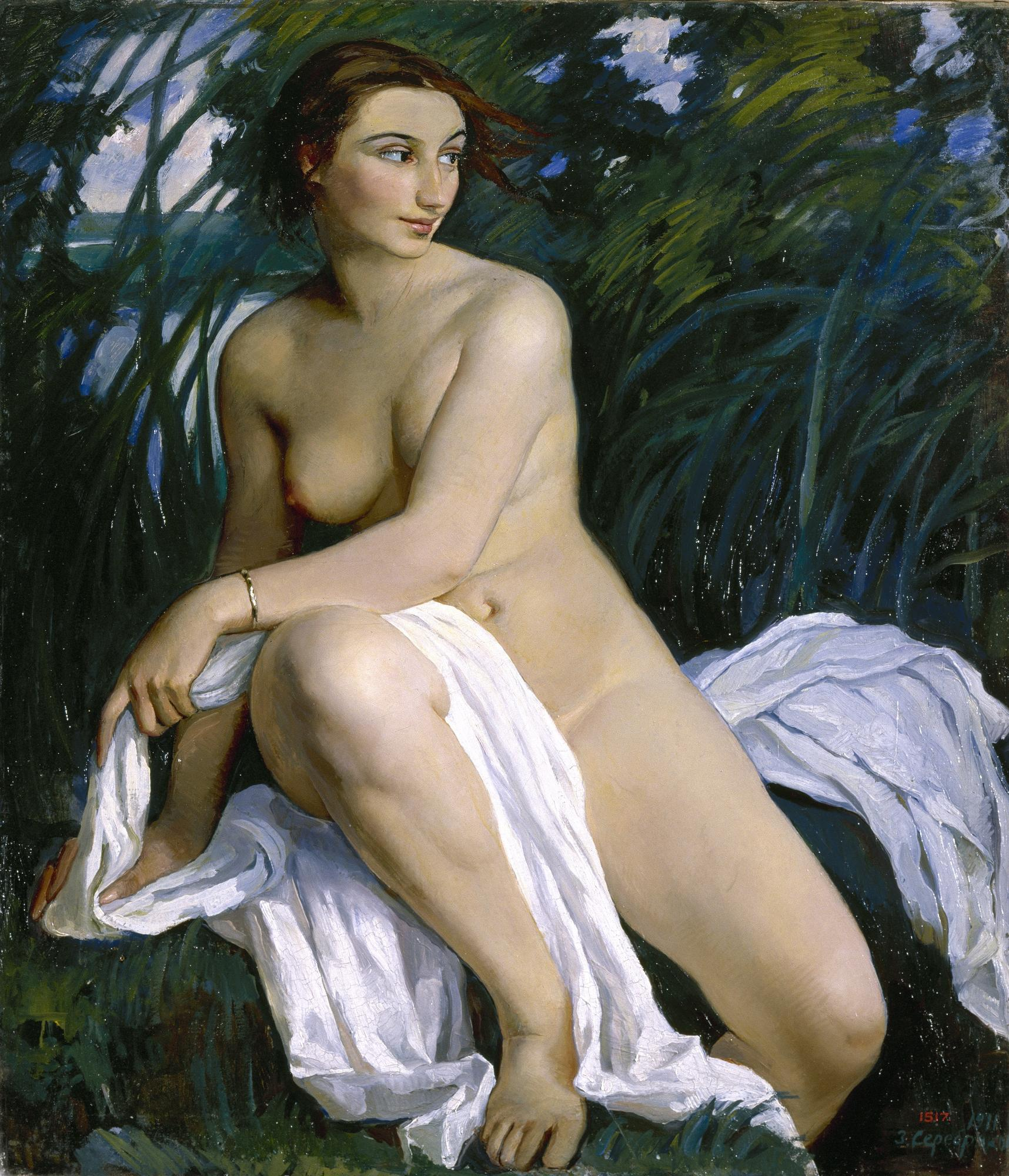
Zinaida Serebriakova, Nude, 1911

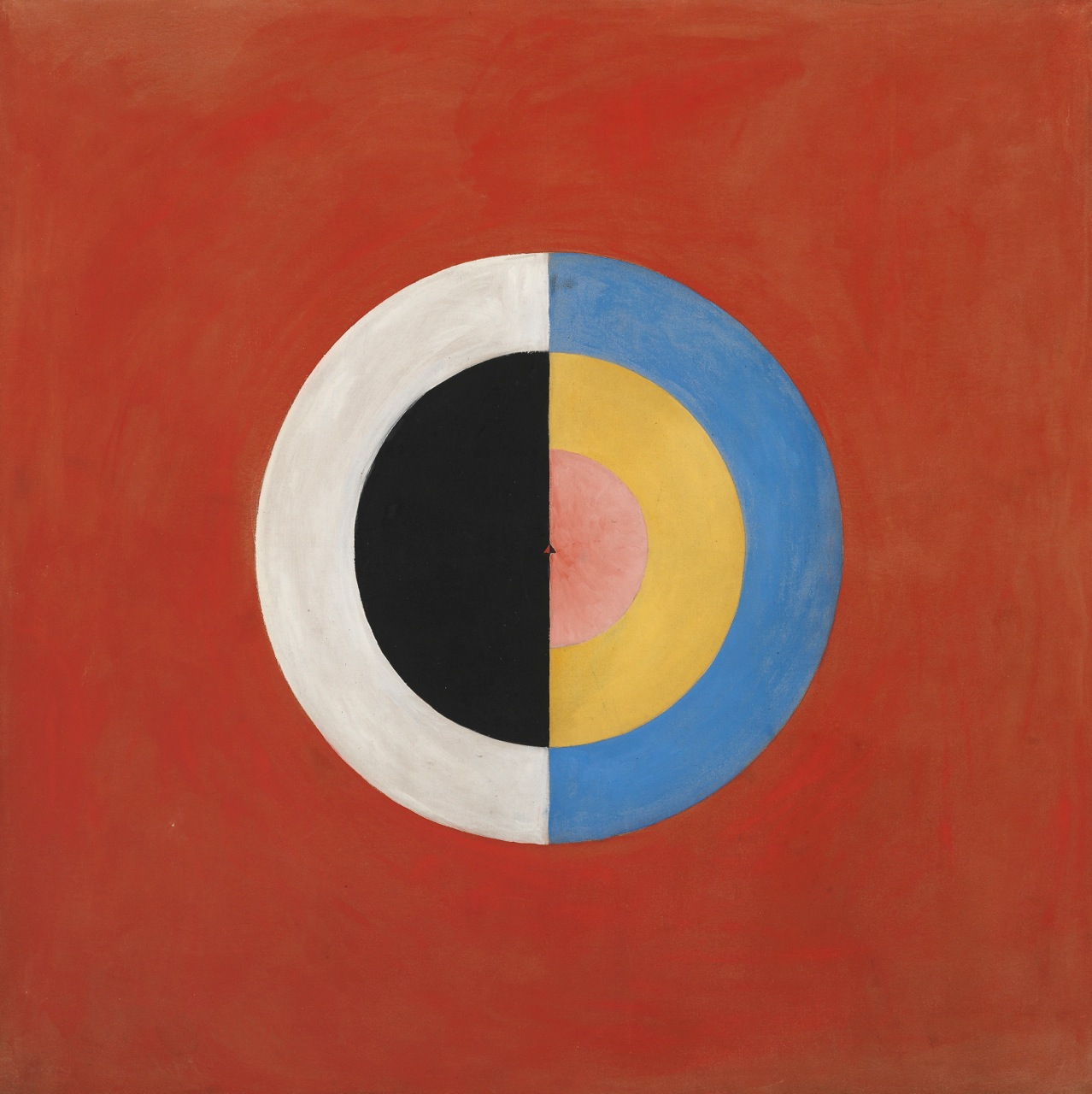
Hilma af Klint, Svanen (The Swan), No. 17, Group IX, Series SUW, October 1914 – March 1915. This abstract work was never exhibited during af Klint's lifetime.

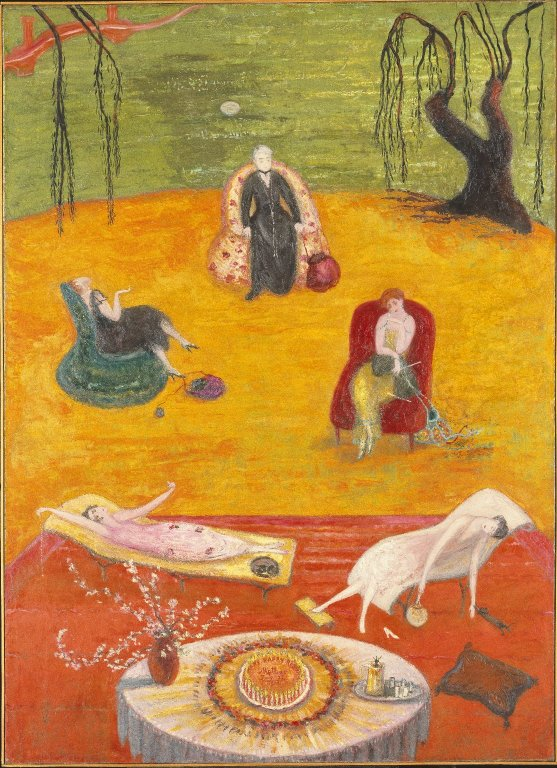
Florine Stettheimer, Heat, c. 1919, Brooklyn Museum

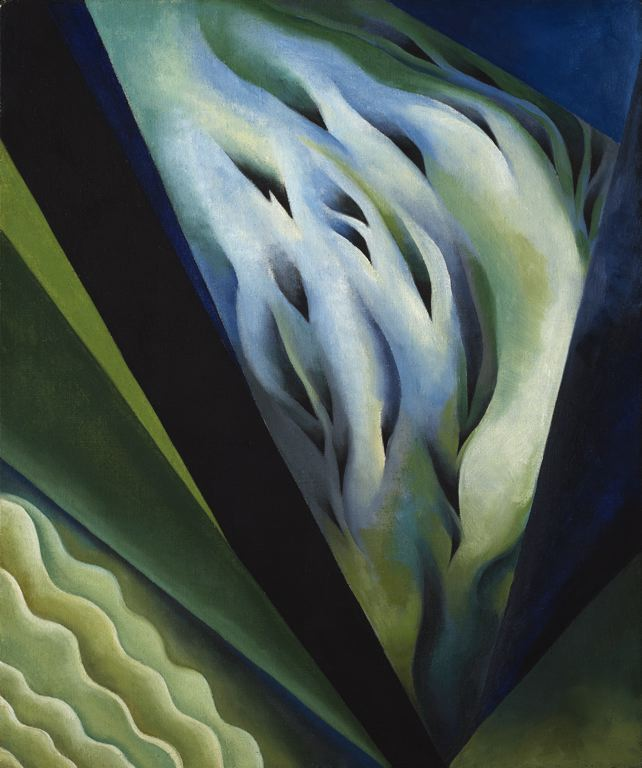
Georgia O'Keeffe, Blue and Green Music, 1921, oil on canvas

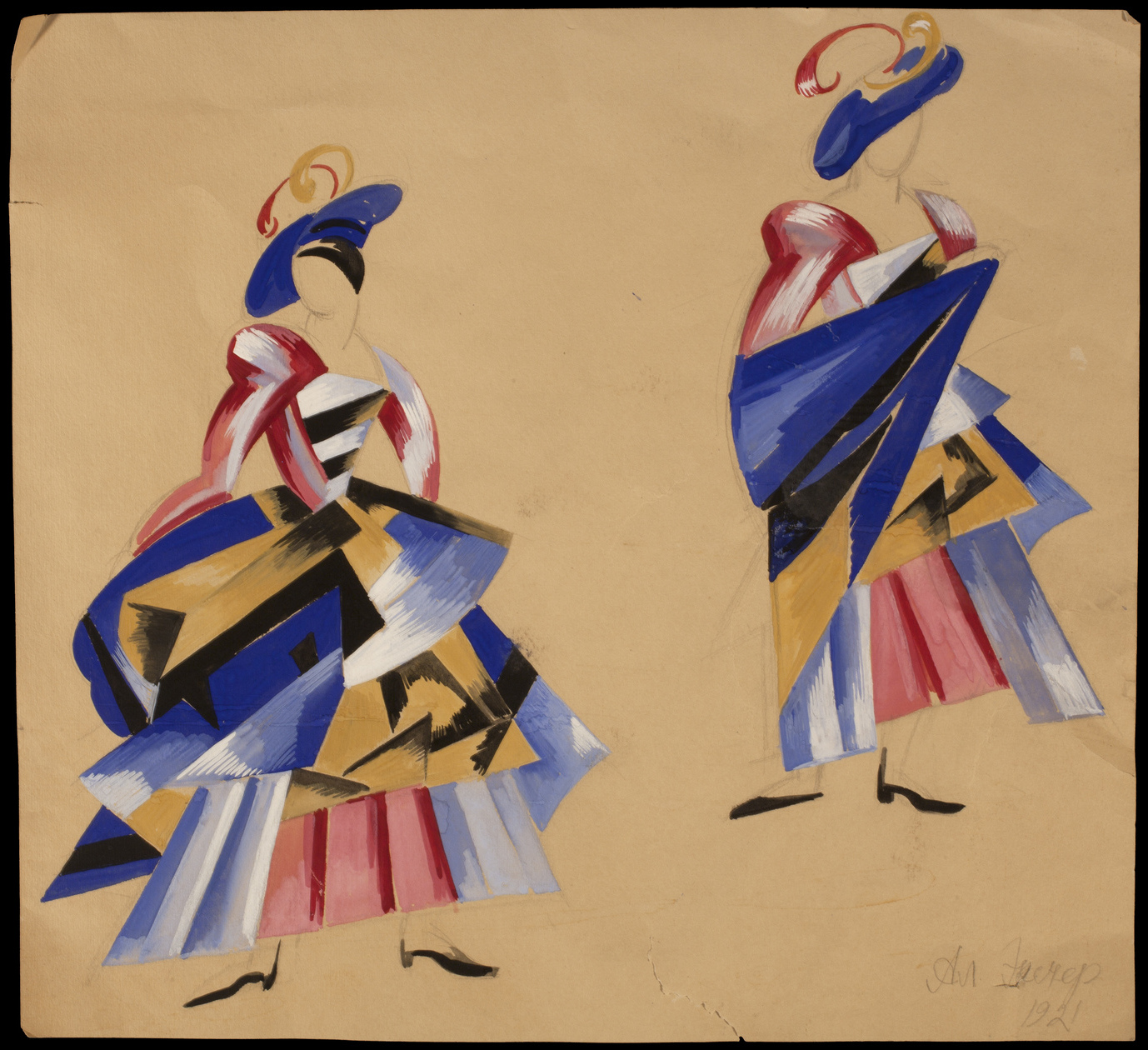
Aleksandra Ekster, Costume design for Romeo and Juliette, 1921, M.T. Abraham Foundation

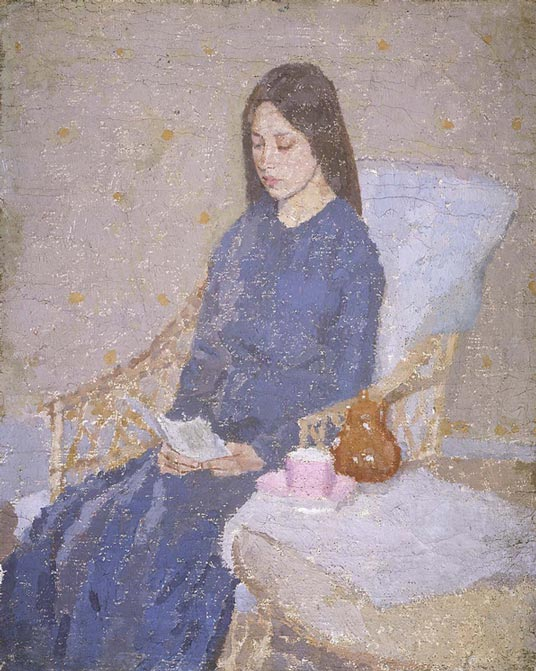
Gwen John, The Convalescent (ca. 1923–24), one of ten versions of this composition

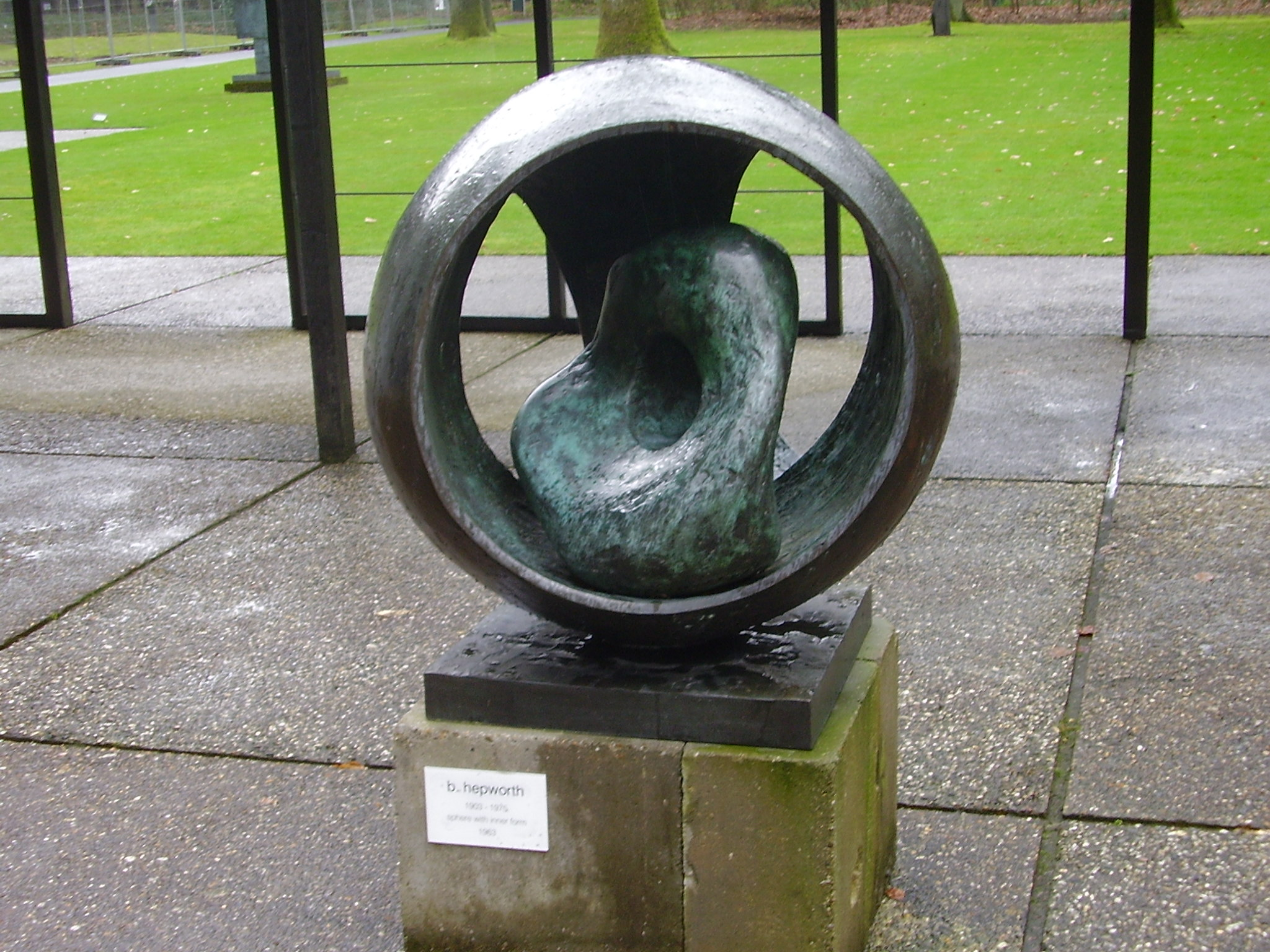
Barbara Hepworth,Sphere with Inner Form, 1963, Kröller-Müller Museum, Otterlo, the Netherlands

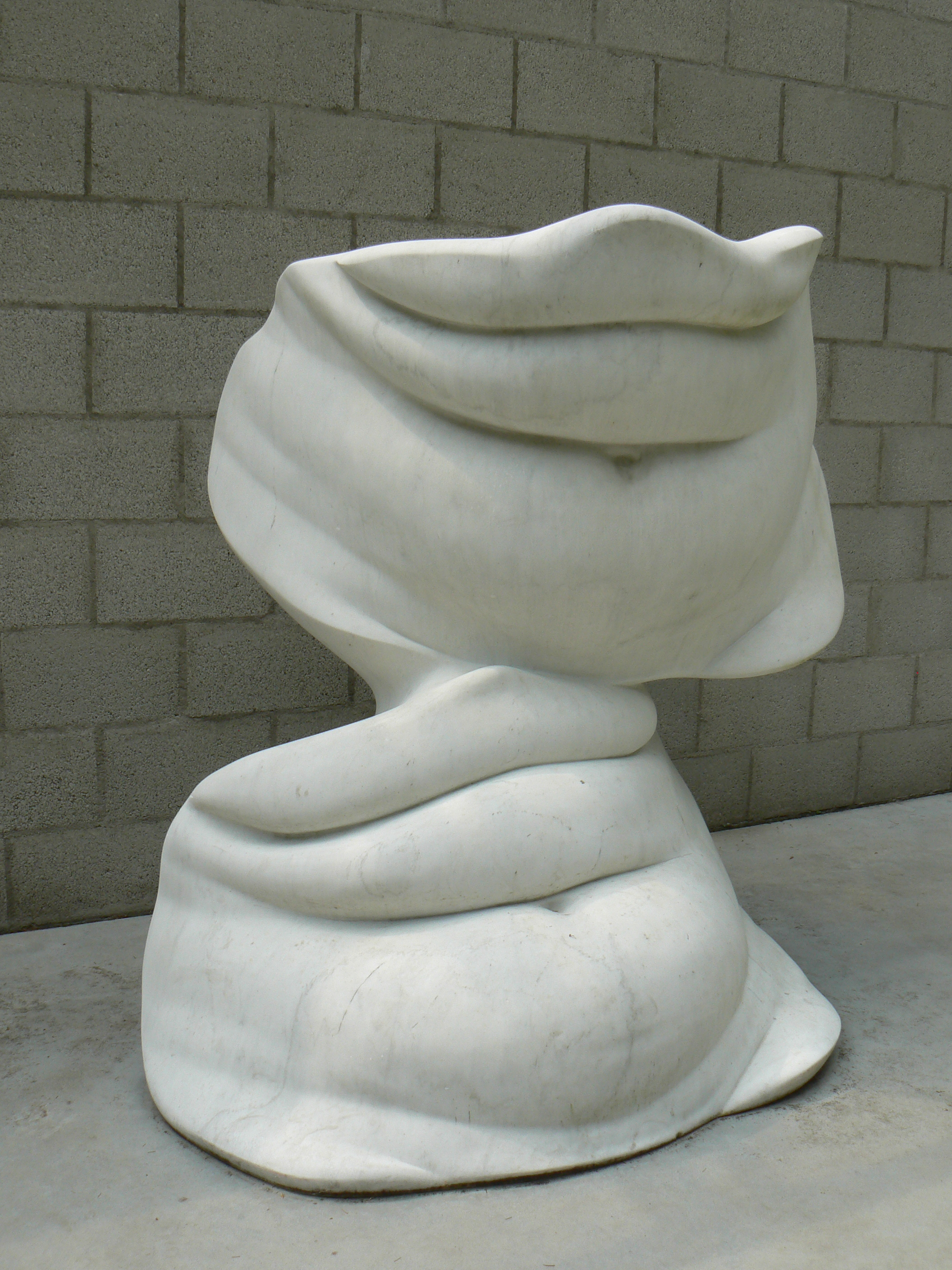
Alina Szapocznikow, Grands Ventres, 1968, Kröller-Müller Museum

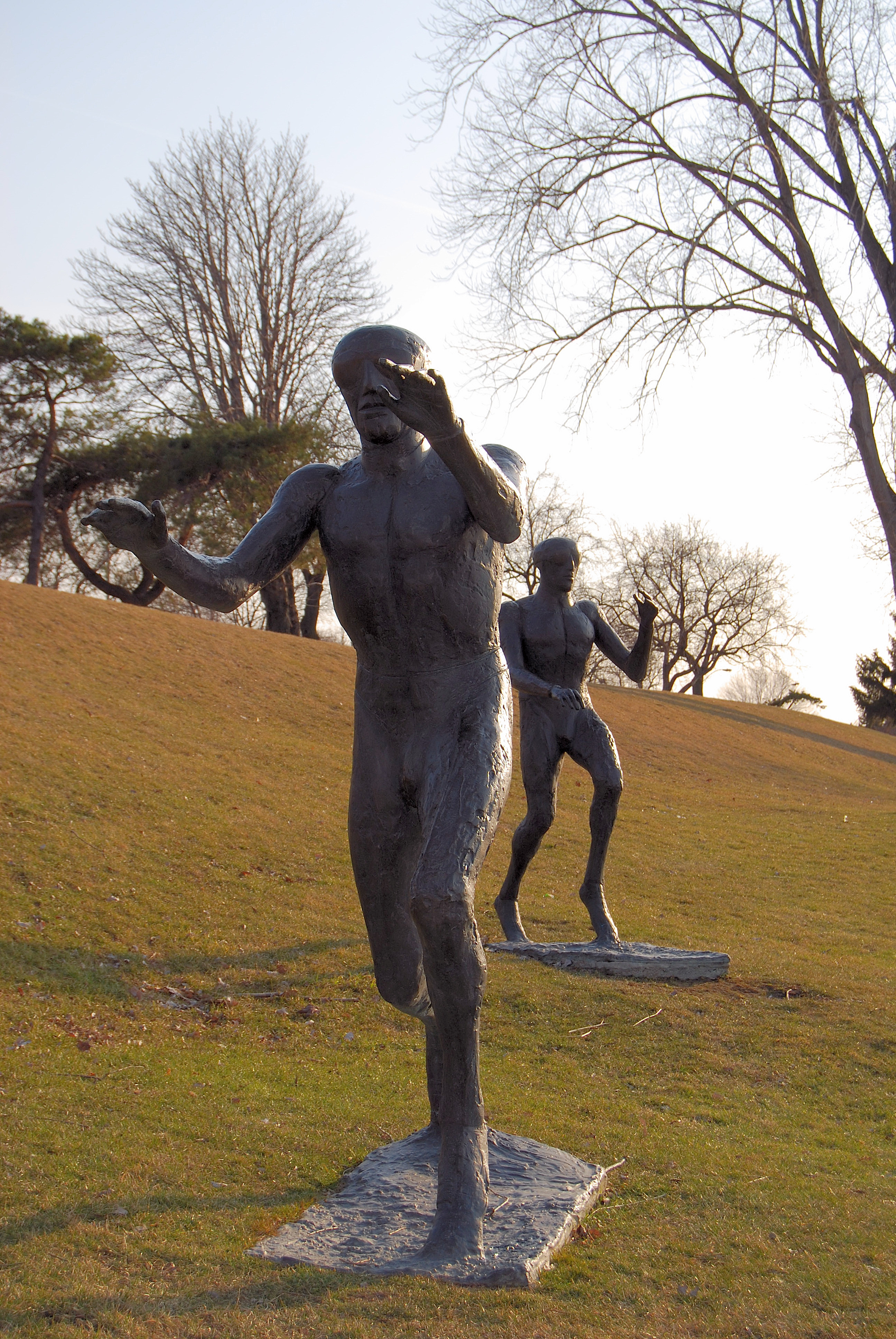
Elisabeth Frink, Flying Men, Odette Sculpture Park Windsor, Ontario

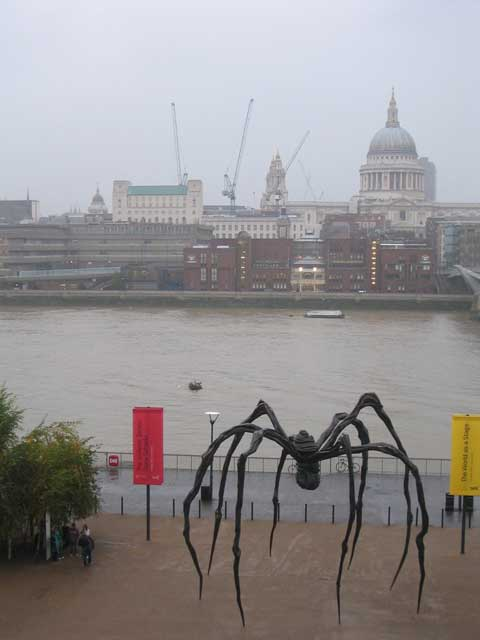
Louise Bourgeois, Maman against the Thames, London

Self-portrait in a Velvet Dress, 1926 by Frida Kahlo

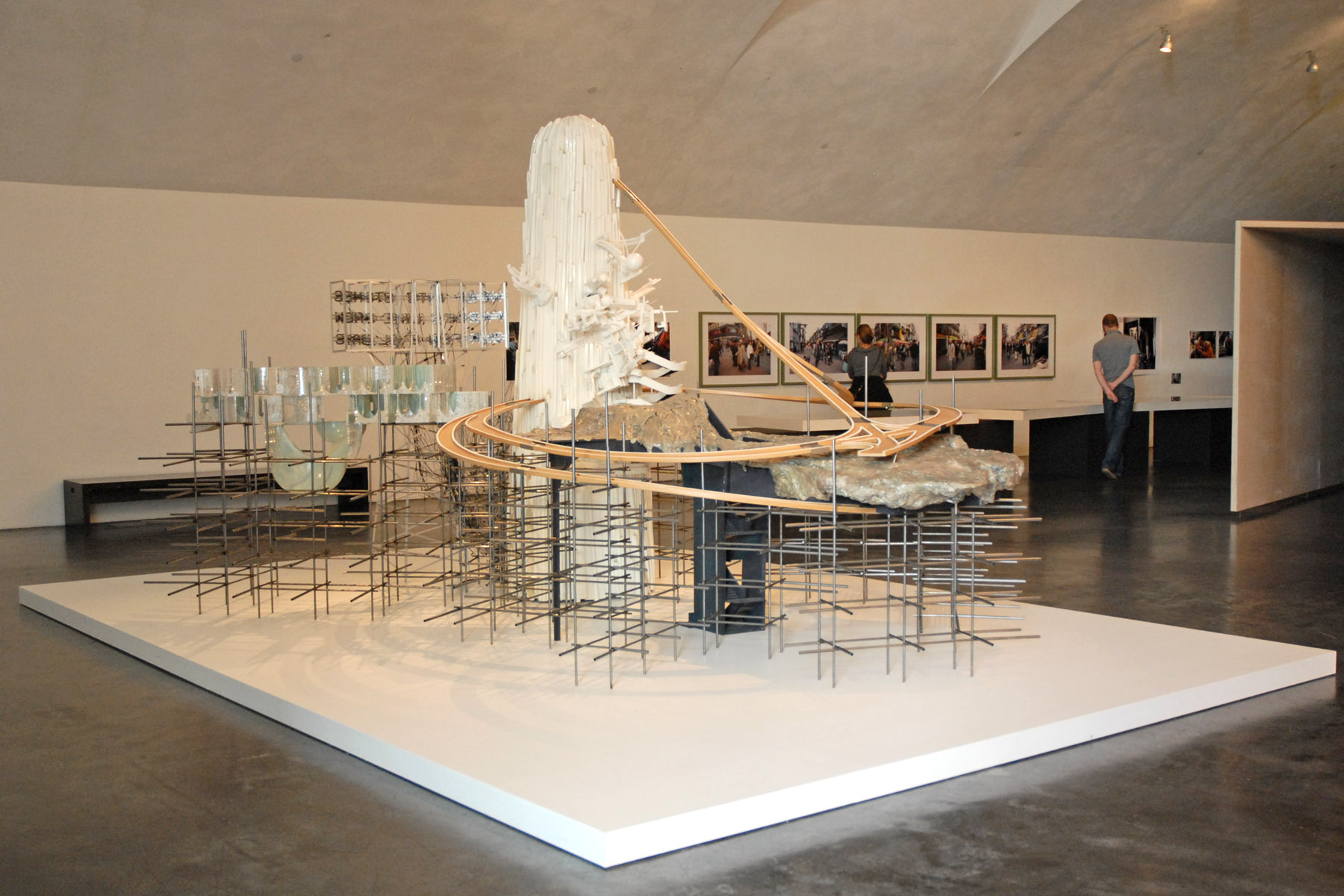
Mon Grand Recit: Weep into Stones (2005) by Lee Bul

Notable women artists from this period include:

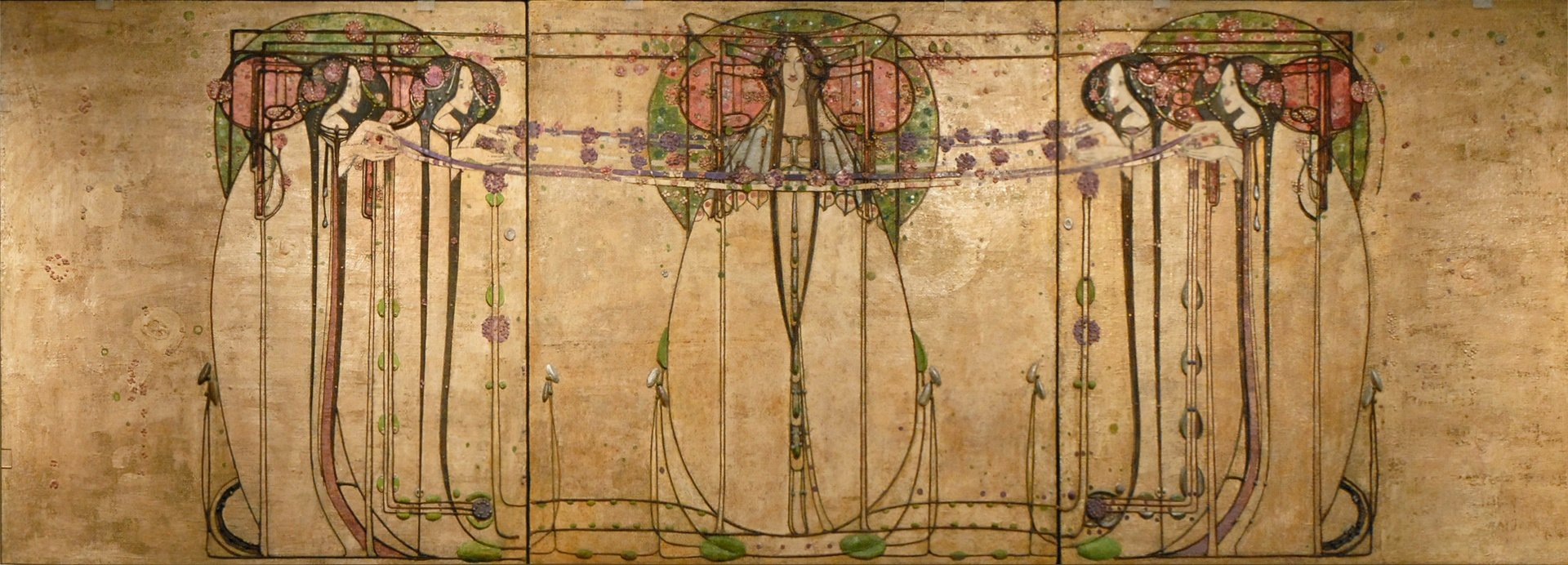
Margaret Macdonald Mackintosh, The May Queen, 1900

Elene Akhvlediani, Hannelore Baron, Vanessa Bell, Lee Bontecou, Louise Bourgeois, Romaine Brooks, Emily Carr, Leonora Carrington, Mary Cassatt, Elizabeth Catlett, Camille Claudel, Sonia Delaunay, Marthe Donas, Joan Eardley, Marisol Escobar, Dulah Marie Evans, Audrey Flack, Mary Frank, Helen Frankenthaler, Elisabeth Frink, Wilhelmina Weber Furlong, Françoise Gilot, Natalia Goncharova, Nancy Graves, Grace Hartigan, Barbara Hepworth, Eva Hesse, Sigrid Hjertén, Hannah Höch, Frances Hodgkins, Malvina Hoffman, Irma Hünerfauth, Margaret Ponce Israel, Gwen John, Elaine de Kooning, Käthe Kollwitz, Lee Krasner, Frida Kahlo, Hilma af Klint, Laura Knight, Barbara Kruger, Marie Laurencin, Tamara de Lempicka, Séraphine Louis, Dora Maar, Margaret Macdonald Mackintosh, Maruja Mallo, Agnes Martin, Ana Mendieta, Joan Mitchell, Paula Modersohn-Becker, Gabriele Münter, Alice Neel, Louise Nevelson, Georgia O'Keeffe, Betty Parsons, Aniela Pawlikowska, Orovida Camille Pissarro, Irene Rice Pereira, Paula Rego, Bridget Riley, Verónica Ruiz de Velasco, Anne Ryan, Charlotte Salomon, Augusta Savage, Zofia Stryjeńska, Zinaida Serebriakova, Sarai Sherman, Henrietta Shore, Sr. Maria Stanisia, Marjorie Strider, Carrie Sweetser, Annie Louisa Swynnerton, Franciszka Themerson, Suzanne Valadon, Remedios Varo, Maria Helena Vieira da Silva, Nellie Walker, Marianne von Werefkin and Ogura Yuki.

Hilma af Klint (1862–1944) was a pioneer abstract painter, working long before her abstract expressionist male counterparts. She was Swedish and regularly exhibited her paintings dealing with realism, but the abstract works were not shown until 20 years after her death, at her request. She considered herself to be a spiritualist and mystic.

Margaret Macdonald Mackintosh (1865–1933) was a Scottish artist whose works helped define the "Glasgow Style" of the 1890s and early 20th century. She often collaborated with her husband, the architect and designer Charles Rennie Mackintosh, in works that had influence in Europe. She exhibited with Mackintosh at the 1900 Vienna Secession, where her work is thought to have had an influence on the Secessionists such as Gustav Klimt.

Annie Louisa Swynnerton (1844–1933) was a portrait, landscape and 'symbolist' artist, considered by her peers, such as John Singer Sargent and Edward Burne-Jones as one of the finest and most creative artists of her era, but was still not allowed access to mainstream art school training. She moved abroad to study at the Académie Julian and spent much of her life in France and Rome where the more liberal attitudes allowed her to express a broad range of compositional subjects. She was still not formally recognized in Britain until 1923 at the age of 76 when she became the first female admitted to the Royal Academy of Arts.

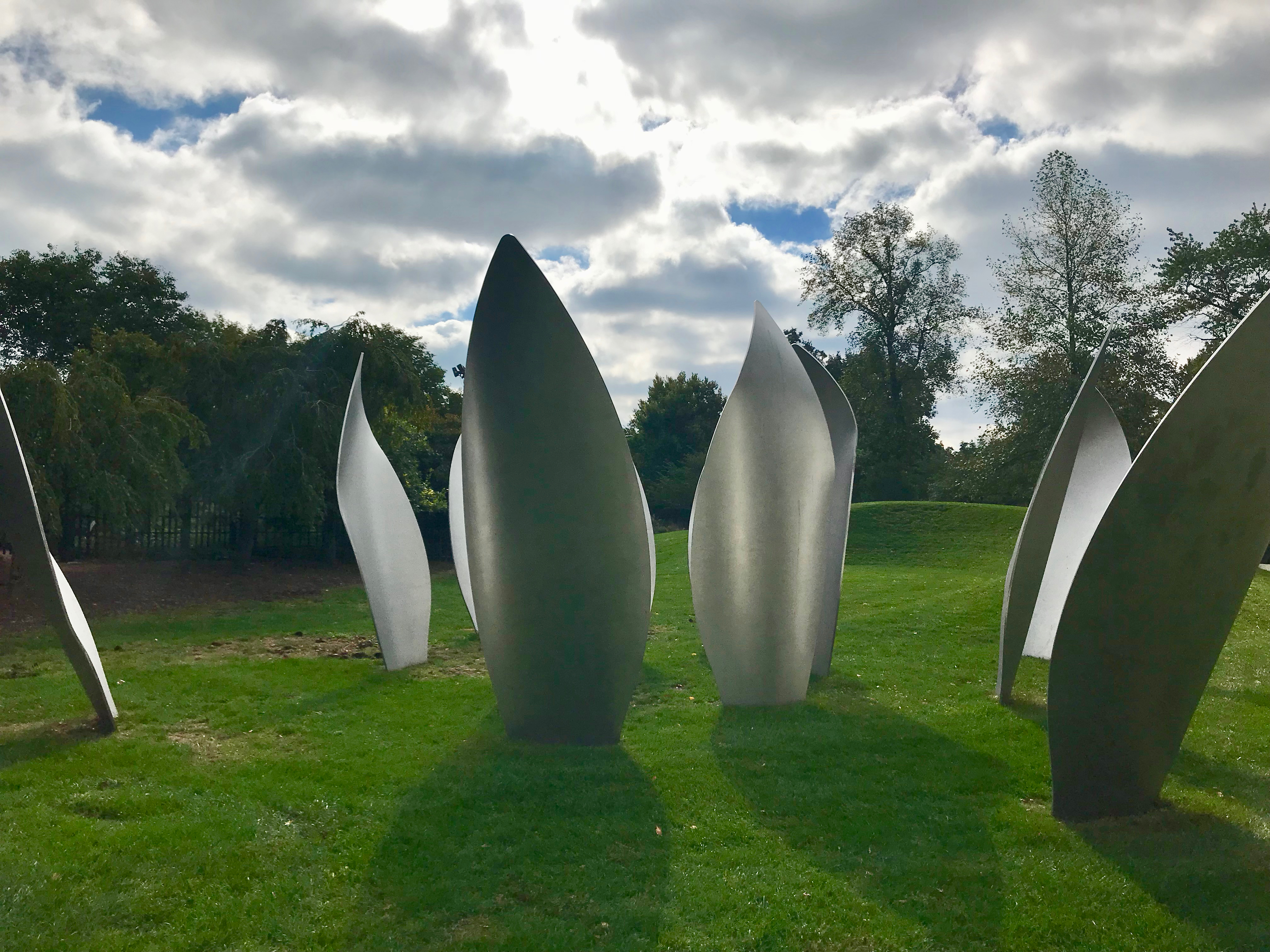
Skylanding – Jackson Park, Chicago by Yoko Ono

Wilhelmina Weber Furlong (1878–1962) was an early American modernist in New York City. She made significant contributions to modern American art through her work at the Art Students League and the Whitney Studio Club. Aleksandra Ekster and Lyubov Popova were Constructivist, Cubo-Futurist, and Suprematist artists well known and respected in Kiev, Moscow and Paris in the early 20th century. Among the other women artists prominent in the Russian avant-garde were Natalia Goncharova, Varvara Stepanova and Nadezhda Udaltsova. Sonia Delaunay and her husband were the founders of Orphism.

In the Art Deco era, Hildreth Meière made large-scale mosaics and was the first woman honored with the Fine Arts Medal of the American Institute of Architects. Tamara de Lempicka, also of this era, was an Art Deco painter from Poland. Sr. Maria Stanisia became a notable portraitist, mainly of clergy. Georgia O'Keeffe was born in the late 19th century. She became known for her paintings, featuring flowers, bones, and landscapes of New Mexico. In 1927, Dod Procter's painting Morning was voted Picture of the Year in the Royal Academy Summer Exhibition, and bought by the Daily Mail for the Tate gallery. Its popularity resulted in its showing in New York and a two-year tour of Britain. Surrealism, an important artistic style in the 1920s and 1930s, had a number of prominent women artists, including Leonora Carrington, Kay Sage, Dorothea Tanning, and Remedios Varo. There were also outliers, such as the British self-taught, often comedic observer, Beryl Cook (1926–2008).

Among East and Central European women artists, the following are noteworthy: Milein Cosman (1921–2017), Marie-Louise von Motesiczky (1906–1996), Else Meidner (1901–1987), Sanja Iveković (born 1949), Orshi Drozdik (born 1946)

=== Women photographers ===
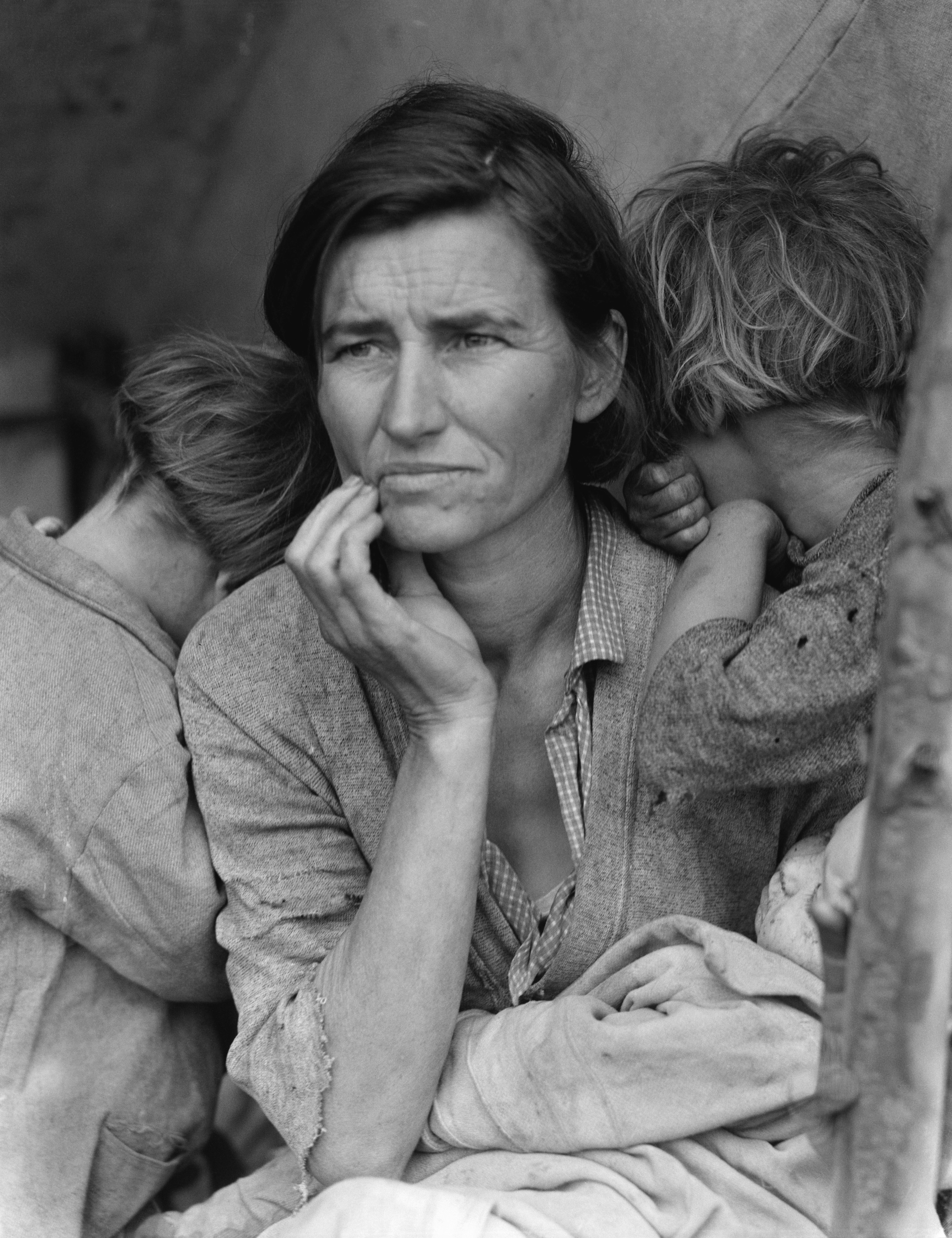
Dorothea Lange. Migrant Mother, (Florence Owens Thompson, and her family) c. 1936

Lee Miller rediscovered solarization and became a high fashion photographer. Dorothea Lange documented the Depression. Berenice Abbott created images of well known architecture and celebrity, Margaret Bourke-White created the industrial photographs that were featured on the cover and in the lead article of the first Life Magazine. Diane Arbus based her photography on outsiders to mainstream society. Graciela Iturbide's works dealt with Mexican life and feminism, while Tina Modotti produced "revolutionary icons" from Mexico in the 1920s. Annie Leibovitz's photographic work was of rock and roll and other celebrity figures. Other women to break through the glass ceiling have included: Eve Arnold, Marilyn Silverstone and Inge Morath of Magnum, Daphne Zileri, Anya Teixeira, Elsa Thiemann, Sabine Weiss and Xyza Cruz Bacani.

The 1970s were a generative decade for pioneering art in other ways. It was a “watershed moment in terms of arts’ relationship to mass media. A notable photographer was Cindy Sherman. She became part of a group of artists called the ‘Pictures Generation’ who made work that examined this relationship. Her work is made for an audience who have grown up not just with film and advertising but with television as part of their reality. Barbara Kruger, another key figure of the Pictures Generation, began borrowing advertising and graphic design techniques to explore power in the context of consumerist and patriarchal structures. The feminist movement that coincided with the emergence of these artists addressed issues around the emancipation of women, particularly reproductive rights and sexuality. Such issues have come back under the spotlight amid the rollback of legal rights regarding women's bodily autonomy in some Western nations.

=== Theatrical designers ===
Women graphic artists and illustrators, like the rare female cartoonist, Claire Bretécher, have made a generous contribution to their field. On a larger scale, among theatrical designers the following have been notable:

- Elizabeth Polunin
- Doris Zinkeisen
- Adele Änggård
- Kathleen Ankers
- Madeleine Arbour
- Marta Becket
- Maria Björnson
- Madeleine Boyd
- Gladys Calthrop
- Marie Anne Chiment
- Millia Davenport
- Kirsten Dehlholm
- Victorina Durán
- Lauren Elder
- Heidi Ettinger
- Soutra Gilmour
- Rachel Hauck
- Marjorie B. Kellogg
- Adrianne Lobel
- Anna Louizos
- Elaine J. McCarthy
- Elizabeth Montgomery
- Armande Oswald
- Natacha Rambova
- Kia Steave-Dickerson
- Karen TenEyck
- Donyale Werle

=== Multi-Media ===
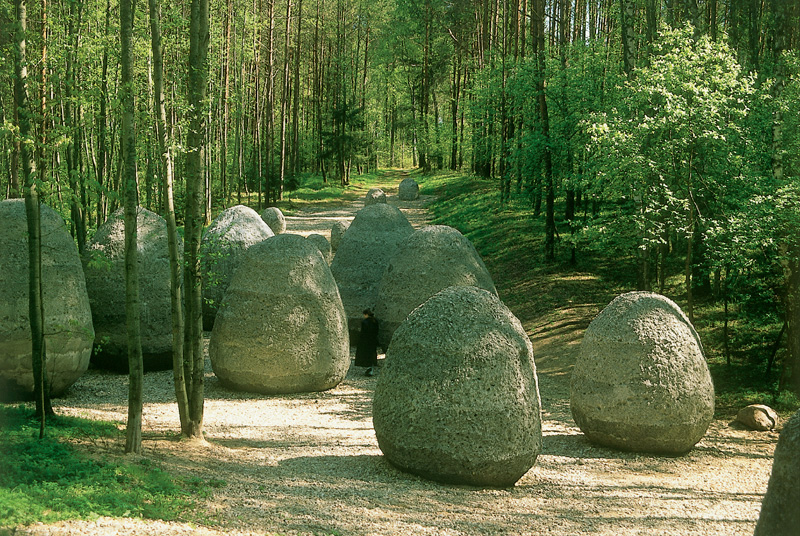
Magdalena Abakanowicz, Europos parkas, Lithuania

Mary Carroll Nelson founded the Society of Layerists in Multi-Media (SLMM), whose artist members follow in the tradition of Emil Bisttram and the Transcendental Painting Group, as well as Morris Graves of the Pacific Northwest Visionary Art School. In the 1970s, Judy Chicago created The Dinner Party, a very important work of feminist art. Helen Frankenthaler was an Abstract Expressionist painter and she was influenced by Jackson Pollock. Lee Krasner was also an Abstract Expressionist artist and married to Pollock and a student of Hans Hofmann. Elaine de Kooning was a student and later the wife of Willem de Kooning, she was an abstract figurative painter. Anne Ryan was a collagist. Jane Frank, also a student of Hans Hofmann, worked with mixed media on canvas. In Canada, Marcelle Ferron was an exponent of automatism.

From the 1960s on, feminism led to a great increase in interest in women artists and their academic study. Notable contributions have been made by the art historians Germaine Greer, Linda Nochlin, Griselda Pollock, curator Jasia Reichardt and others. Some art historians such as Daphne Haldin have attempted to redress the balance of male-focused histories by compiling lists of women artists, though many of these efforts remain unpublished. Figures like Artemisia Gentileschi and Frida Kahlo emerged from relative obscurity to become feminist icons. The Guerilla Girls, an anonymous group of females formed in 1985, were "the conscience of the art world." They spoke out about indifference and inequalities for gender and race, particularly in the art world. The Guerilla Girls have made many posters as a way of bringing attention, typically in a humorous way, to the community to raise awareness and create change. In 1996, Catherine de Zegher curated an exhibition of 37 great women artists from the twentieth century. The exhibition, Inside the Visible, that travelled from the ICA in Boston to the National Museum for Women in the Arts in Washington, the Whitechapel in London and the Art Gallery of Western Australia in Perth, included artists' works from the 1930s through the 1990s featuring Claude Cahun, Louise Bourgeois, Bracha Ettinger, Agnes Martin, Carrie Mae Weems, Charlotte Salomon, Eva Hesse, Nancy Spero, Francesca Woodman, Lygia Clark, Mona Hatoum and the acclaimed Magdalena Abakanowicz who used textiles in her installations, among others.

=== Textiles ===
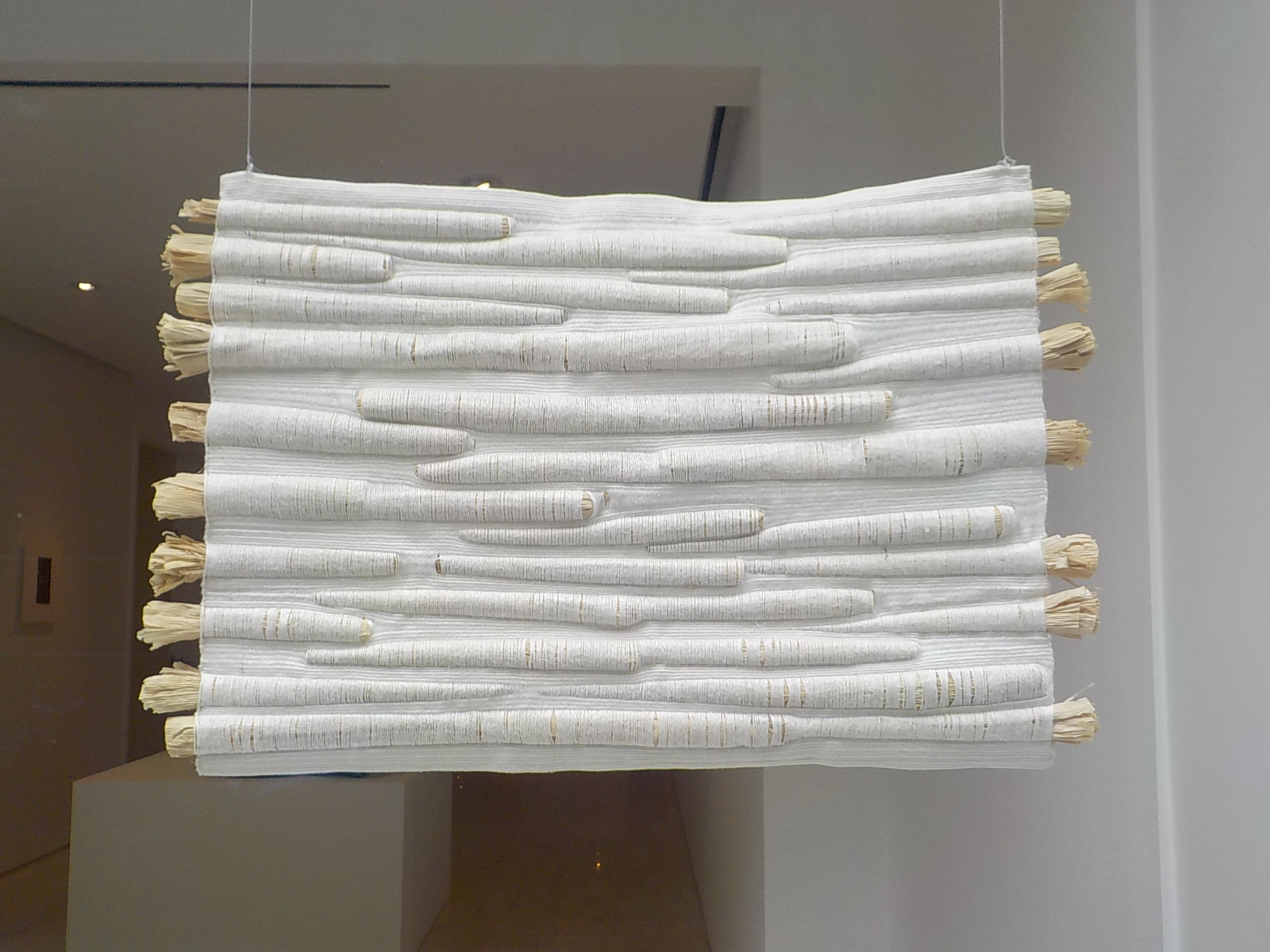
2019 exhibit at the Demisch Danant gallery, New York City by Sheila Hicks

Women's textiles were previously relegated to the private sphere and associated with domesticity rather than being recognised as art. There was previously a requirement of art to demonstrate 'artist-genius' which was associated with masculinity; where textiles was seen as functional it was not considered art. This led to women avoiding techniques which were associated with femininity, from textiles to the use of delicate lines or certain 'feminine' colours because they did not want to be called feminine artists. However, in more recent years this has been challenged and textiles has been used to create art which is representative of female experiences and struggles. Parker's 'The Subversive Stitch' demonstrates feminists subverting embroidery to make feminist statements and challenge the idea that textiles should only be associate with domesticity and femininity. Michna finds that challenging artistic practices which exclude women exposes the politics and gender bias of traditional art and helps to breakdown class-based and patriarchal divisions. These traditionally female forms of expression are now used to empower women; develop knowledge and reclaim traditional women's skills which society had previously devalued.

Also see Craftivism.

=== Ceramics ===
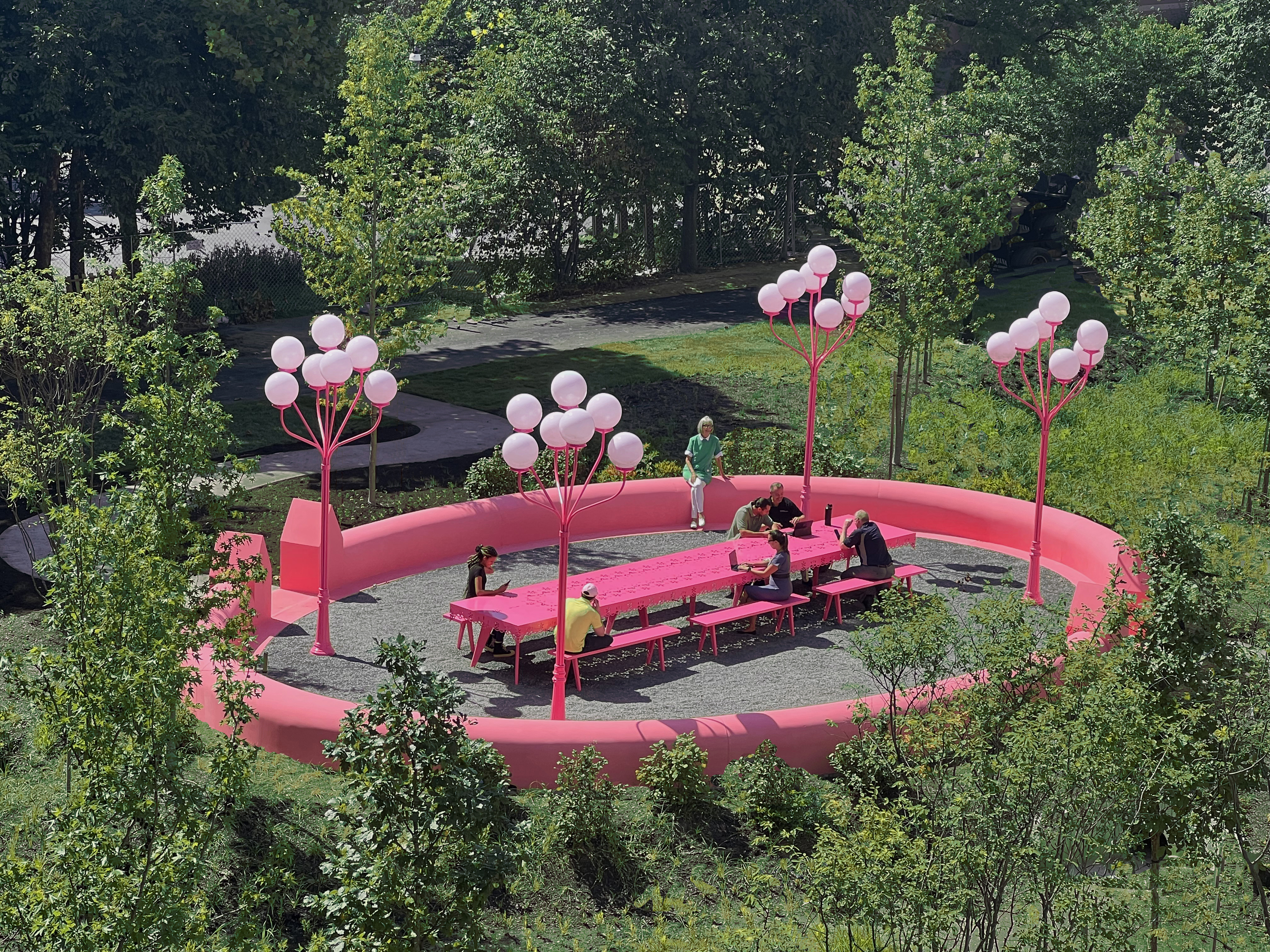
"The Home We Share" art-works trio inaugurates a new understanding of architecture as public art and a conception of outdoor art as social sculptures.

The re-emergence in the late 19th-century of the creation of ceramic art objects in Japan and Europe has become known as Studio pottery, although it encompasses sculpture and also tesserae, the mosaic cubes which go back to Persia in the third millennium BCE. Several influences contributed to the emergence of studio pottery: art pottery in the work of the Martin Brothers and William Moorcroft, the Arts and Crafts movement, the Bauhaus and the rediscovery of traditional artisan pottery and the excavation of large quantities of Song pottery in China.

Leading trends in British studio pottery in the 20th century are represented by both men and women: Bernard Leach, William Staite Murray, Dora Billington, Lucie Rie and Hans Coper. Leach (1887–1979) established a style of pottery, the ethical pot, strongly influenced by Chinese, Korean, Japanese and medieval English forms. His style dominated British studio pottery in the mid-20th century. Leach's influence was disseminated in particular by his A Potter's Book and the apprentice system he ran at his pottery in St Ives, Cornwall.

Other ceramic artists exerted an influence through their positions in art schools. Dora Billington (1890–1968) studied at Hanley School of Art, worked in the pottery industry and became head of pottery at the Central School of Arts and Crafts. She worked in media that Leach did not, e.g. tin-glazed earthenware, and influenced potters such as William Newland, Katherine Pleydell-Bouverie and Margaret Hine.

Since the 1960s, a new generation of potters, influenced by the Camberwell School of Art and the Central School of Art and Design including, Alison Britton, Ruth Duckworth and Elizabeth Fritsch who began to experiment\abstract ceramic objects, varied surface and glaze effects to critical acclaim. Elizabeth Fritsch has work represented in major collections and museums worldwide. Moreover, the reputation of British ceramicists has attracted talent from around the world and released notable artists in the field. They include: Indian Nirmala Patwardhan, Kenyan, Magdalene Odundo and Iranian, Homa Vafaie Farley.

As in Britain, pottery was integral to the United States Arts and Crafts movement in the late 19th century and early 20th century. Charles Fergus Binns, who was the first director of the New York State School of Clay-Working and Ceramics at Alfred University, was an important influence. Some potters in the United States adopted the approach from emerging studio pottery movements in Britain and Japan. Worldwide and European artists coming to the United States have contributed to the public appreciation of ceramics as art, and included Marguerite Wildenhain, Maija Grotell, Susi Singer and Gertrude and Otto Natzler. Significant studio potters in the United States include Otto and Vivika Heino, Beatrice Wood and Amber Aguirre.

Meanwhile, in the reducing primeval forests of the African Great Lakes region in the Rift Valley, there is a people clinging to their foraging ancestral way of life. They are the Batwa, among the most marginalised people in the world, whose womenfolk (and the occasional man) continue the centuries-old custom of making pottery which has been used as barter with the peasants and pastoralists of the region. Their pots range from plain to highly decorated.

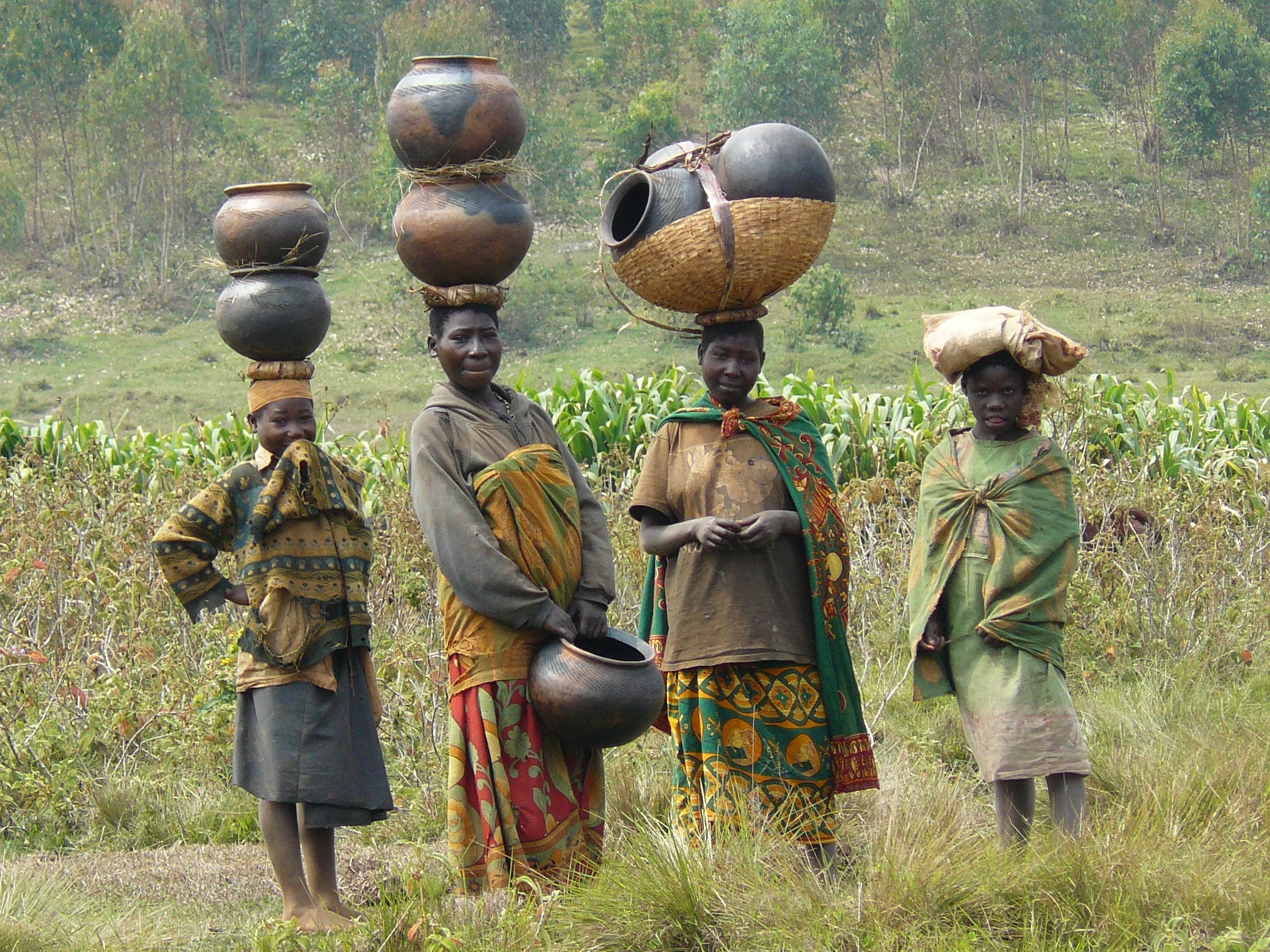
Batwa women with traditional pottery

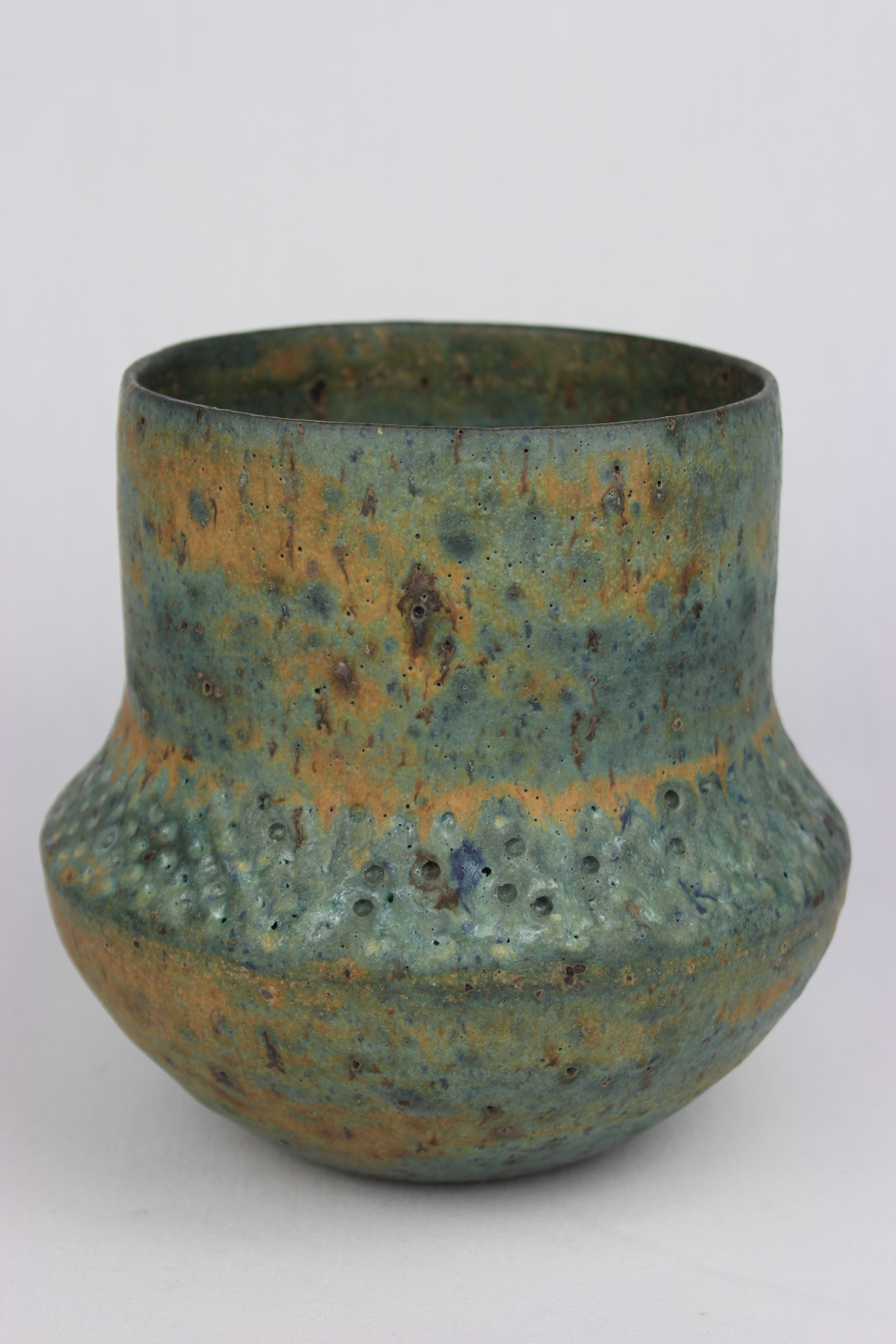
Vase thrown by Lucie Rie

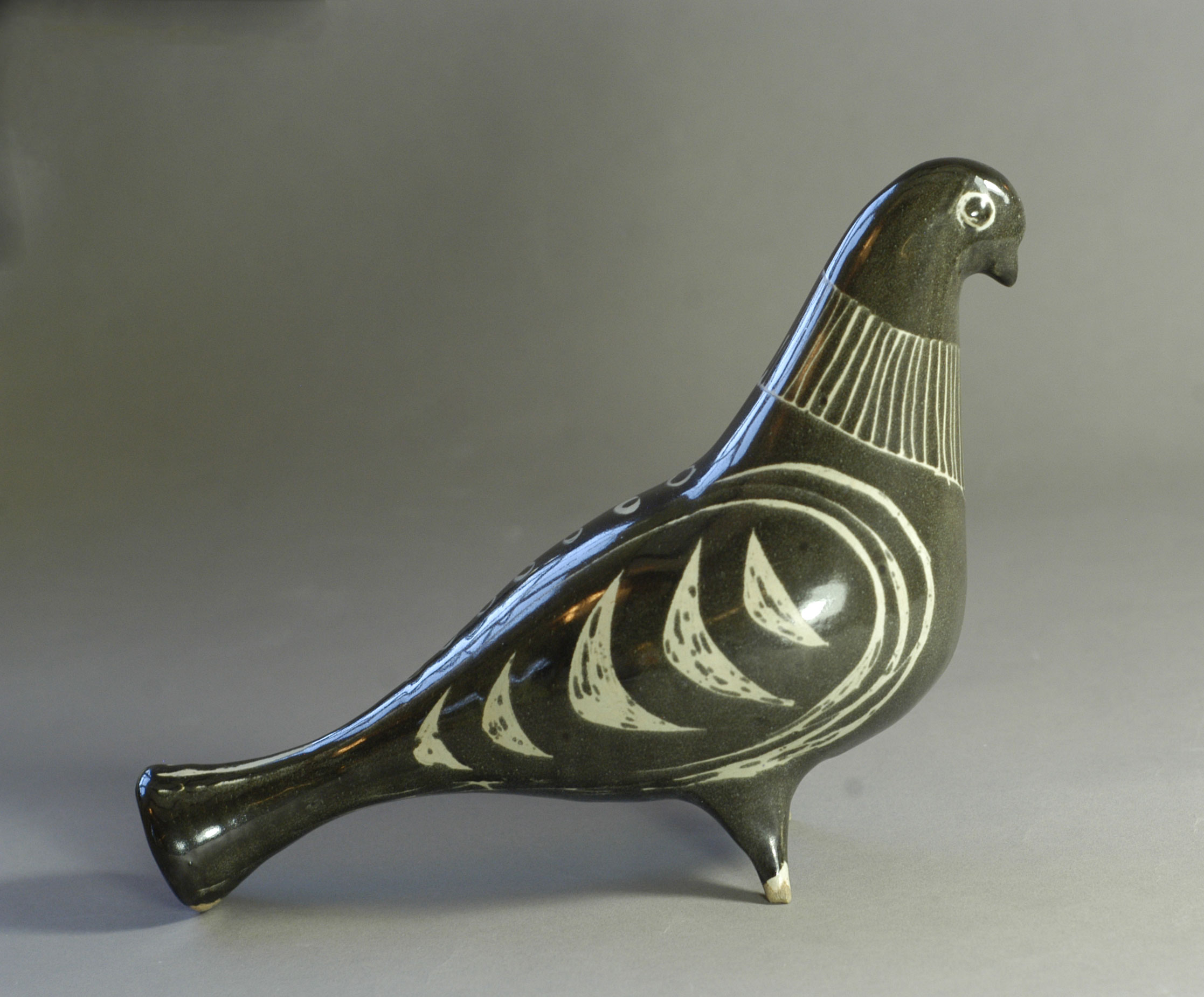
Ceramic bird by Margaret Hine, 1950s. Glazed stoneware with sgraffito decoration.

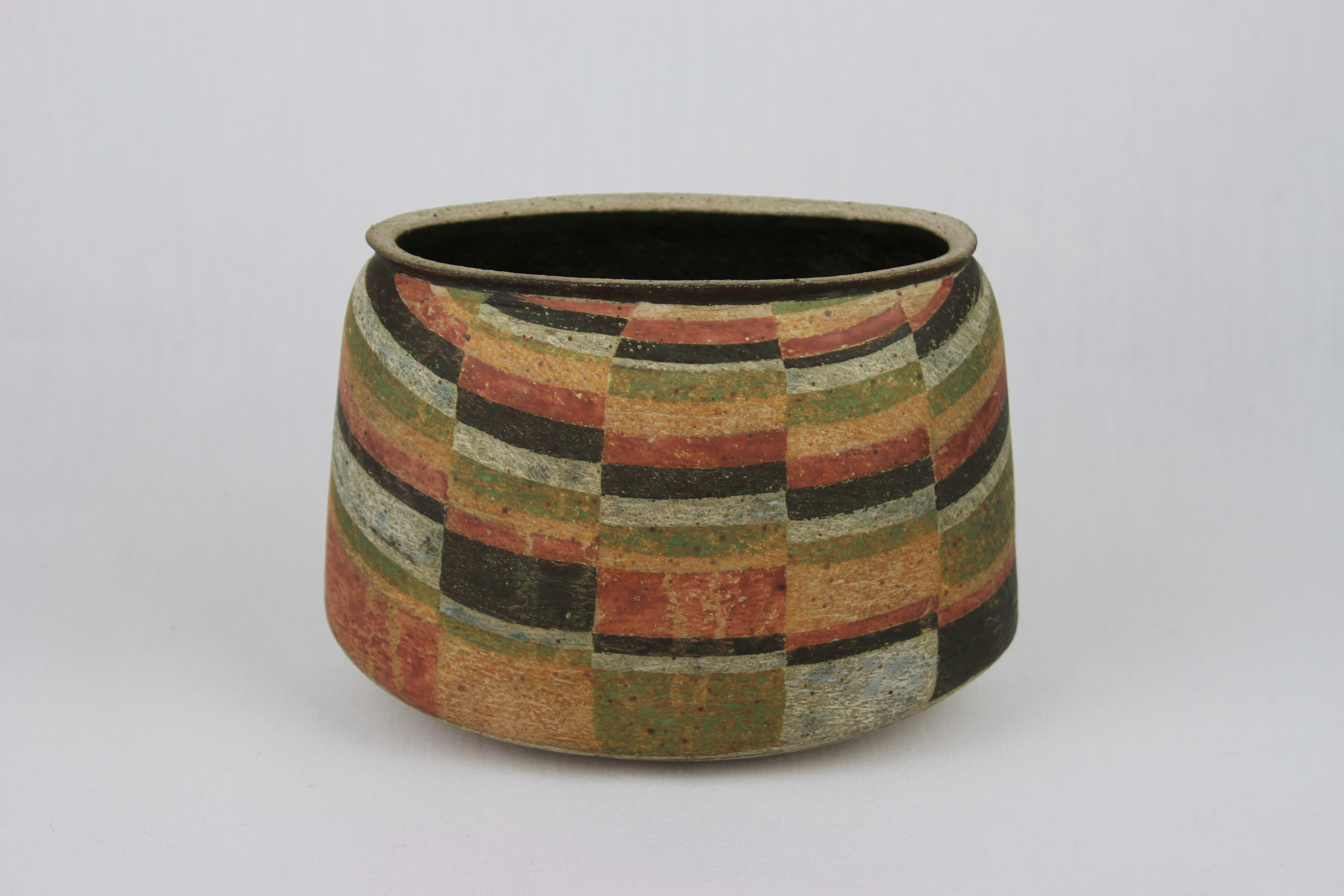
Hand-Built pot by Elizabeth Fritsch

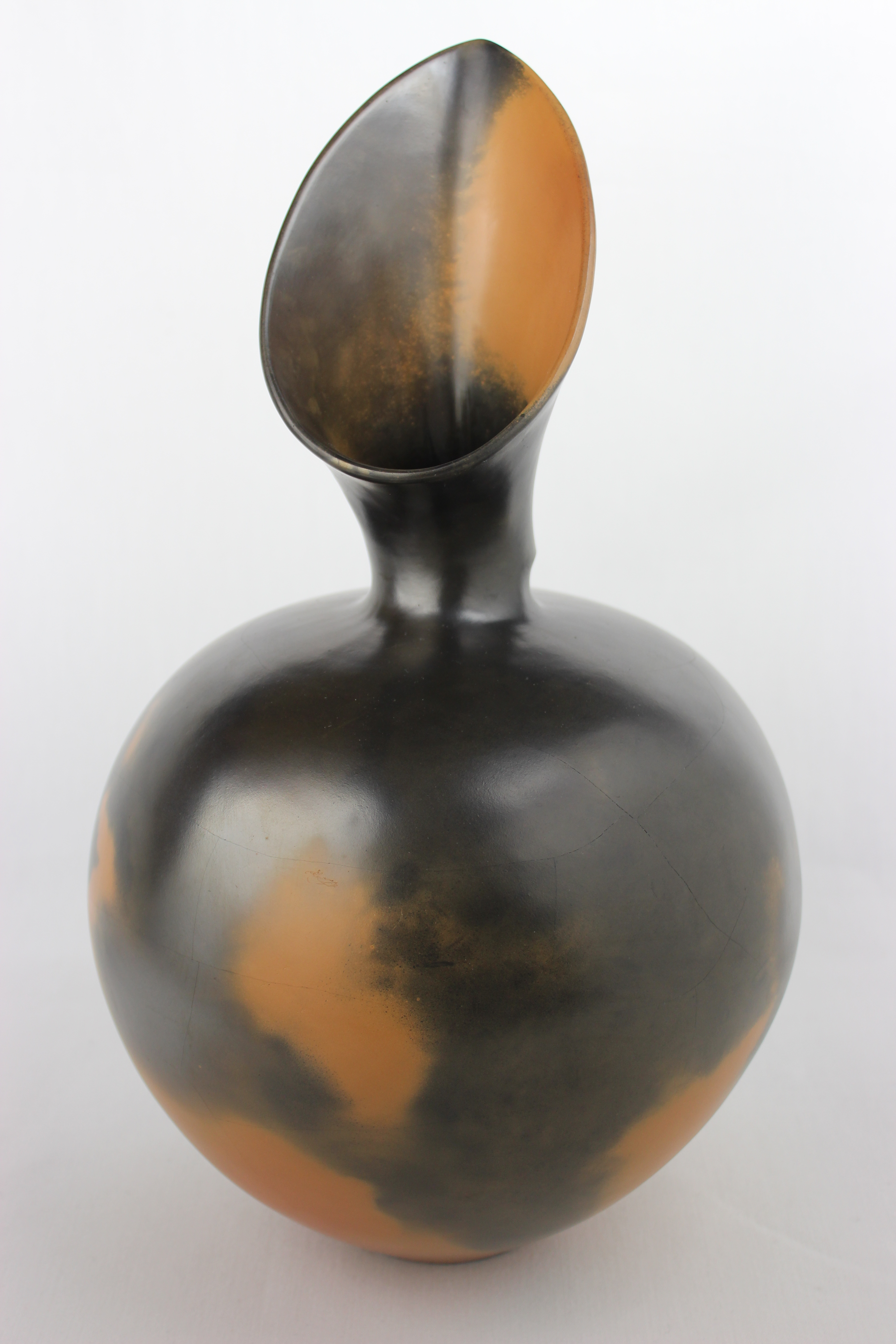
Magdalene Odundo's thrown burnished pot

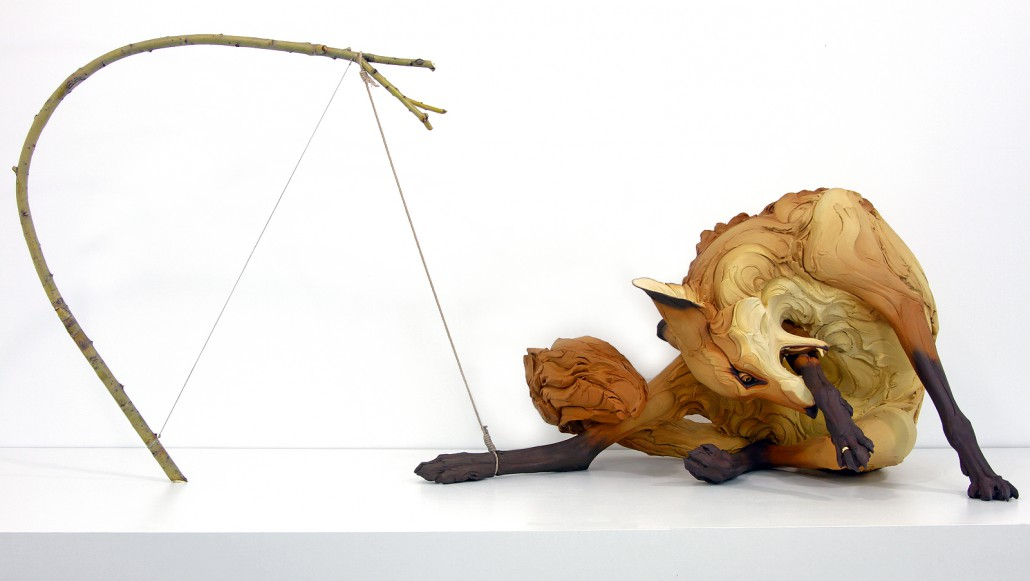
Title: "Trapped" Year: 2015 by Beth Cavener Stichter

== Contemporary artists ==
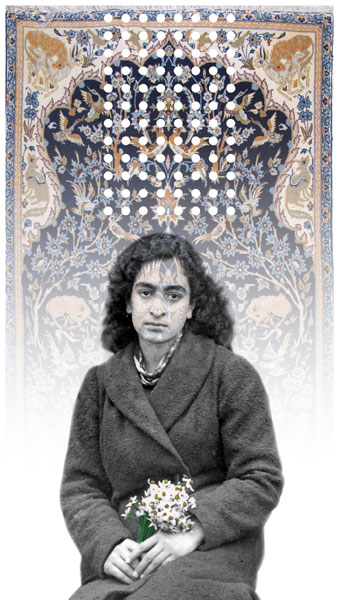
Samira Alikhanzadeh, No.7 the Persian Carpet series-digital print on perspex, Borchalou rug and mirror fragments on board, 2011 (Assar Art Gallery) Tehran

In 1993, Rachel Whiteread was the first woman to win the Tate Gallery's Turner Prize. Gillian Wearing won the prize in 1997, when there was an all-woman shortlist, the other nominees being Christine Borland, Angela Bulloch and Cornelia Parker. In 1999, Tracey Emin gained considerable media coverage for her entry My Bed, but did not win. In 2006 the prize was awarded to abstract painter, Tomma Abts. In 2001, a conference called "Women Artists at the Millennium" was organized at Princeton University. A book by that name was published in 2006, featuring major art historians such as Linda Nochlin analysing prominent women artists such as Louise Bourgeois, Yvonne Rainer, Bracha Ettinger, Sally Mann, Eva Hesse, Rachel Whiteread and Rosemarie Trockel. Internationally prominent contemporary artists who are women also include Magdalena Abakanowicz, Marina Abramović, Grimanesa Amorós, Jaroslava Brychtova, Lynda Benglis, Lee Bul, Sophie Calle, Janet Cardiff, Li Chevalier, Marlene Dumas, Orshi Drozdik, Marisol Escobar, Bettina Heinen-Ayech, Jenny Holzer, Runa Islam, Chantal Joffe, Yayoi Kusama, Karen Kilimnik, Sarah Lucas, Neith Nevelson, Yoko Ono, Tanja Ostojić, Jenny Saville, Carolee Schneeman, Cindy Sherman, Chiharu Shiota, Shazia Sikander, Lorna Simpson, Lisa Steele, Stella Vine, Kara Walker, Rebecca Warren, Bettina Werner and Susan Dorothea White.

Japanese artist Yayoi Kusama's paintings, collages, soft sculptures, performance art and environmental installations all share an obsession with repetition, pattern, and accumulation. Her work shows some attributes of feminism, minimalism, surrealism, Art Brut, pop art, and abstract expressionism, and is infused with autobiographical, psychological, and sexual content. She describes herself as an "obsessive artist". In November 2008, Christie's auction house New York sold her 1959 painting No. 2 for $5,100,000, the record price in 2008 for a work by a living female artist.

During 2010–2011, Pompidou Centre in Paris presented its curators' choice of contemporary women artists in a three-volume's exhibition named elles@Centrepompidou. The museum showed works of major women artists from its own collection. 2010 saw Eileen Cooper elected as the first ever woman 'Keeper of the Royal Academy'. 1995 saw Dame Elizabeth Blackadder in the 300-year history made 'Her Majesty's painter and limber in Scotland, she was awarded the OBE in 1982.

Another genre of women's art is women's environmental art. As of December 2013, the Women Environmental Artists Directory listed 307 women environmental artists, such as Marina DeBris, Vernita Nemec and Betty Beaumont. DeBris uses beach trash to raise awareness of beach and ocean pollution. and to educate children about beach trash. Nemec recently used junk mail to demonstrate the complexity of modern life. Beaumont has been described as a pioneer of environmental art and uses art to challenge our beliefs and actions.

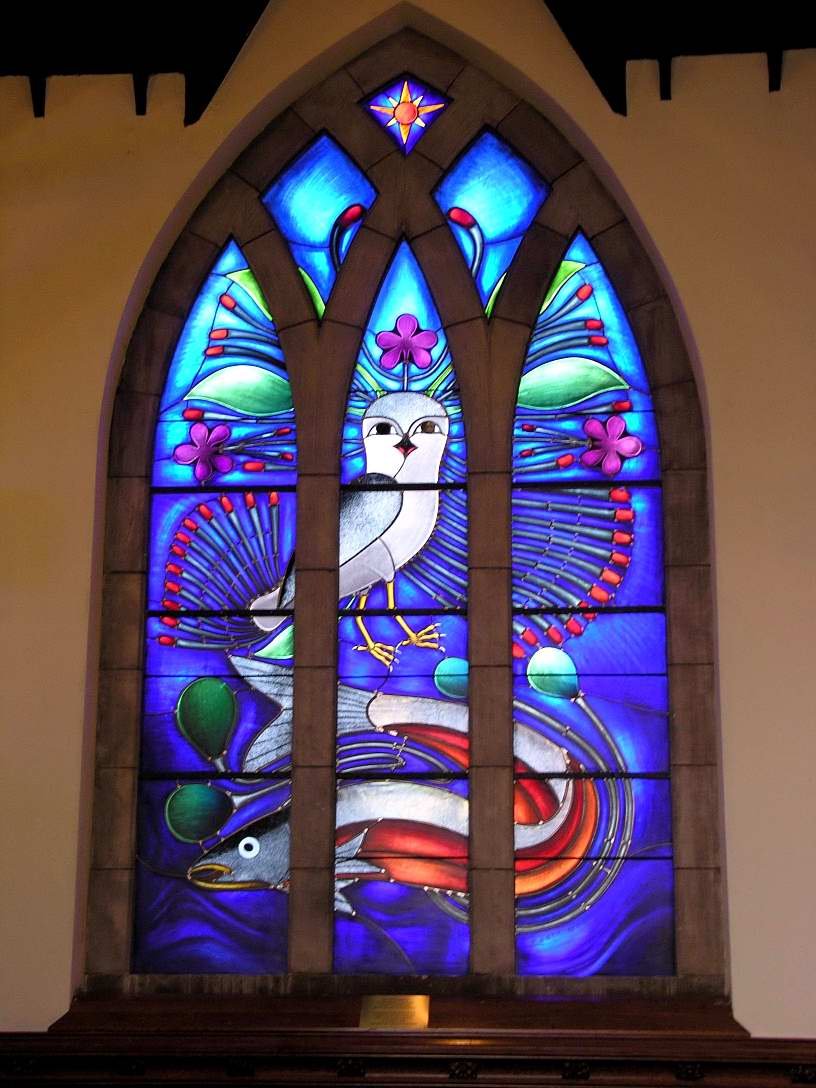
Kenojuak Ashevak Window of John Bell Chapel, 2004, Appleby College, Oakville, Canada

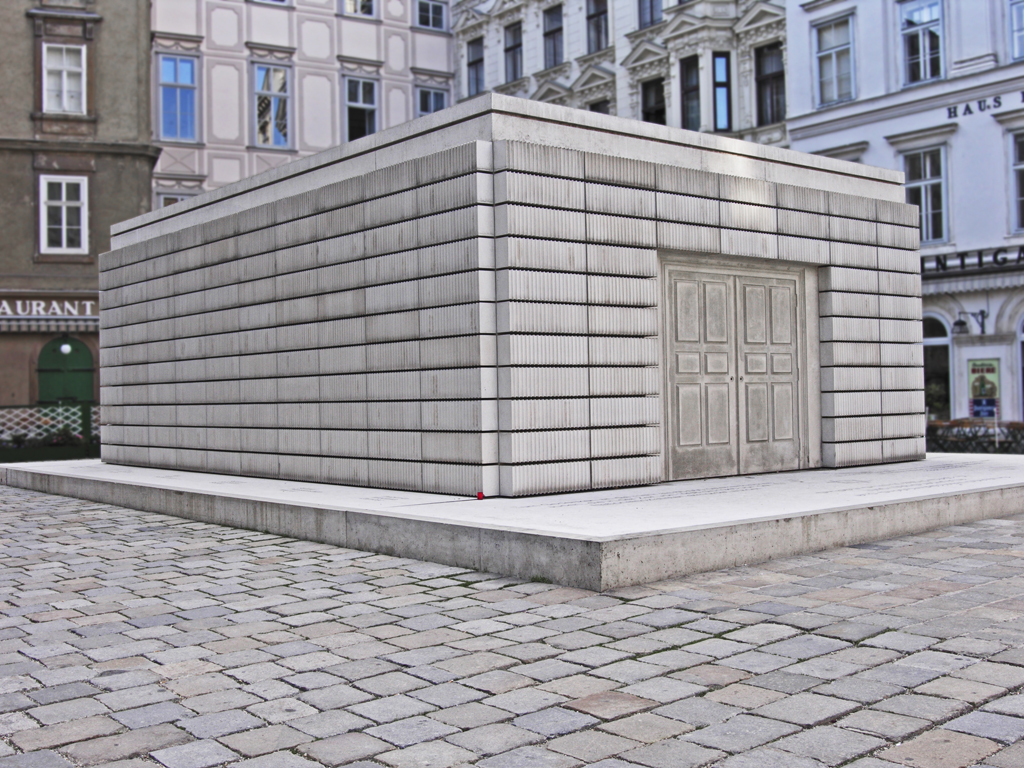
Rachel Whiteread, Holocaust Monument, 2000, Judenplatz, Vienna

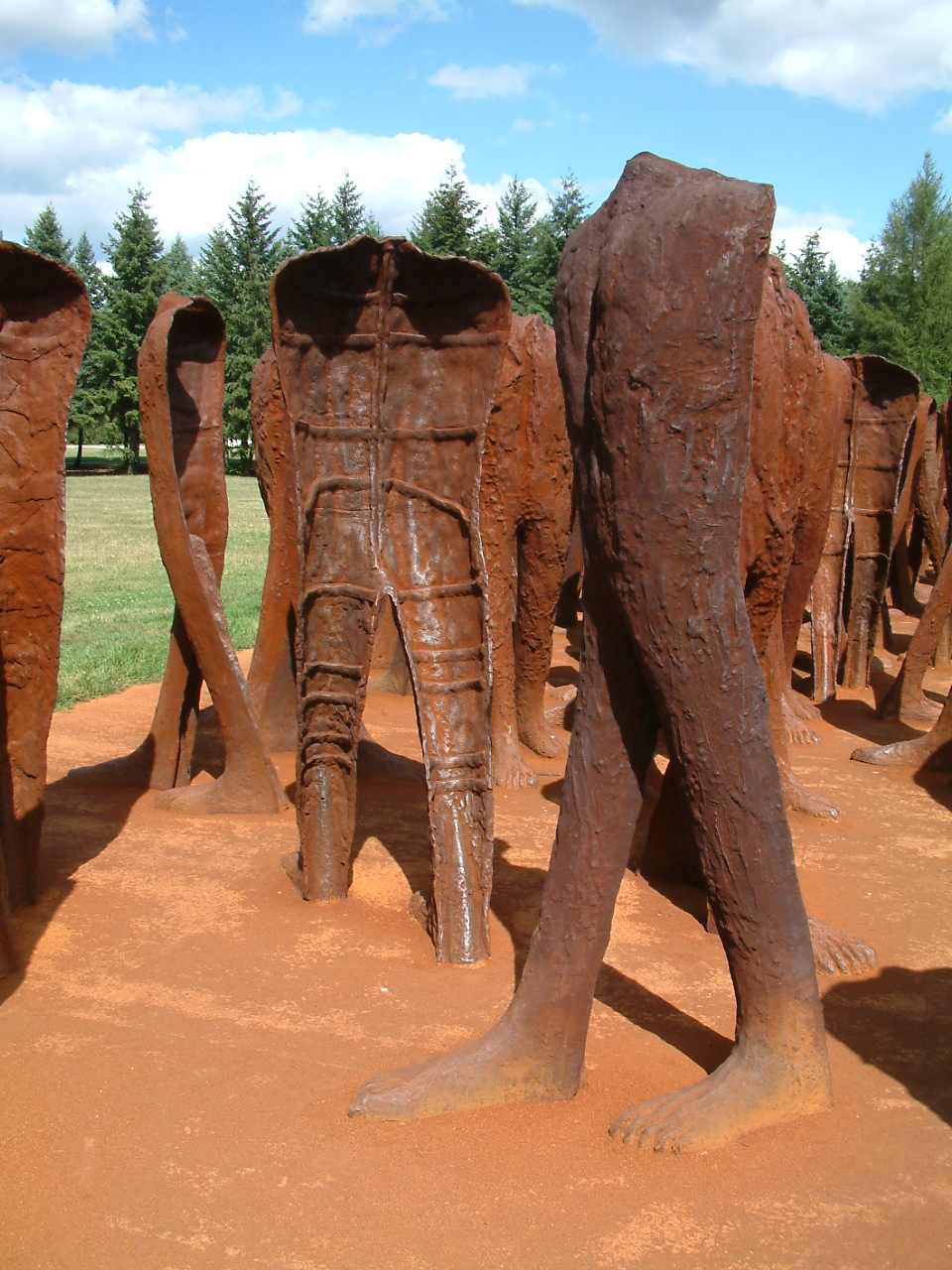
Magdalena Abakanowicz, Nierozpoznani ("The Unrecognised Ones"), 2002, in the Cytadela

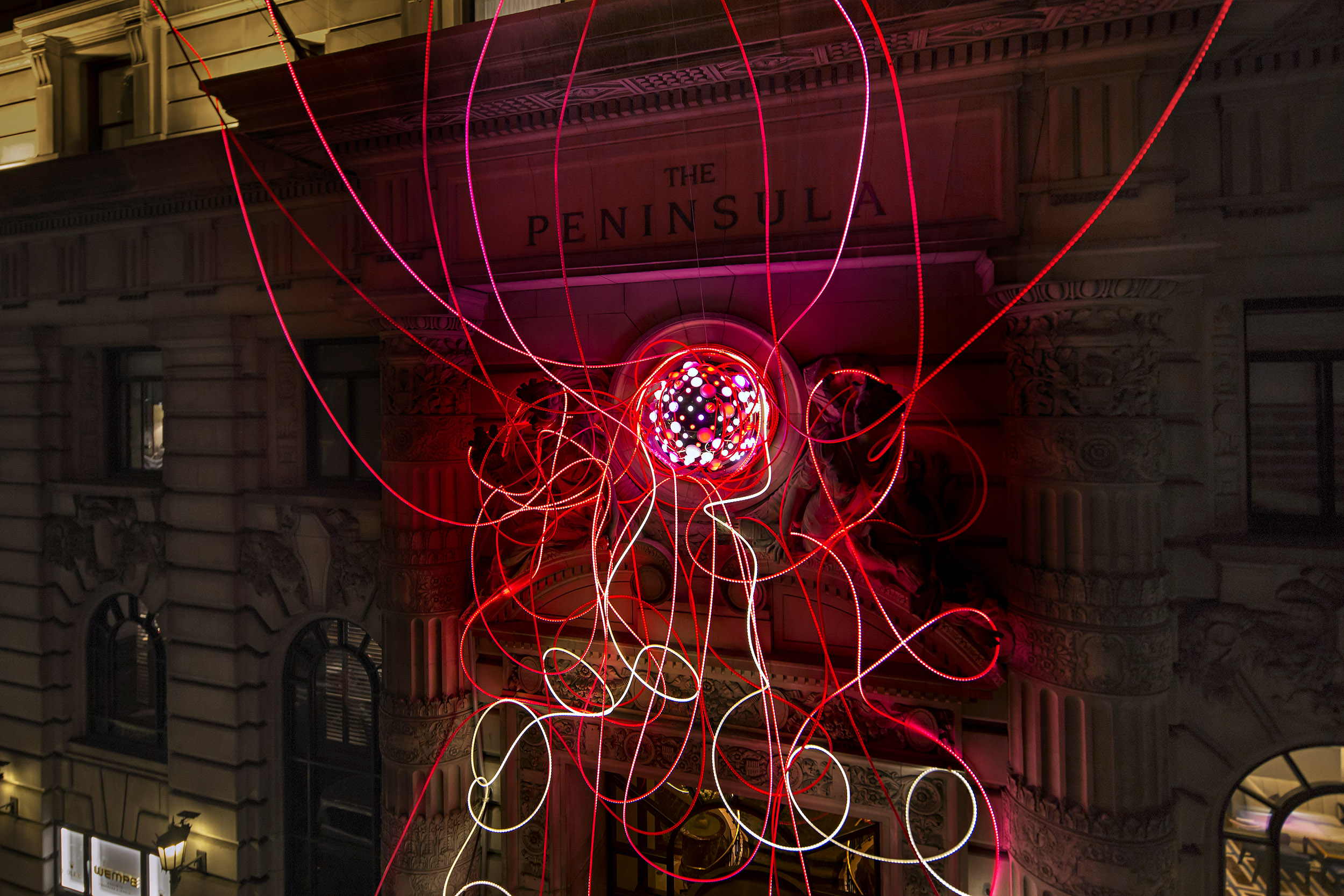
Grimanesa Amorós, Pink Lotus, 2015, atop the facade of the Peninsula New York

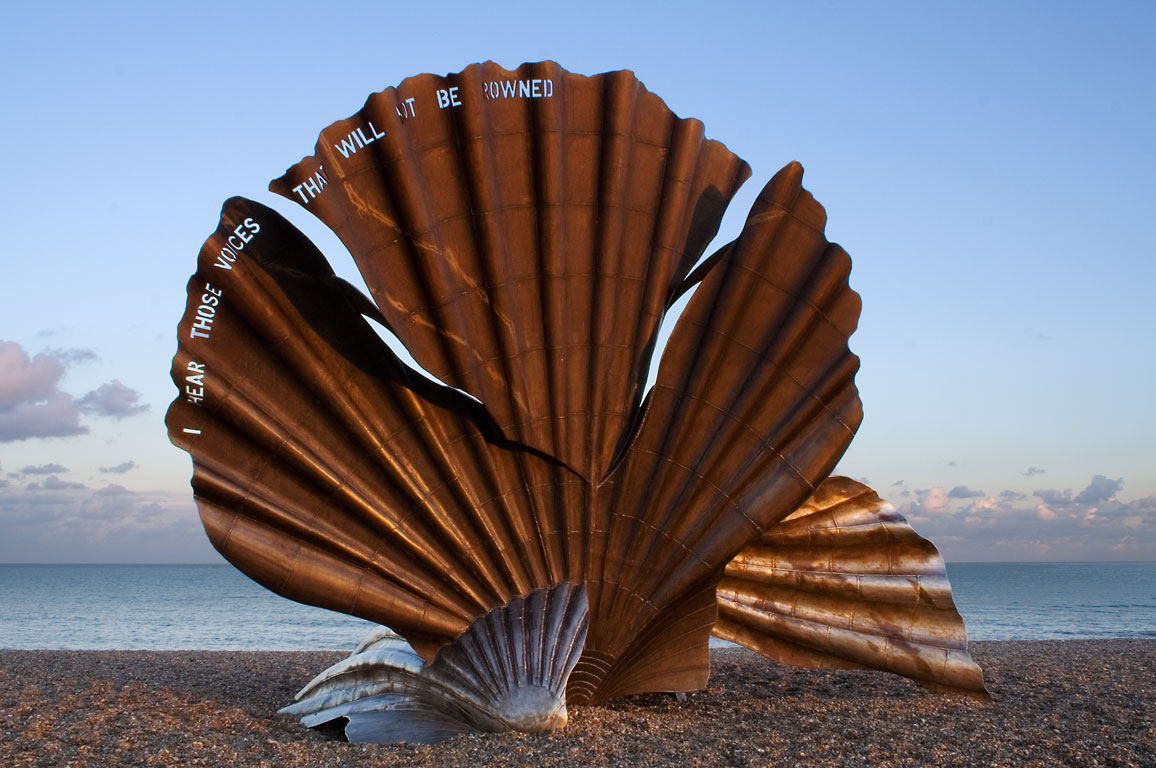
Hambling's Scallop 2003, tribute to Benjamin Britten, north end of Aldeburgh beach, England

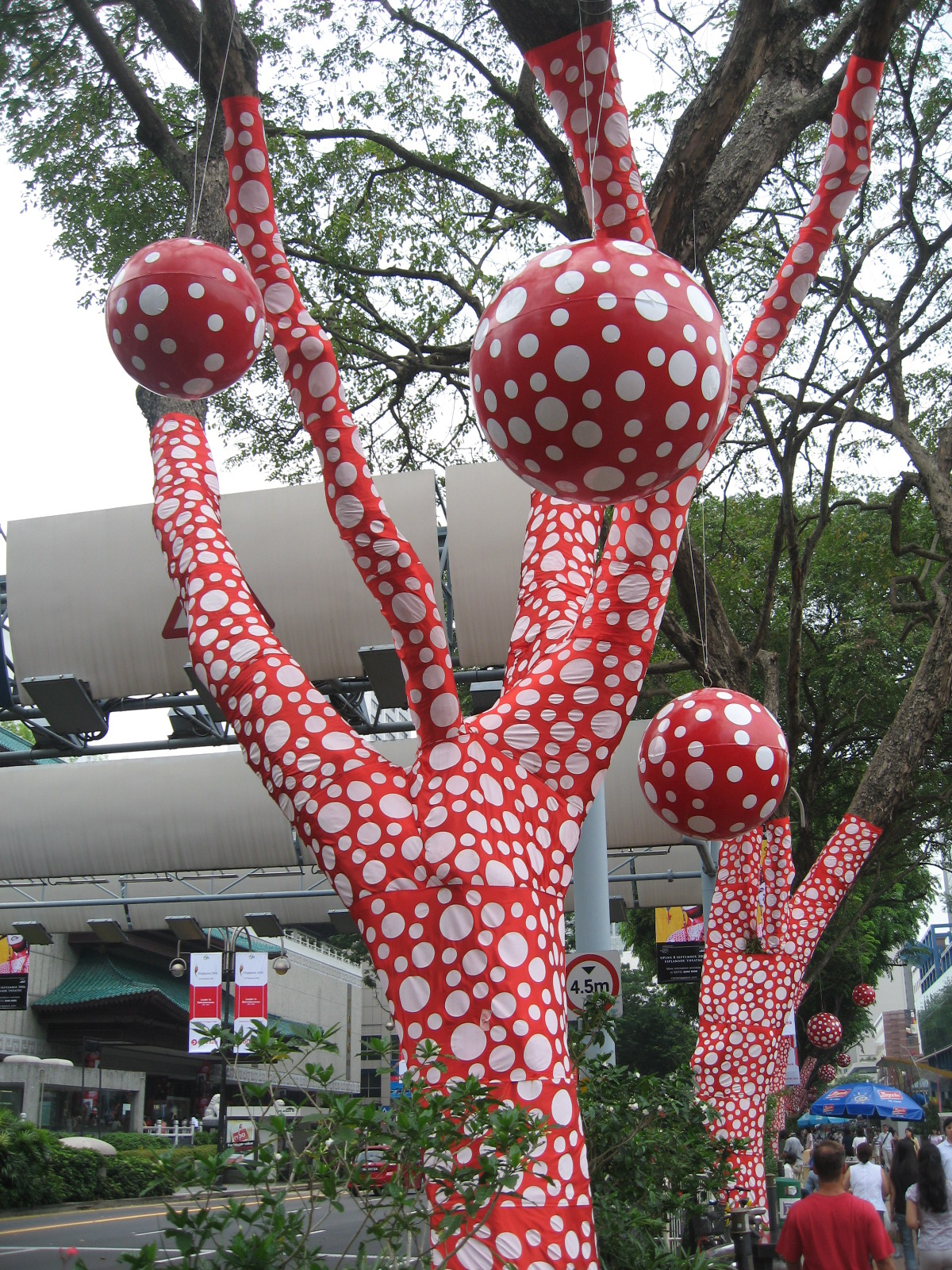
Yayoi Kusama, Ascension of Polkadots on the Trees at the Singapore Biennale, 2006

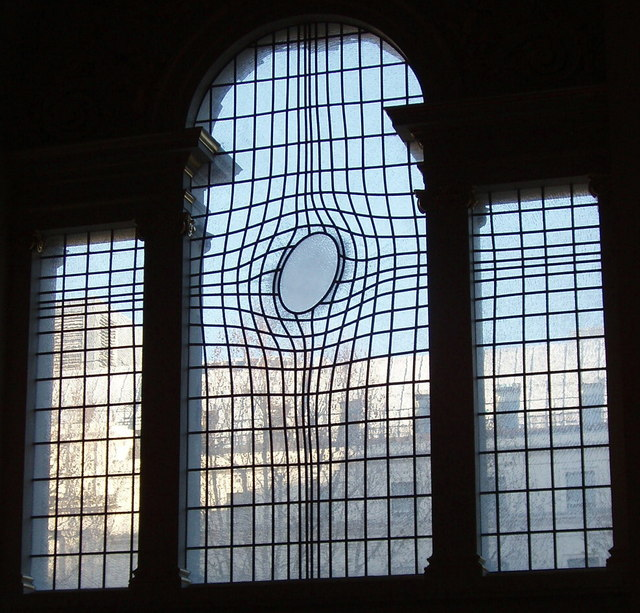
Shirazeh Houshiary, East window St Martin-in-the-Fields, London

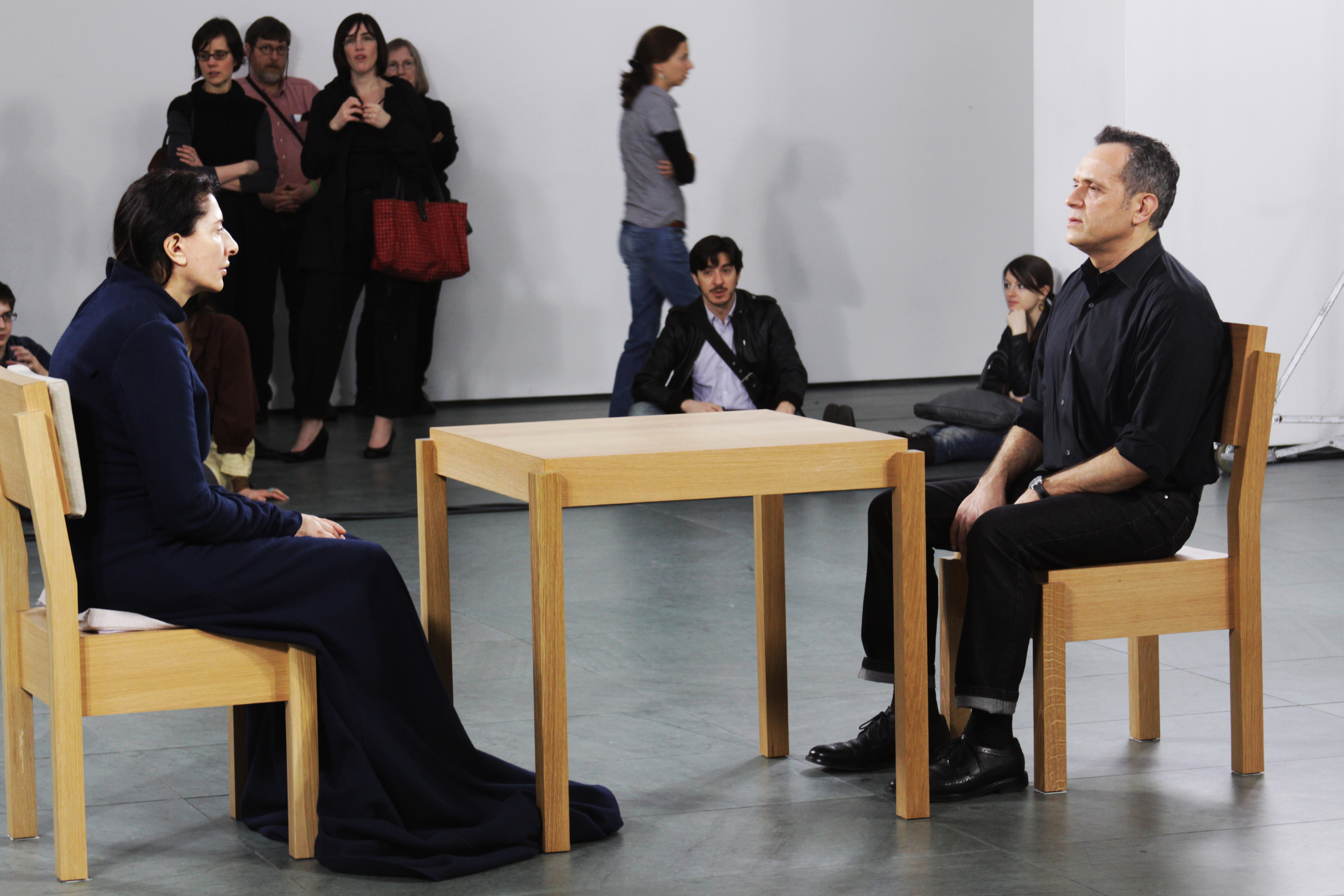
Marina Abramović performing in The Artist is Present at the Museum of Modern Art, May 2010

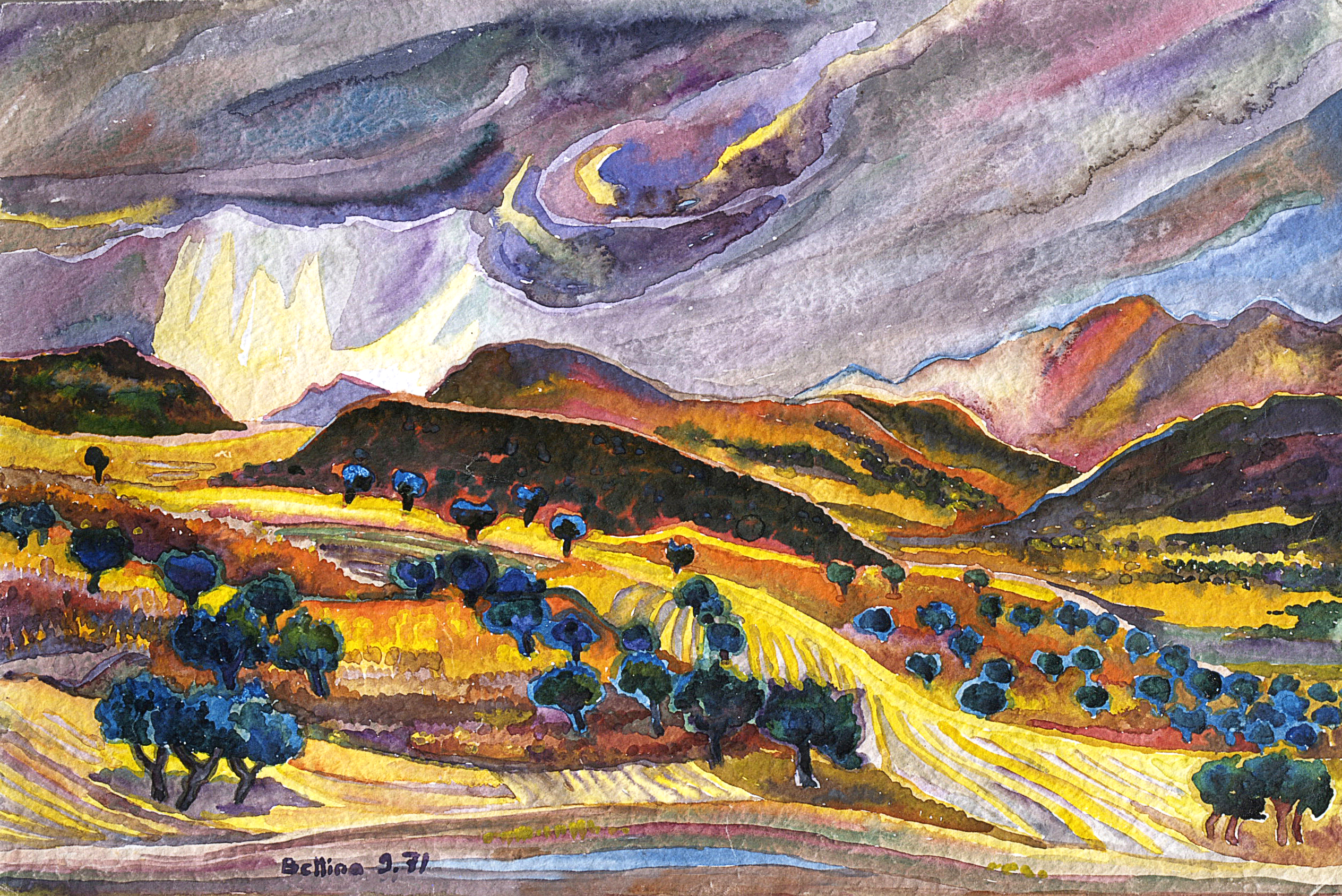
Bettina Heinen-Ayech (1937–2020): Summer thunderstorm in Algeria in 1974

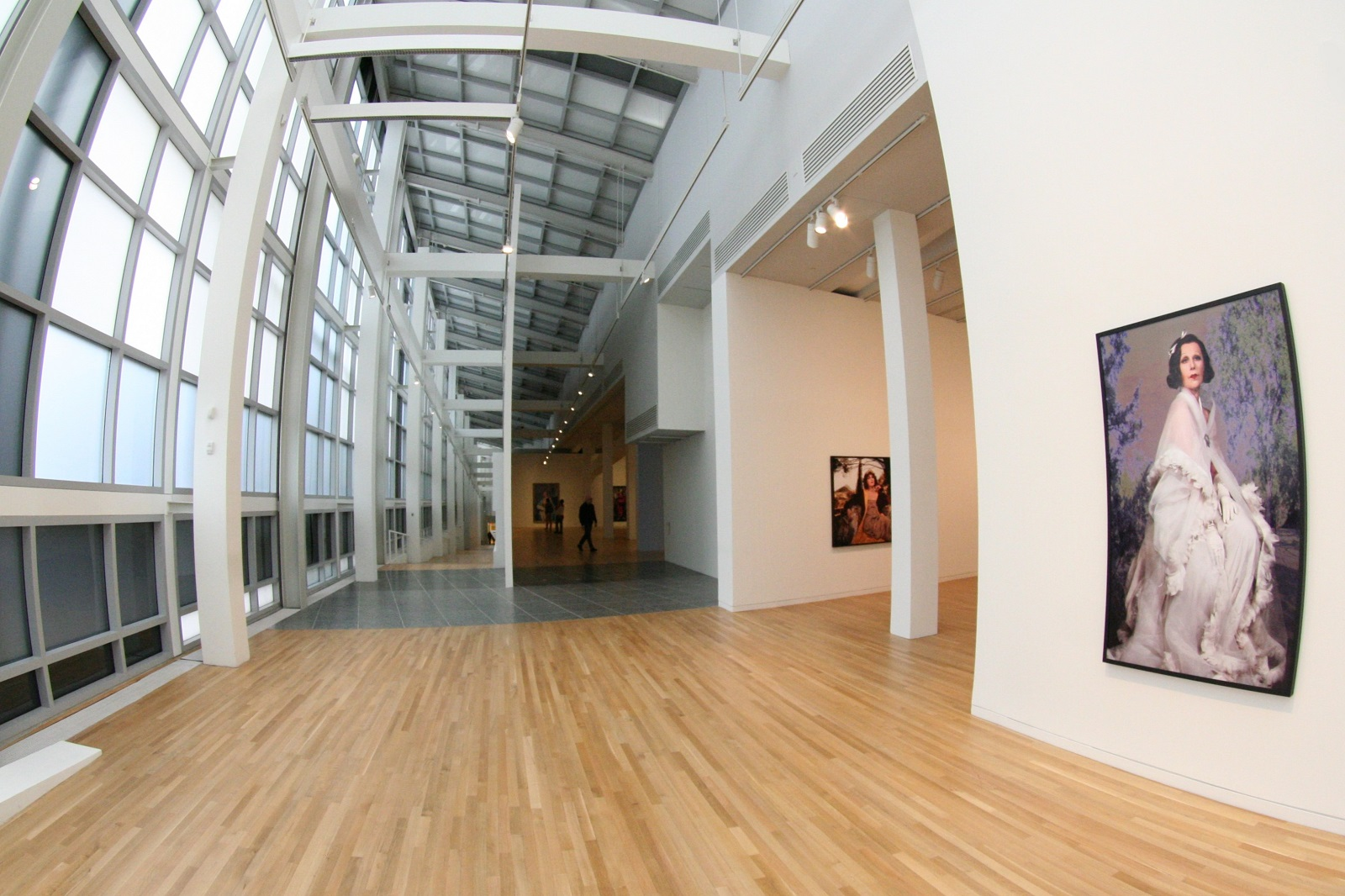
A work by Cindy Sherman displayed in the Wexner Center for the Arts

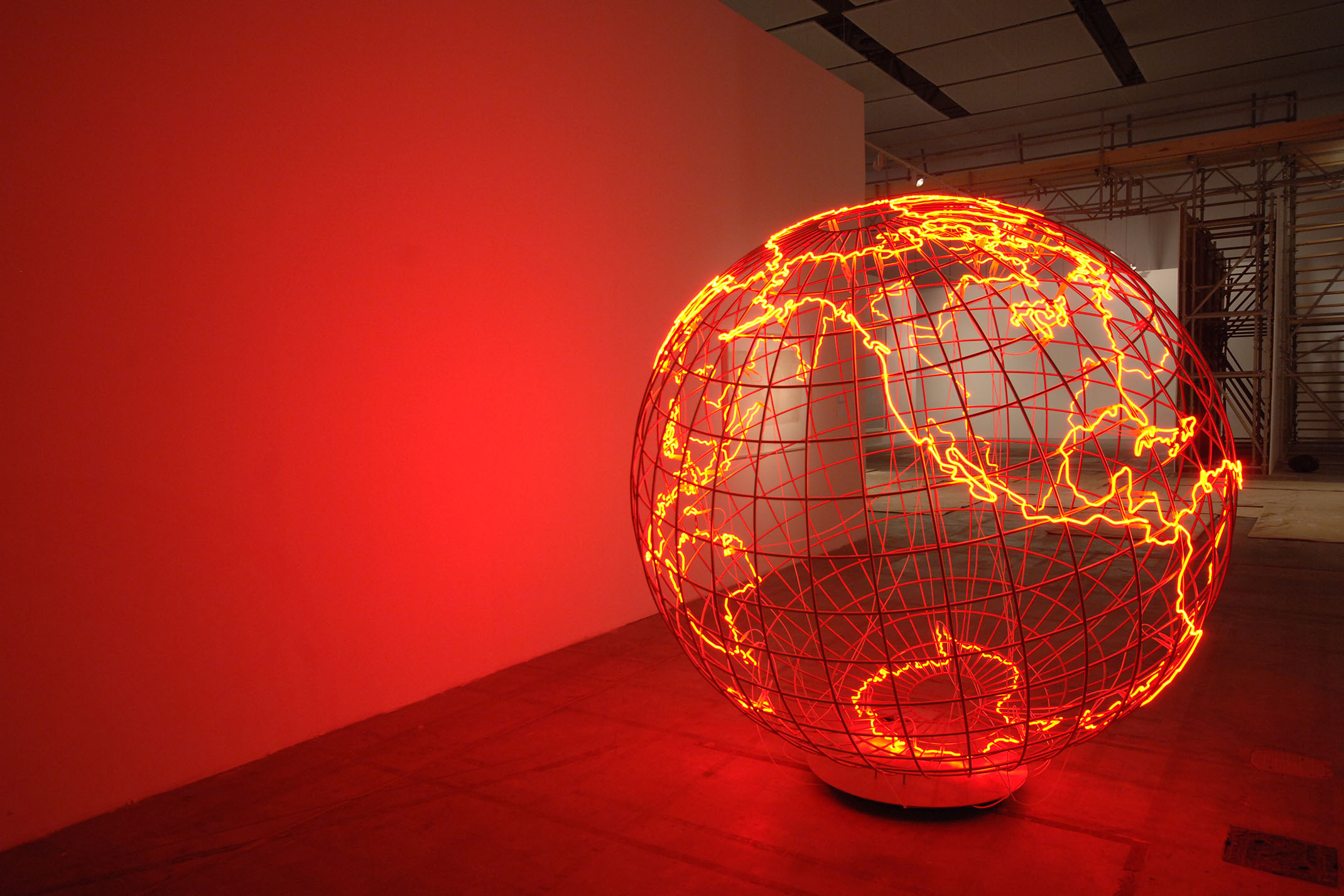
Hot Spot (2006) by Mona Hatoum

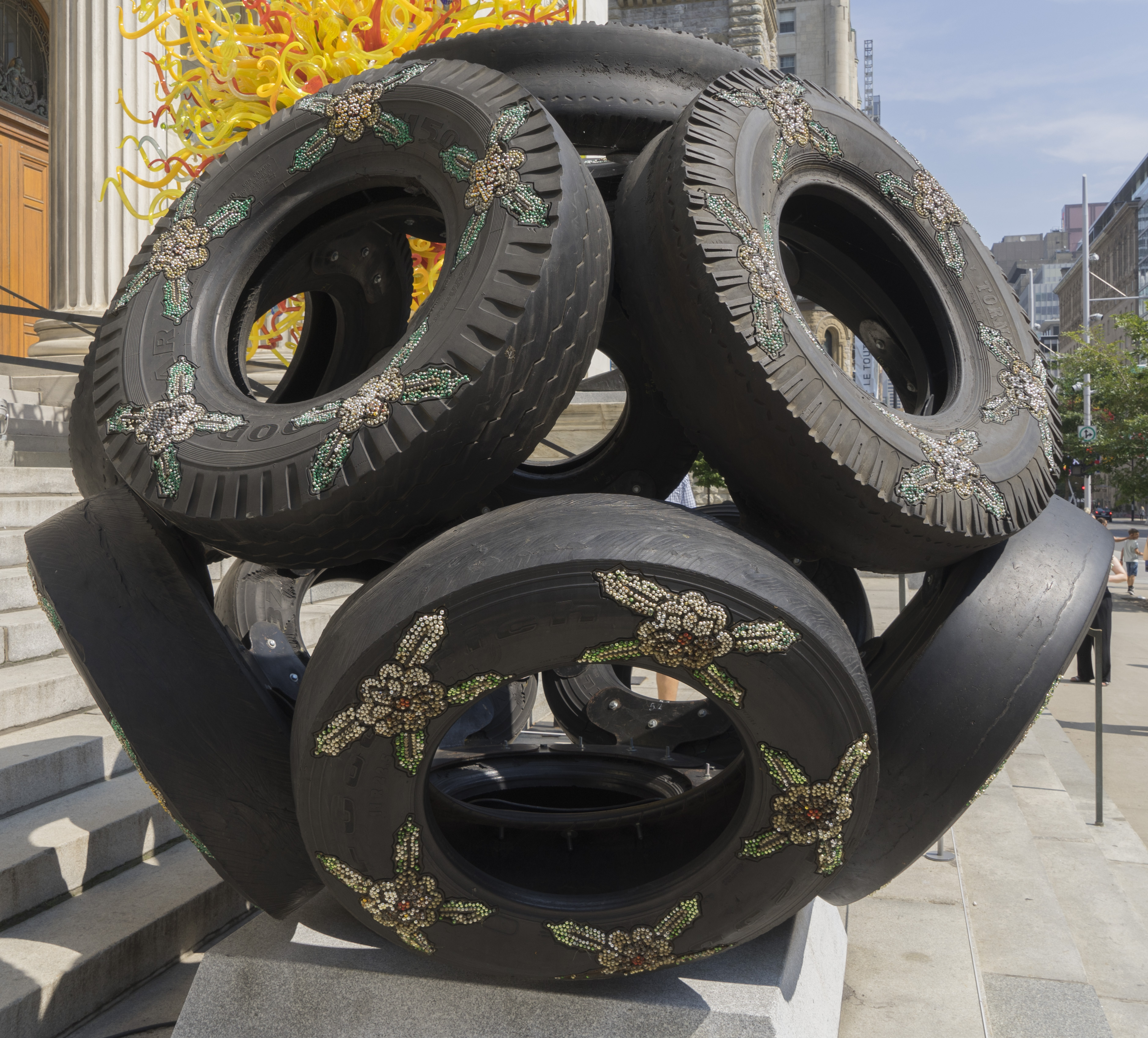
Tribute to Wirikuta, by Betsabeé Romero 2011, Montreal, Canada

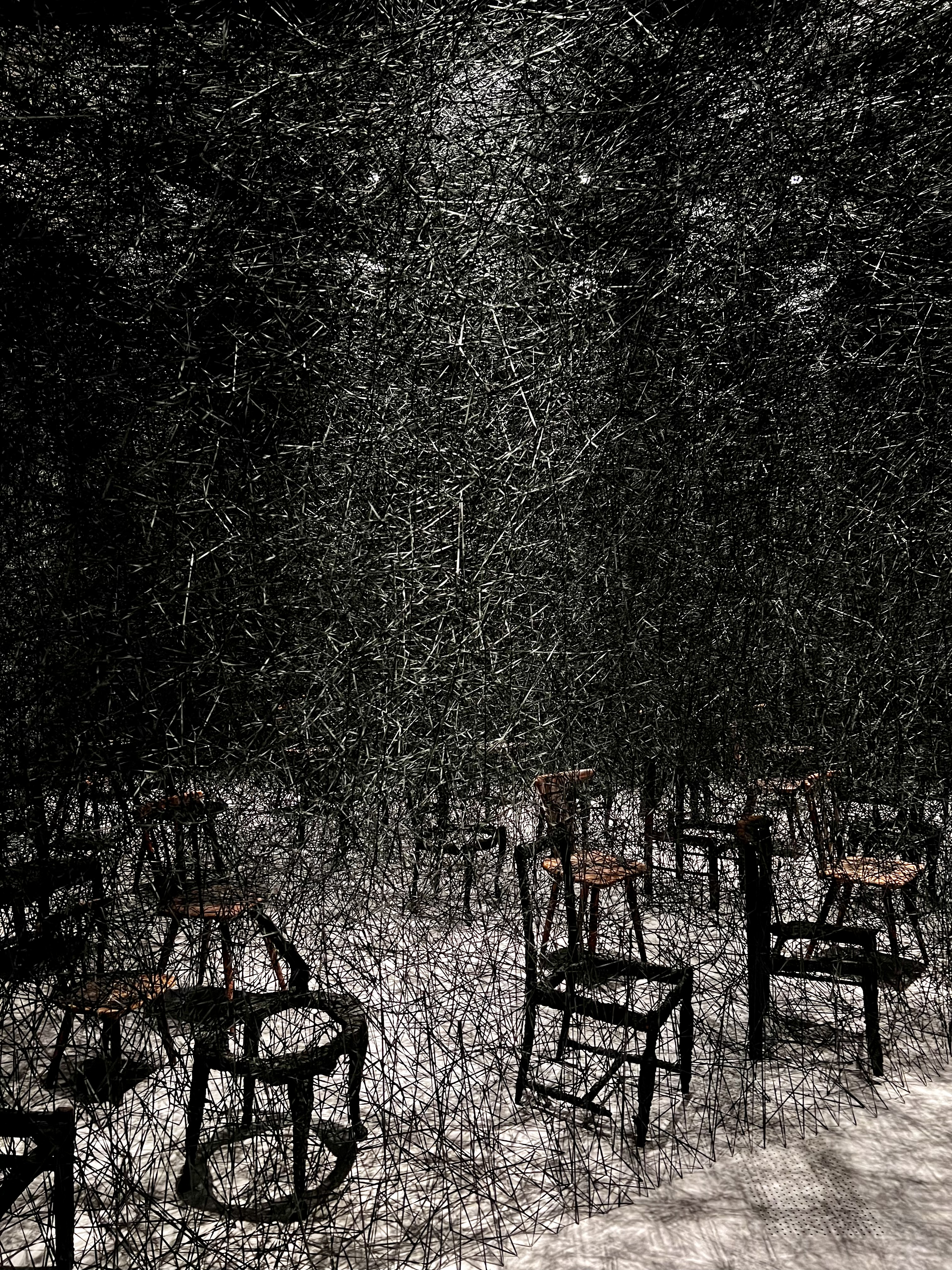
Chiharu Shiota’s The Soul Trembles exhibition QGOMA, 2022

== Misrepresentation in art history ==
Women artists have often been mis-characterized in historical accounts, both intentionally and unintentionally; such misrepresentations have often been dictated by the socio-political mores of the given era and the male domination of the art world. There are a number of issues that lie behind this, including:

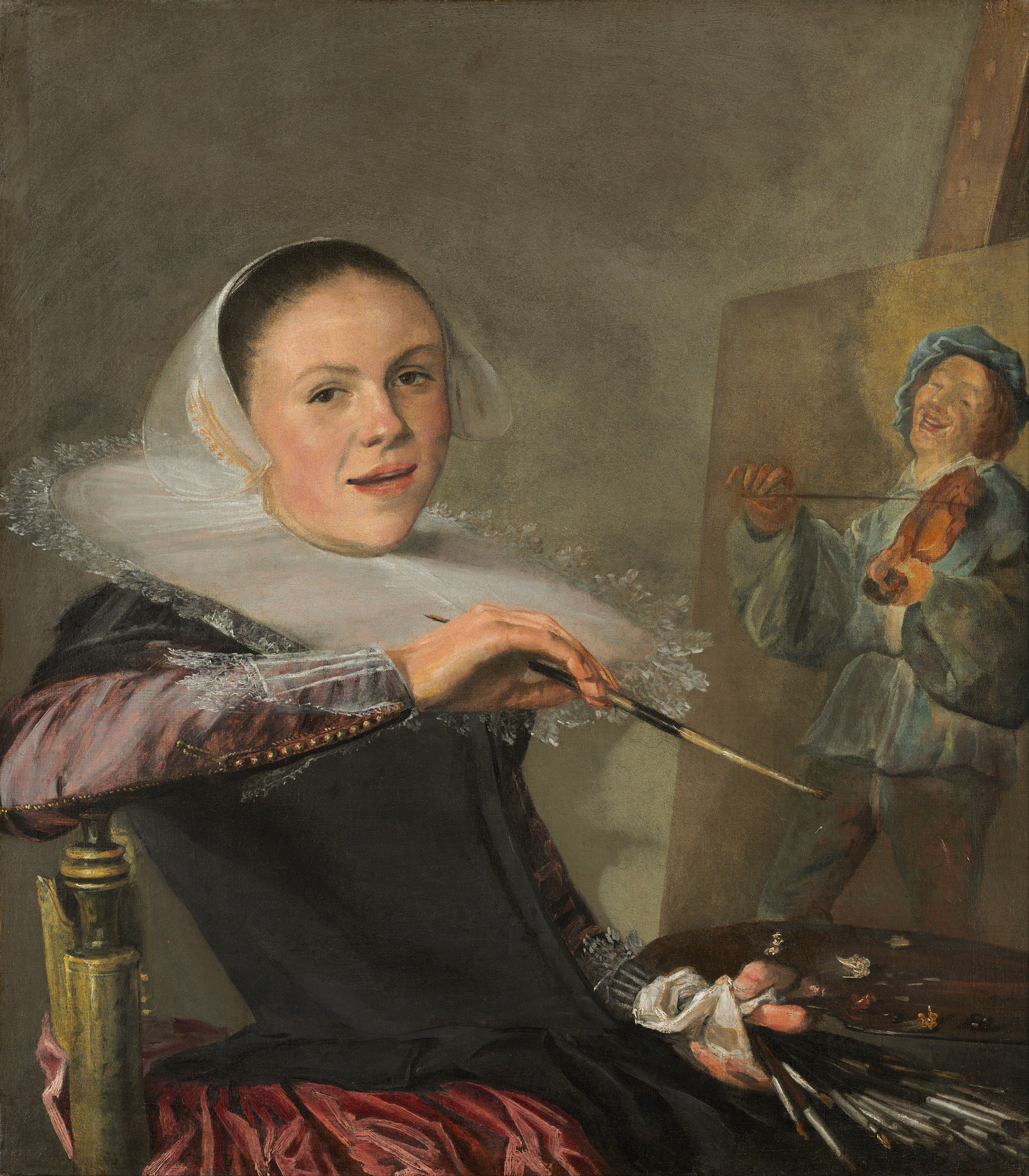
Judith Leyster's 1630 Self-portrait, National Gallery of Art, Washington, D.C.

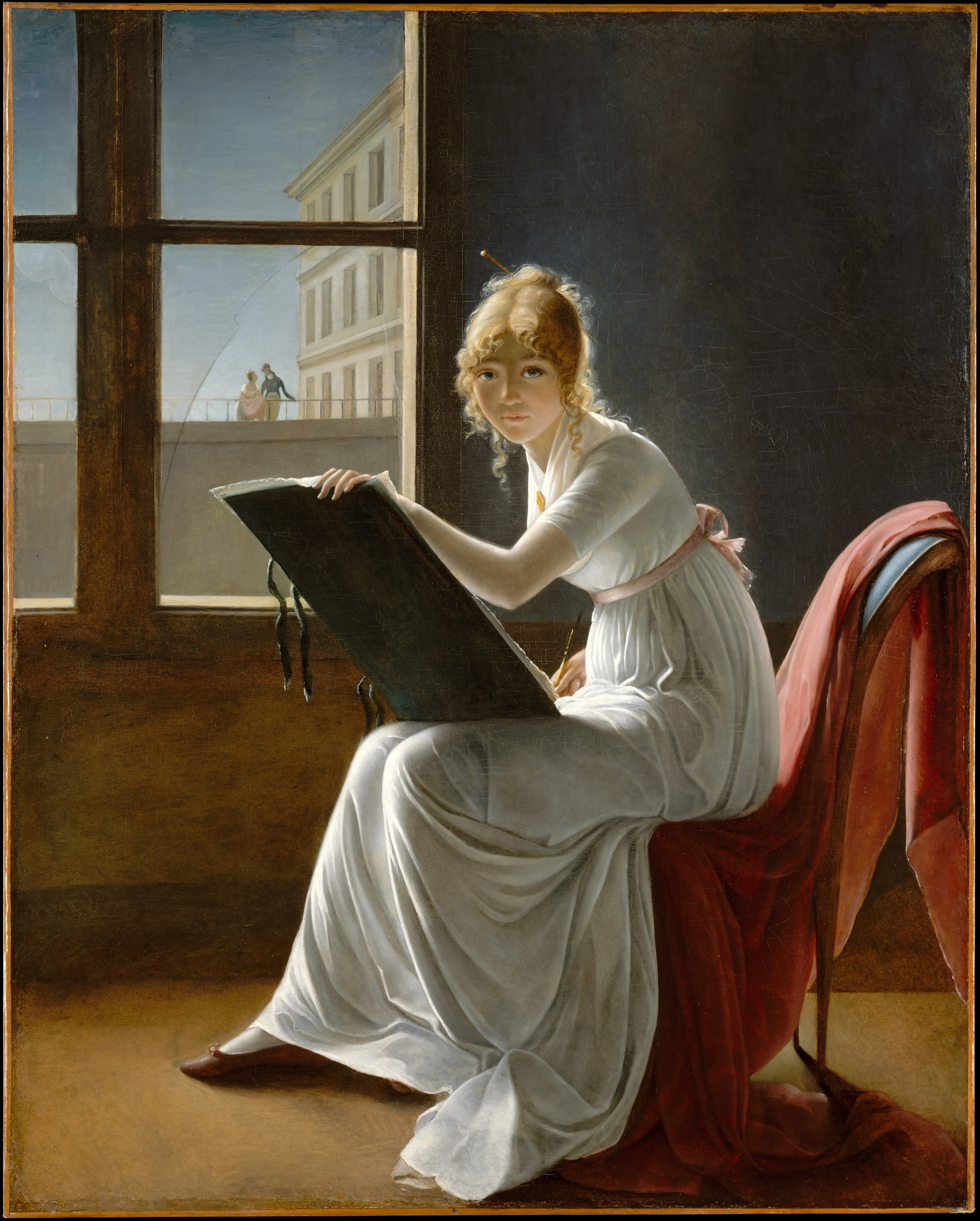
Marie-Denise Villers, Portrait of Charlotte du Val d'Ognes, 1801, Metropolitan Museum of Art

- Scarcity of biographical information
- Anonymity – Women artists were often most active in artistic expressions that were not typically signed. During the early medieval period, manuscript illumination was a pursuit of monks and nuns alike.
- Painters' Guilds – In the medieval and Renaissance periods, many women worked in the workshop system. These women worked under the auspices of a male workshop head, very often the artist's father. Until the twelfth century there is no record of a workshop headed by a woman, when a widow would be allowed to assume her husband's former position. Often guild rules forbade women from attaining the various ranks leading to master, so they remained "unofficial" in their status.
- Naming Conventions – the convention whereby women take their husbands' last names impedes research on female articles, especially in cases in which a work of unknown origin was signed only with a first initial and last name. Even the simplest biographical statements may be misleading. For example, one might say that Jane Frank was born in 1918, but in reality she was Jane Schenthal at birth – Jane "Frank" did not exist until over twenty years later. Examples like this create a discontinuity of identity for women artists.
- Mistaken identity and incorrect attribution – In the eighteenth and nineteenth centuries, work by women was often reassigned. Some unscrupulous dealers even went so far as to alter signatures, as in the case of some paintings by Judith Leyster (1630) that were reassigned to Frans Hals. Marie-Denise Villers (1774–1821) was a French painter who specialized in portraits. Villers was a student of the French painter Girodet. Villers' most famous painting, Young Woman Drawing, (1801) is displayed in the Metropolitan Museum of Art. The painting was attributed to Jacques-Louis David at one time, but was later realized to be Villers' work.

An additional reason behind the reluctance to accept female artists is that their skills are likely to differ from males, as a result of their experience and situation and as such this creates a sense of greatness for female art which was feared.

However, whilst there has been a misrepresentation of female artists there is a much deeper problem that has limited the number of female artists. There are no female comparisons to the works of Leonardo and Michelangelo. This is not due to lack of skill but the oppression and discouragement of women. The fault lies within education and the lack of opportunities that were given. It is against the odds that women have managed to achieve artistic skills in the face of the patriarchal and male-dominated art world.

== Women in Outsider art ==
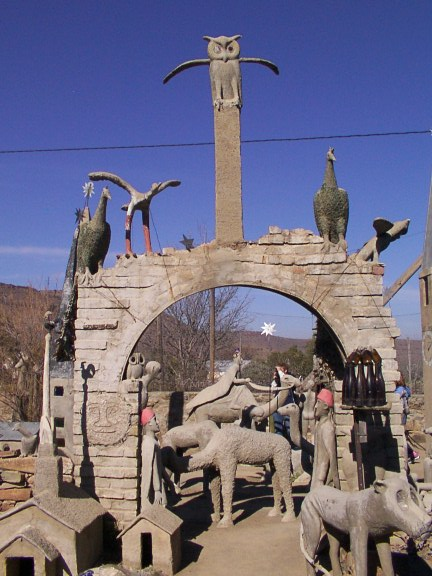
Helen Martins, the Owl House

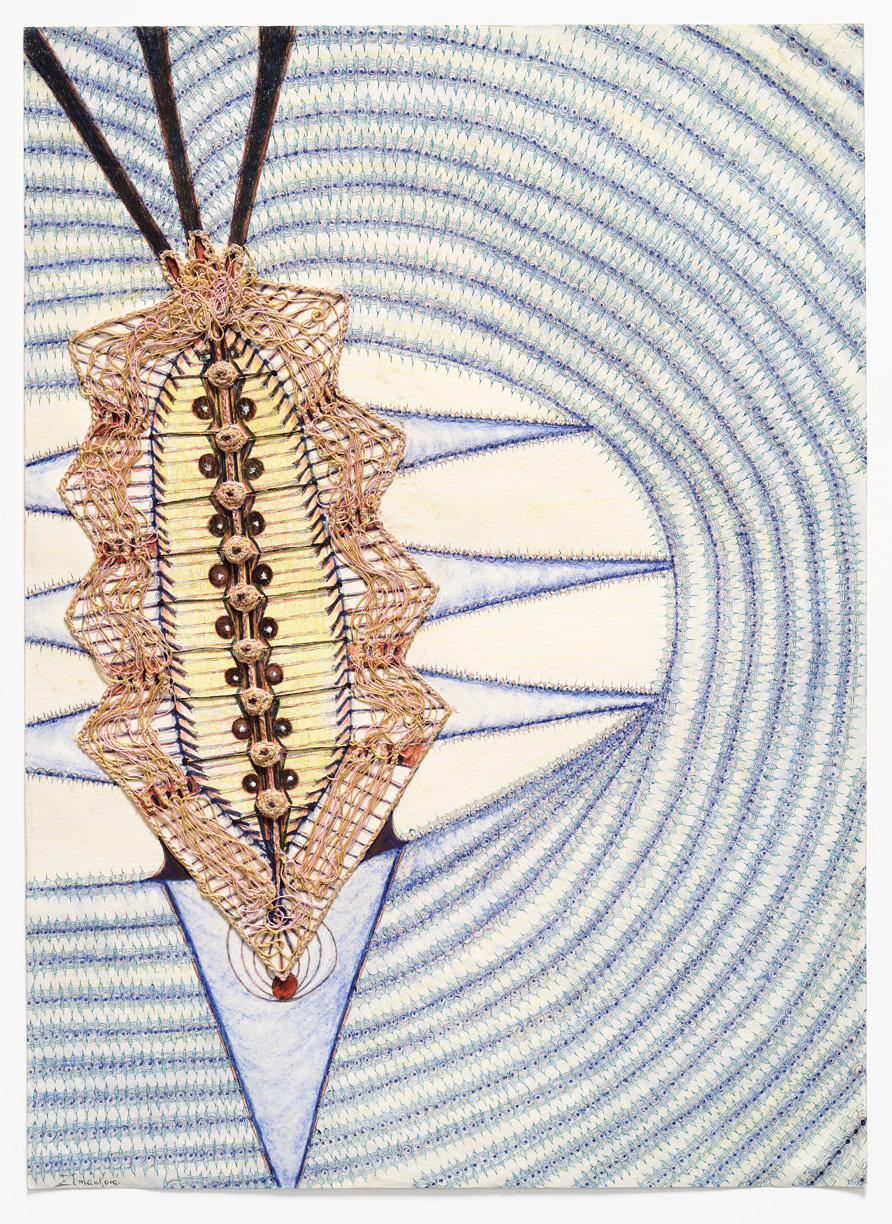
Anna Zemánková, Untitled, 1960s

The concept of outsider art arose in the 20th century when mainstream practitioners, collectors and critics began to consider the artistic expression of people without a conventional training. Among them would be, the self-taught, children, folk artists from around the world and inmates of mental institutions. Among the first to study this huge and mainly uncharted art space were members of the Blaue Reiter group in Germany, followed later by the French artist, Jean Dubuffet. Some of the noted women considered as exponents of "art brut", the French expression for outsider art, are:

- Holly Farrell, 21st century Canadian self taught artist whose paintings include the Barbie & Ken series, is considered an Outsider artist.
- Madge Gill (1882–1961) was an English mediumistic artist who made thousands of drawings "guided" by a spirit she called "Myrninerest" (my inner rest).
- Annie Hooper (1897–1986), a sculptor of visionary religious art from Buxton, North Carolina, who created nearly 5,000 sculptures depicting biblical scenes. Her work is now in the permanent collection of North Carolina State University.
- Georgiana Houghton (1814–1884), a British spiritualist medium, known for her visionary 'spirit drawings', consisting of intricate abstract watercolours.
- Mollie Jenson (1890–1973) created a series of large-scale concrete sculptures embellished with tile mosaics in River Falls, Wisconsin.
- Susan Te Kahurangi King (born 1951) is a New Zealand artist whose ability to speak declined by the age of four and stopped speaking altogether by age eight. King is an autistic savant who has methodically created an entire analogous world through extraordinary drawings using pen, graphite, coloured pencil, crayon and ink. She drew prolifically through to the early 1990s and then without reason suddenly stopped. King renewed drawing in 2008 during filming of a documentary on her artwork.
- Halina Korn (1902–1978) was a Pole of Jewish descent who settled in London during World War II. She was originally a writer who married the artist, Marek Żuławski, and took up sculpture and painting in mid-life. She painted the everyday and exhibited in England, Scotland, the US and Poland.
- Maud Lewis (1903–1970) was a Canadian folk artist. Lewis painted bright scenes of rural Nova Scotian life on found objects, including boards, construction materials, etc.
- Helen Martins (1897–1976) transformed the house she inherited from her parents in Nieu-Bethesda, South Africa, into a fantastical environment decorated with crushed glass and cement sculptures. The house is known as The Owl House.
- Grandma Moses (1860–1961), widely considered to be a painter of Folk art.
- Judith Scott (1943–2005) was born deaf and with Down syndrome. After being institutionalized for 35 years she attended Creative Growth Art Center (a center for artists with disabilities in Oakland, California) and went on to become an internationally renowned fiber art sculptor.
- Anna Zemánková (1908–1986) was a self-taught Czech painter, draftsman and pastel artist. Her work was featured in a group show at London's Hayward Gallery in 1979, and eighteen of her pieces were shown at the Venice Biennale in 2013.

== Art awards honoring women ==
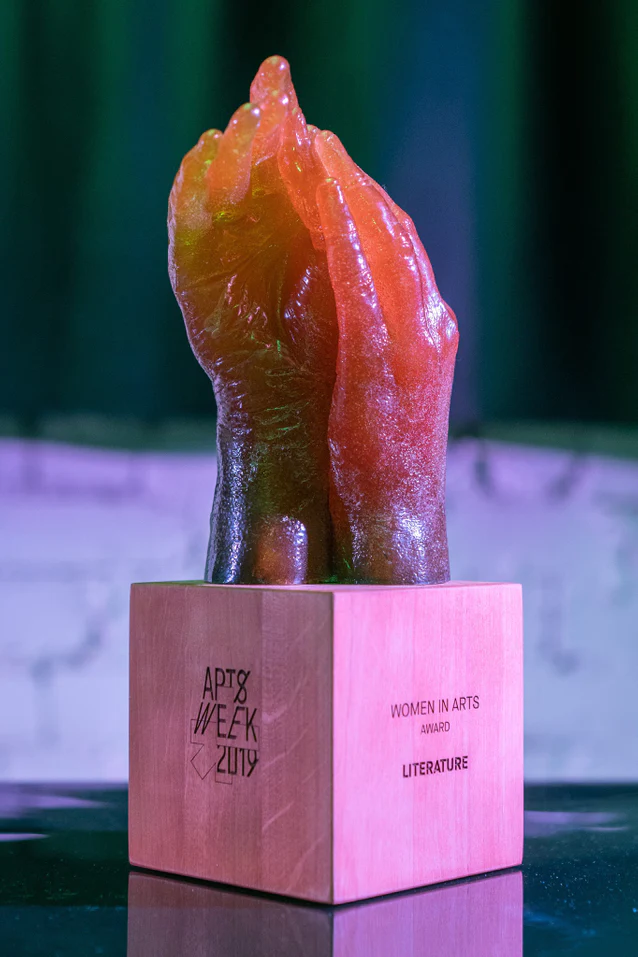
Ukraine's Women in Arts Award

Women artists have received many awards in the past, but almost all awards given exclusively for women have been established since the early 2000s. The exceptions were from the National Association of Women Artists, who gave awards to women artists throughout the 20th century and from the Women's Caucus for Art which has given the Women's Caucus for Art Lifetime Achievement Award since 1972.

Other significant awards are:

- Architecture + Women NZ Dulux Awards
- ArtTable Award
- AWARE Prize (French: Prix AWARE)
- Bennett Prize for Women Figurative Realists
- Inge Morath Award
- Joana Maria Gorvin Prize
- Les femmes s'exposent
- Max Mara Art Prize for Women
- Virginia Prize (French: Prix Virginia)
- Women Artist Award (PAM) (Spanish: Premio Artista Mujer)
- Women in Arts Award

== See also ==
- Lists of women artists (includes categories by country, medium, style, exhibition and time period)
- Australian feminist art timeline
- Native American women in the arts
- The Story of Women and Art, 2014 television documentary

By medium and style

- Female comics creators
- Female graffiti artists
- Women in photography
- Women surrealists

Exhibitions and museums

- All I Want (art exhibition)
- Australian Exhibition of Women's Work
- Bonn Women's Museum
- Exhibition by 31 Women
- Les femmes artistes d'Europe
- National Museum of Women in the Arts
- Twenty Six Contemporary Women Artists

Organizations and groups

- Advancing Women Artists Foundation
- Beaver Hall Group
- Women Environmental Artists Directory
- Women in Animation
- Women's International Art Club
- Women's Studio Workshop
