= Gabiou =

Gabiou is a surname. Notable people with the surname include:

- Jeanne-Elisabeth Chaudet (née Gabiou, died 1832), French artist
- Marie-Élisabeth Gabiou (c. 1761–1811), French artist
