= The Interior of an Atelier of a Woman Painter (Lemoine) =

Painting by Marie-Victoire Lemoine

- The Interior of a Woman Painter's Studio
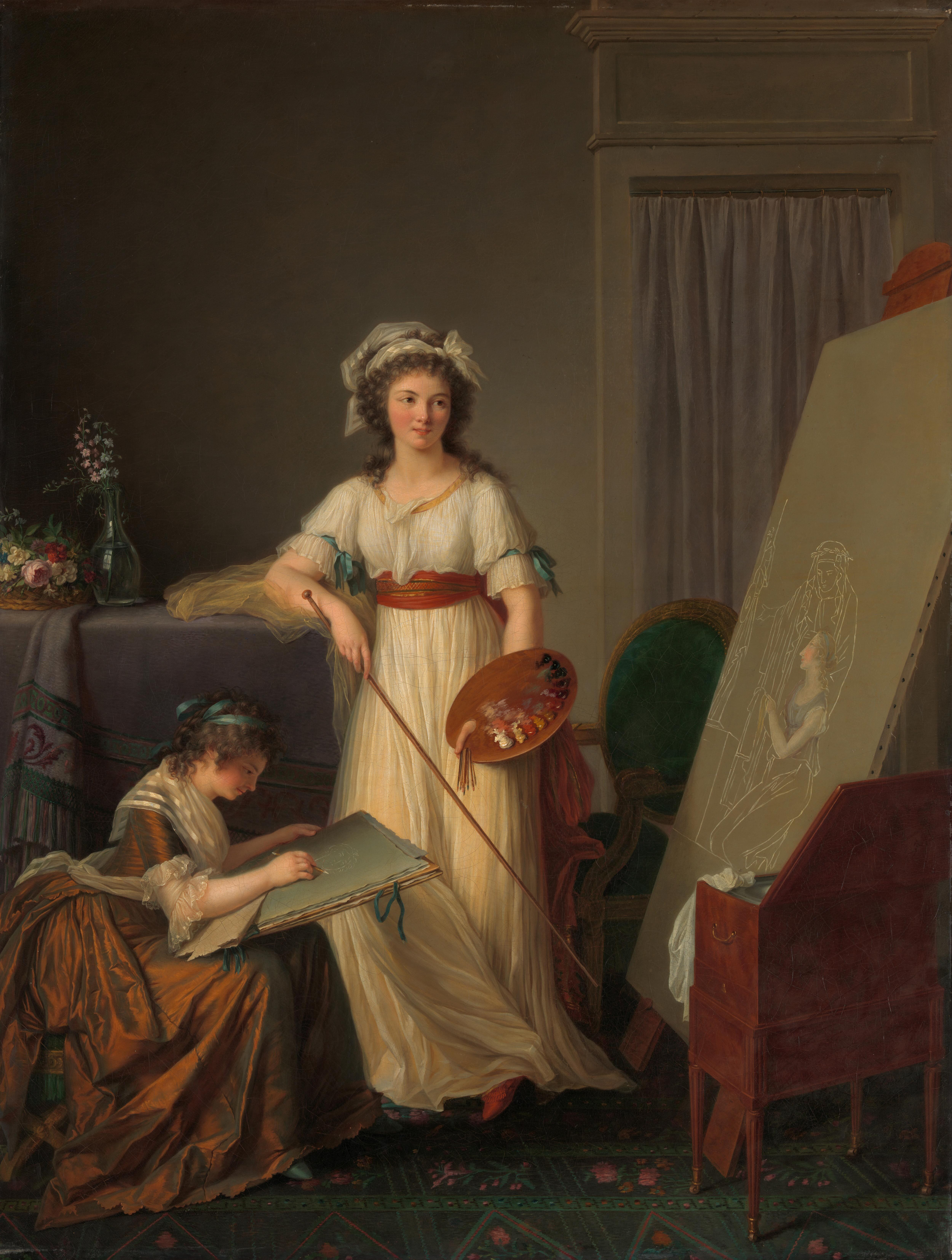
- Artist: Marie-Victoire Lemoine
- Year: 1789
- Medium: oil paint, canvas
- Dimensions: 116.5 cm (45.9 in) × 88.9 cm (35.0 in)
- Location: Metropolitan Museum of Art
- Accession: 57.103

The Interior of an Atelier of a Woman Painter is an oil-on-canvas painting created in 1789 by the French artist Marie-Victoire Lemoine. It is in the collection of the Metropolitan Museum of Art, in New York.

The work was believe to be a tribute to the painter Élisabeth Vigée Le Brun. However, later interpretation is that the subject is Marie-Victoire herself with her sister Marie-Élisabeth Gabiou.
