= Charlotte du Val d'Ognes =

French aristocrat

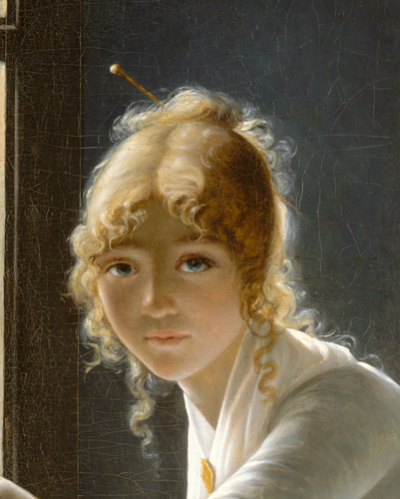
- Charlotte du Val d'Ognes in her youth, aged roughly 15 or 16, in 1801.
- Born: Marie Joséphine Charlotte du Val d'Ognes; 1786; Kingdom of France
- Died: 1868 (aged 81-82)
- Years active: 1801
- Known for: Being the subject of Portrait of Charlotte du Val d'Ognes

Charlotte du Val d'Ognes, born Marie Joséphine Charlotte du Val d'Ognes, (1786 - 1868) was a French aristocrat who is notable for being the subject of the 1801 portrait painting Portrait of Charlotte du Val d'Ognes by Marie-Denise Villers.

== Biography ==
Marie Joséphine Charlotte du Val d'Ognes was born into the French aristocratic Val d'Ognes family in 1786, making her a pre-French Revolution aristocrat.

In 1801, d'Ognes, aged 15 or 16, sat for a portrait, which was probably painted by Marie-Denise Villers, who was a friend of d'Ognes. This portrait remains one of the few surviving glimpses into Charlotte du Val d'Ognes's life.

d'Ognes died in 1868 aged 81 or 82.
