= Portrait of Charlotte du Val d'Ognes =

Painting by Marie Denise Villers

- Marie Joséphine Charlotte du Val d'Ognes
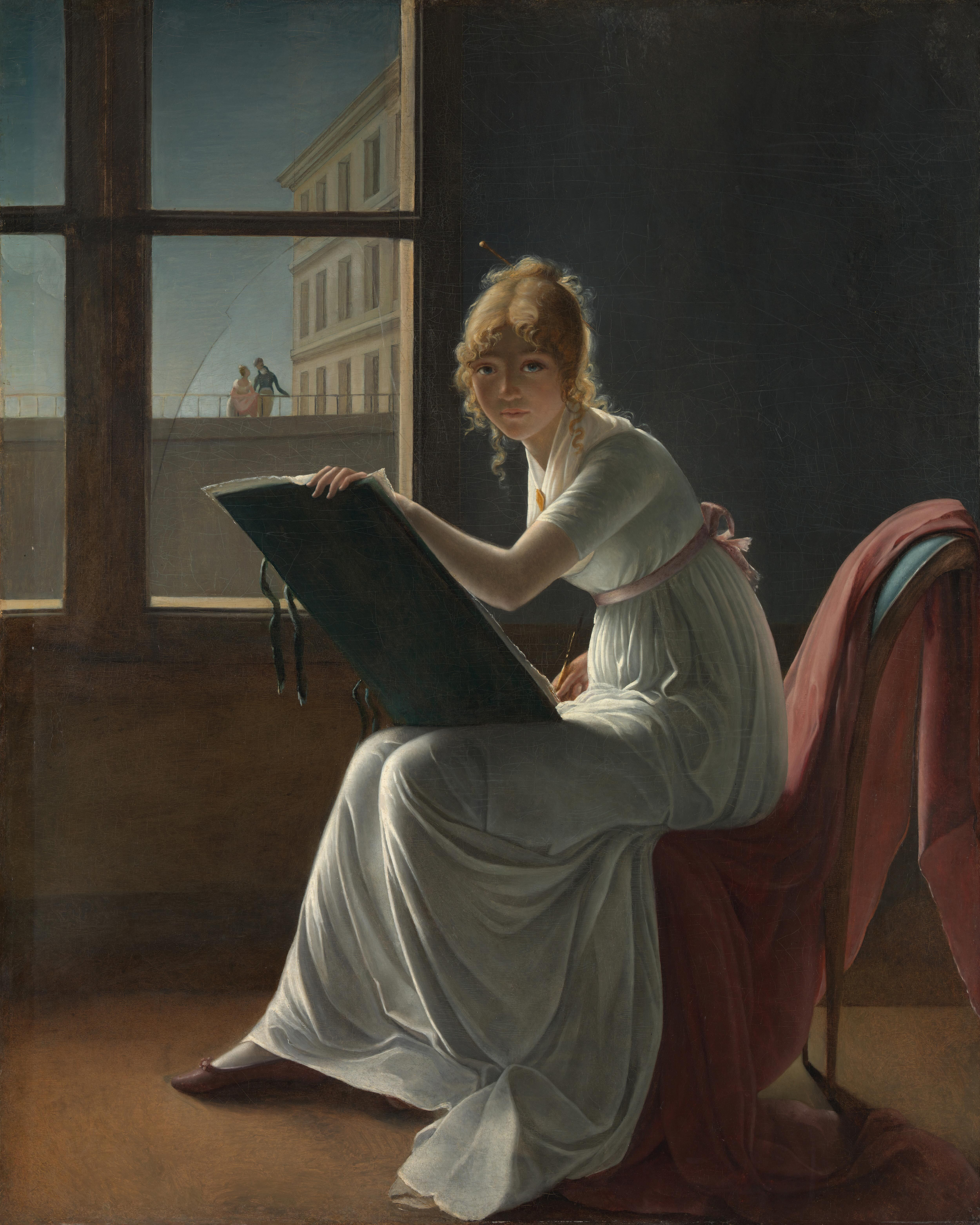
- Artist: Marie-Denise Villers
- Year: 1801
- Medium: oil paint, canvas
- Dimensions: 161.3 cm (63.5 in) × 128.6 cm (50.6 in)
- Location: Metropolitan Museum of Art
- Accession: 17.120.204

Portrait of Charlotte du Val d'Ognes is an 1801 painting (portrait painting) attributed to Marie-Denise Villers. It is in the collection of the Metropolitan Museum of Art. The painting was first acquired by the museum in 1922 and attributed to Jacques Louis David. Later, the painting was attributed to Constance Marie Charpentier and finally to Villers.

== Early history and creation ==
Because the painting is unsigned, it has been attributed incorrectly over time. It was first exhibited at the Salon of 1801, during the year that Jacques Louis David boycotted the exhibition. A member of the Val d'Ognes family believed it had been painted by David.

== Later history and display ==
The Met bought the painting, attributed to David, for two hundred thousand dollars in 1922. In 1951, Charles Sterling of the Met admitted that the painting may not have been David's. Sterling was first tipped off that the painting was not David's because the artist had boycotted the 1801 Salon. The mistake was published in the Met's January 1951 Bulletin. The painting may have been Constance Marie Charpentier's because of some evidence found in Salon entries seem to indicate it was hers, but David's name did not come off of the frame until 1977. Sterling's reattribution of the painting to Charpentier was also based on analysis of her painting, Melancholy (1801).

Later, in 1996, Margaret Oppenheimer realized that the painting should instead be attributed to Marie Denise Villers. Oppenheimer's reattribution is based on a modello by Villers, A Young Woman Seated by a Window.

In 2011 Anne Higonnet argued that the work is a self-portrait.

== Description and interpretation ==
The work depicts the 15 or 16 year old woman Marie Joséphine Charlotte du Val d'Ognes (1786 - 1868) drawing in front of a broken window. Behind d'Ognes, a couple stand on a parapet. In the Concise Dictionary of Women Artists (2001), Valerie Mainz describes the broken window as a "tour de force of the painter's art distinguishing, in its trompe-l'oeil effect, the view of the scene outside as to be seen as only partly through glass." The room depicted in the painting is actually a gallery of the Louvre, as discovered by art historian Anne Higonnet.

During the time when the picture was presumed to be David's, it was assumed that the woman in the painting was his student, drawing him as he painted her. Andre Maurois said that it was "a perfect picture, unforgettable." Critical response to the work prior to attributing the work to Charpentier was often positive.

After Sterling admitted the picture may not be David's, he called it a "merciless portrait of an intelligent, homely woman." He also felt that the anatomy of the portrait was incorrect. Other critics suddenly found faults in the portrait, now that it was no longer considered a David and ascribed to Charpentier instead. James Laver wrote of the painting in 1964, "Although the painting is extremely attractive as a period piece, there are certain weaknesses of which a painter of David's calibre would not have been guilty."

In a more modern take, Germaine Greer wrote that the picture "does not seek to charm, nor does it seek to portray the sexual vitality of its sitter" and felt that it was a feminist painting in nature. Other feminist critics began to ascribe a feminine aspect to the painting.

The Louvre gallery discovered by Higonnet in 2014 was used by women to teach and be instructed in art. Higonnet therefore believes the painting is a portrait of a woman by a woman. The named woman, Charlotte du Val d'Ognes, once wanted to be a professional artist, but chose instead to give up art when she was married. Bridget Quinn describes the painting as a moment where "two young women longing to make art found themselves in a brief period of opportunity, when instruction, exhibition and even fame were possible."
