= Marie-Victoire Lemoine =

French artist (1754–1820)

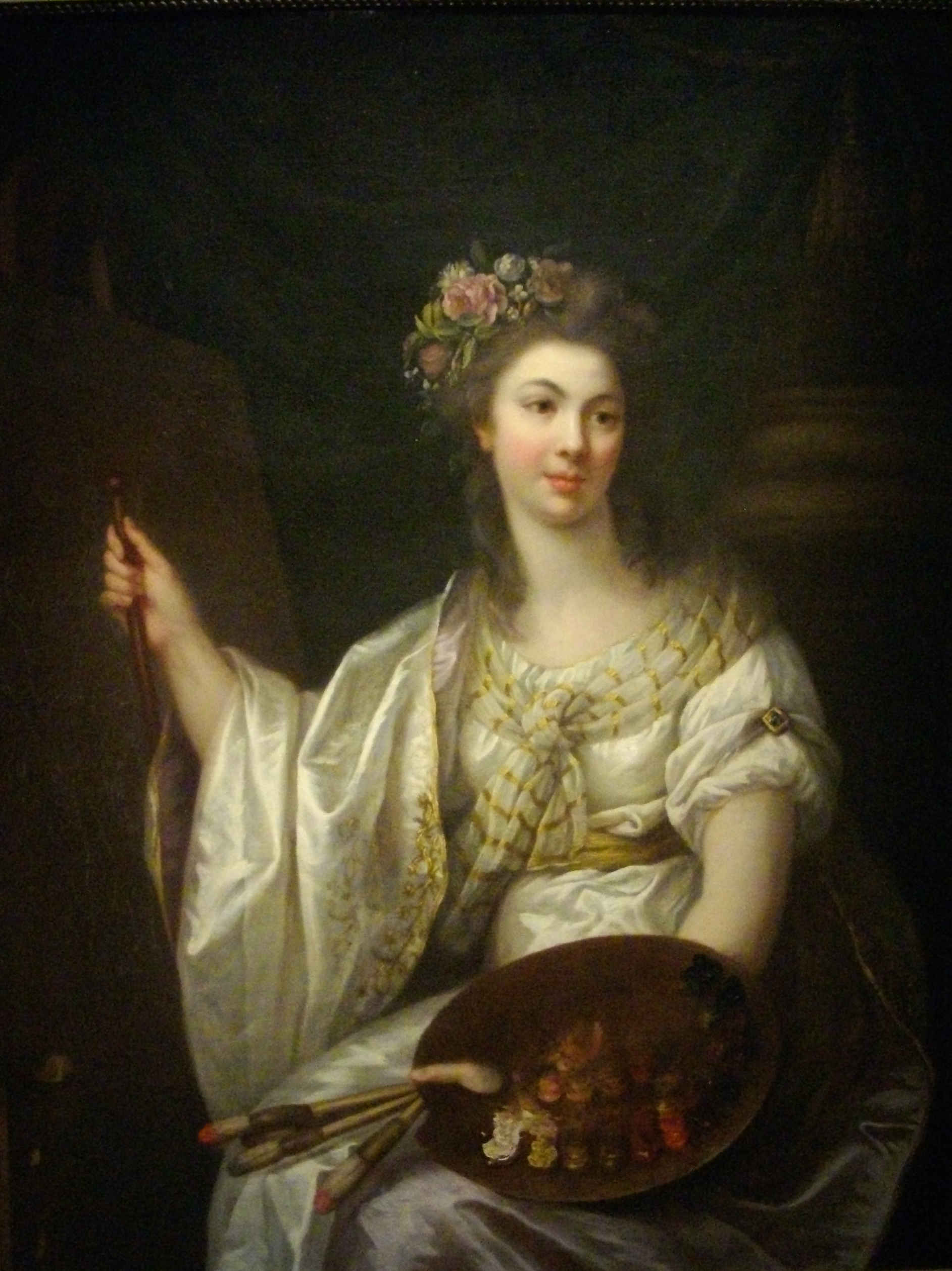
- Marie Victoire Lemoine, Portrait of the Artist, c. 1780–1790
- Born: 1754; Paris, France
- Died: 2 December 1820 (aged 65–66); Paris, France
- Known for: Painting

Marie-Victoire Lemoine (French: [ma.ʁi vik.twaʁ lə.mwan]; 1754 – 2 December 1820) was a French classicist painter.

== Life ==
Born in Paris, Marie-Victoire Lemoine was the eldest daughter of four sisters to Charles Lemoine and Marie-Anne Rousselle. Her sisters, Marie-Denise Villers and Marie-Élisabeth Gabiou, also became painters. She was first cousins with Jeanne-Elisabeth Chaudet through her mother's side. Unlike her sisters, she remained unmarried and became one of the few women in contemporary art that made a living through painting.

She was a student of François-Guillaume Ménageot in the early 1770s, with whom she lived and worked in a house acquired by the art dealer Jean-Baptiste-Pierre Lebrun, next to the studio of Élisabeth-Louise Vigée-Le Brun (1755–1842), France's leading woman painter. Ménageot was ten years older than Lemoine. From 1779, Marie-Victoire Lemoine lived in her parents' home until she moved in with her sister Marie-Elisabeth, where she remained even after her sister's death. She died six years after her last exhibition, aged sixty-six. At the time of her death, she only left 10 Francs in cash and clothing and linen valued at 181 Francs and 50 Centimes, which amounts to only US$53 in cash and US$5,600 for the clothing and linen in today's currency.

== Work ==
Marie-Victoire Lemoine mainly painted portraits, miniatures, and genre scenes. She was most active in the art community during the late 1780s and the early 1790s. Lemoine set up her first salon in 1774. She took part in numerous Salons, for example, her first solo exhibition was held at Pahin de la Blancherie's Salon de Correspondance in 1779, where she exhibited a now untraced portrait of the Princess Lamballe (57 x 45 cm). Five years after the Parisian Salon allowed women to participate, she exhibits there for the first time in 1796. She continued to display her works of art to the public in the salons of 1796, 1798, 1799, 1802, 1804, and 1814. Lemoine was known to sign her paintings with the signature "M. Vic Lemoine."

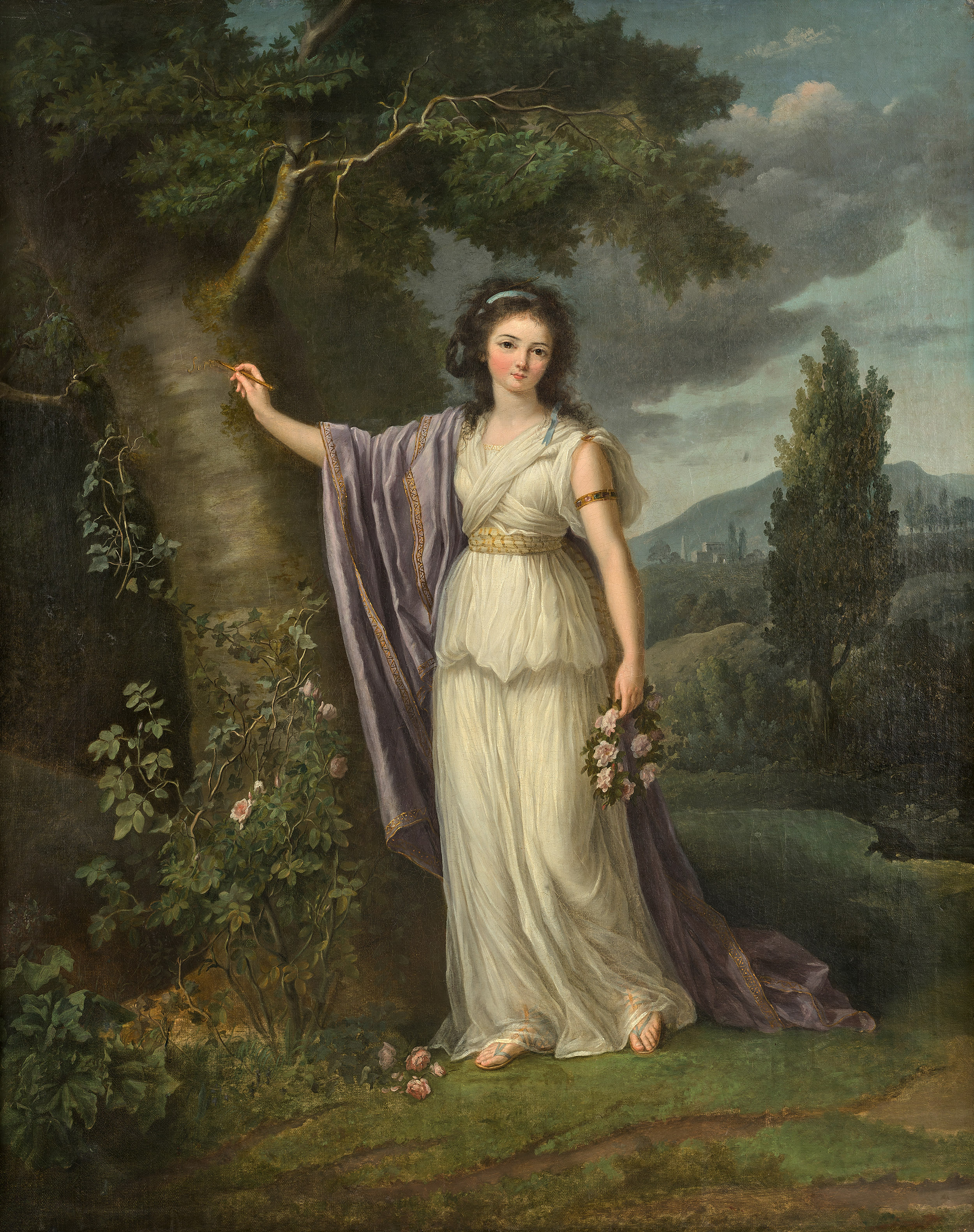
Portrait of Mlle de Genlis, 1789

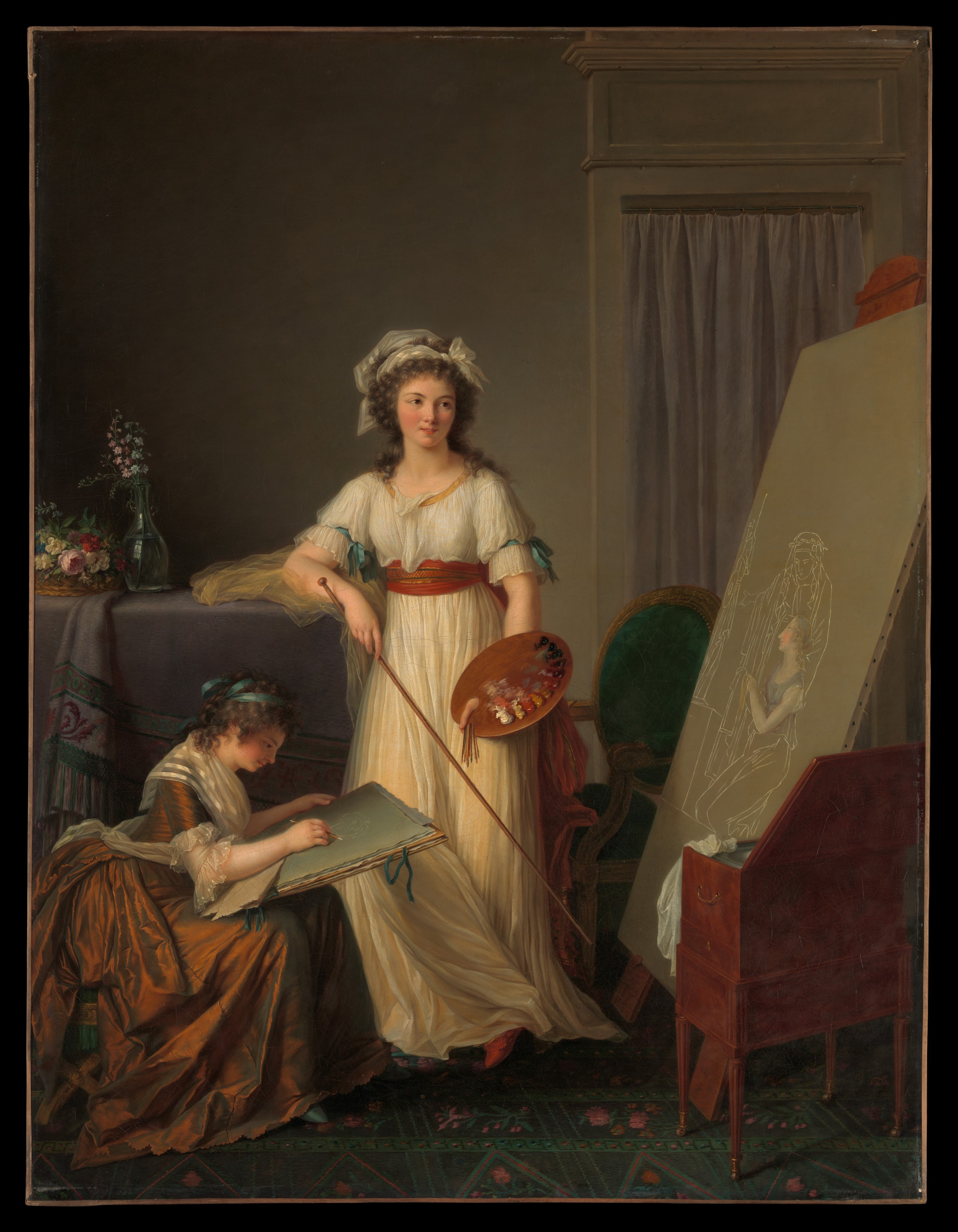
Marie-Victoire Lemoine's The Interior of an Atelier of a Woman Painter, 1789, at first interpreted as Vigée Le Brun with a student. Later interpretation is that the subject is Marie-Victoire herself with her sister Marie-Elisabeth

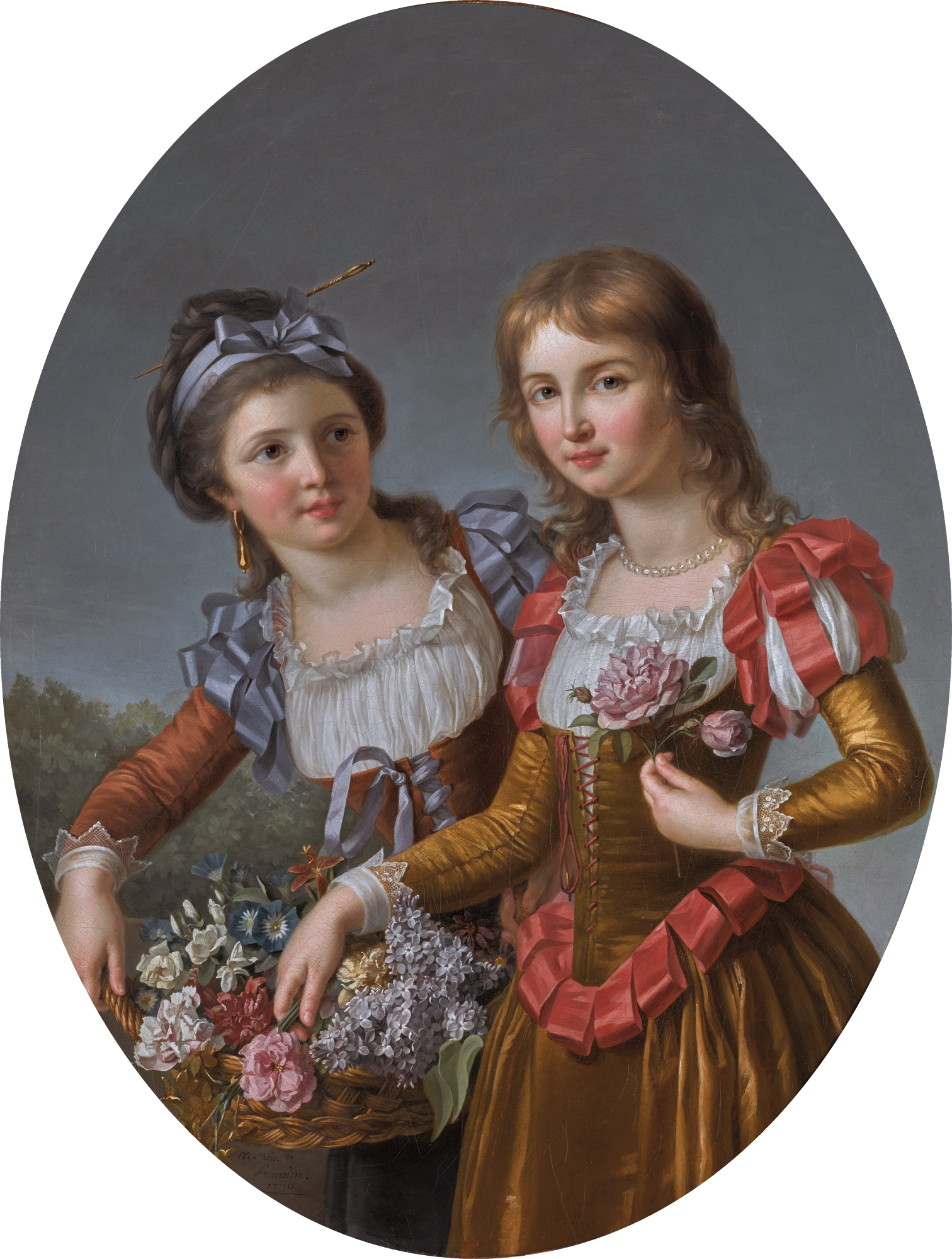
The Two Sisters, 1790

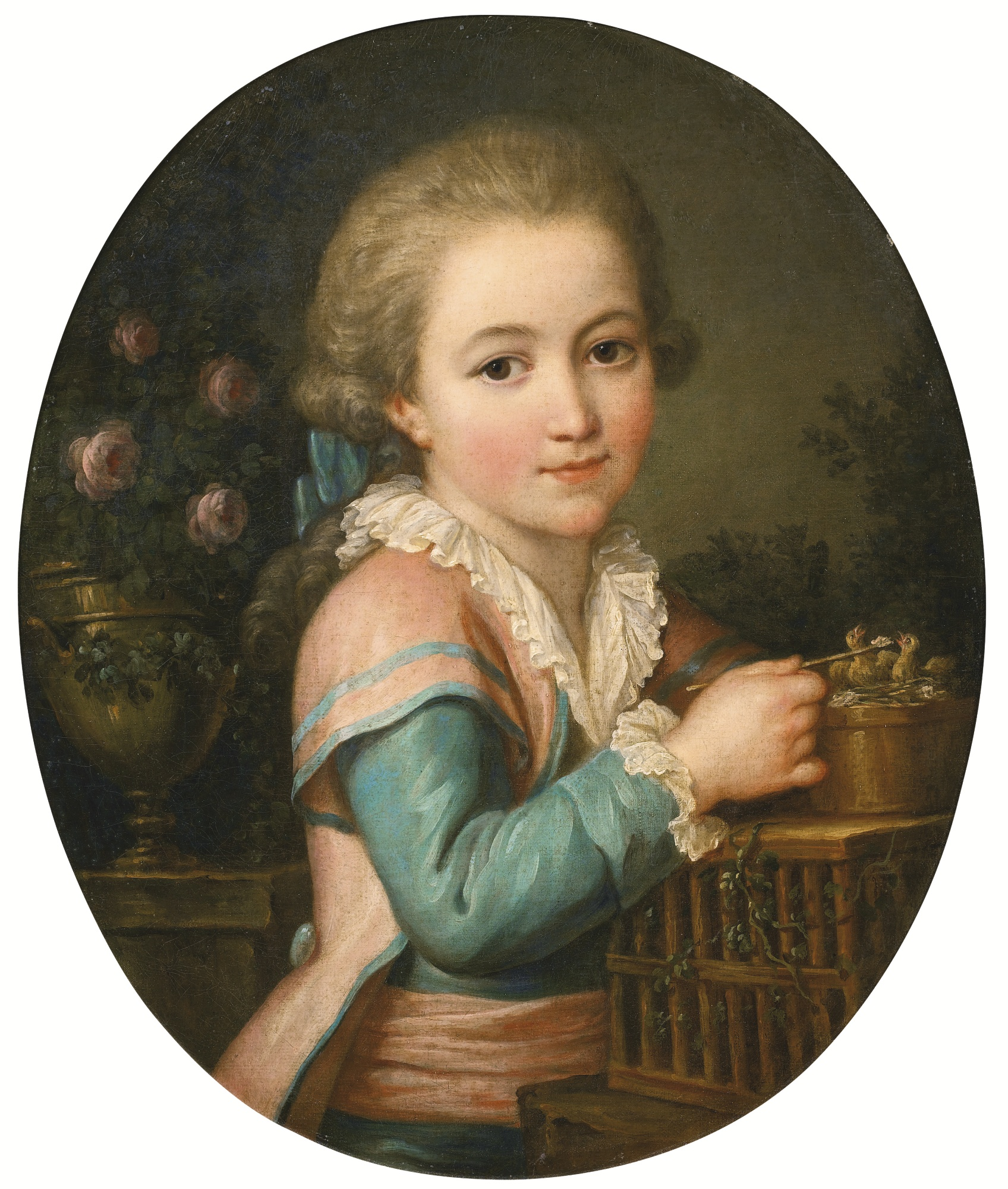
Portrait of a Boy Feeding Two Birds

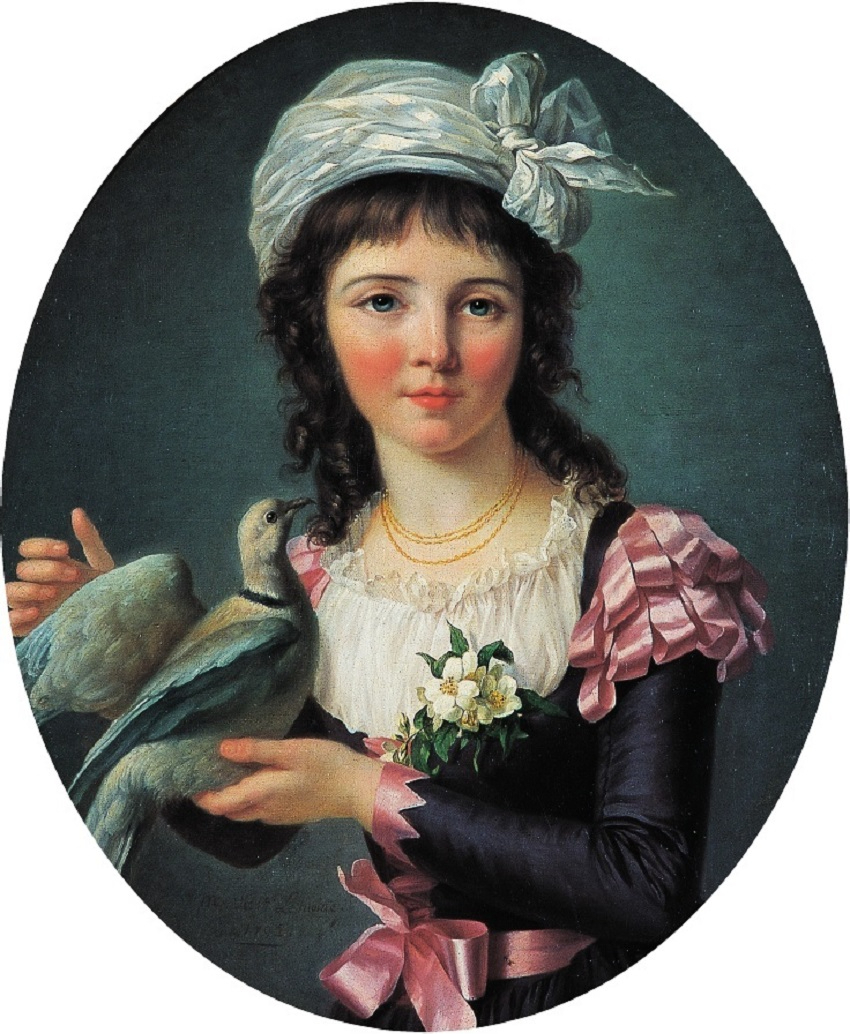
A Girl Holding a Dove, 1793

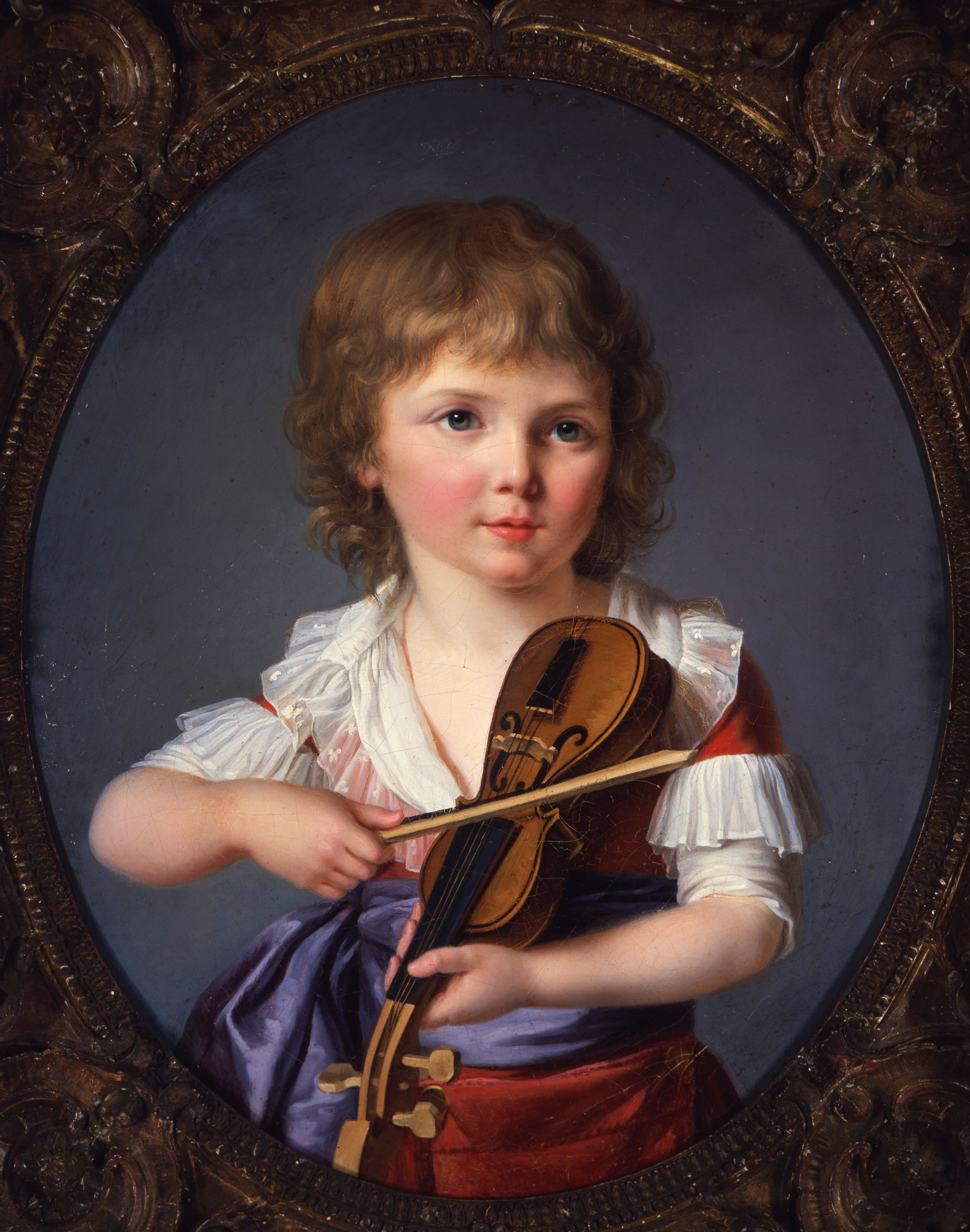
Portrait of Henri Gabiou, the artist's nephew, playing the violin, circa 1791-1796

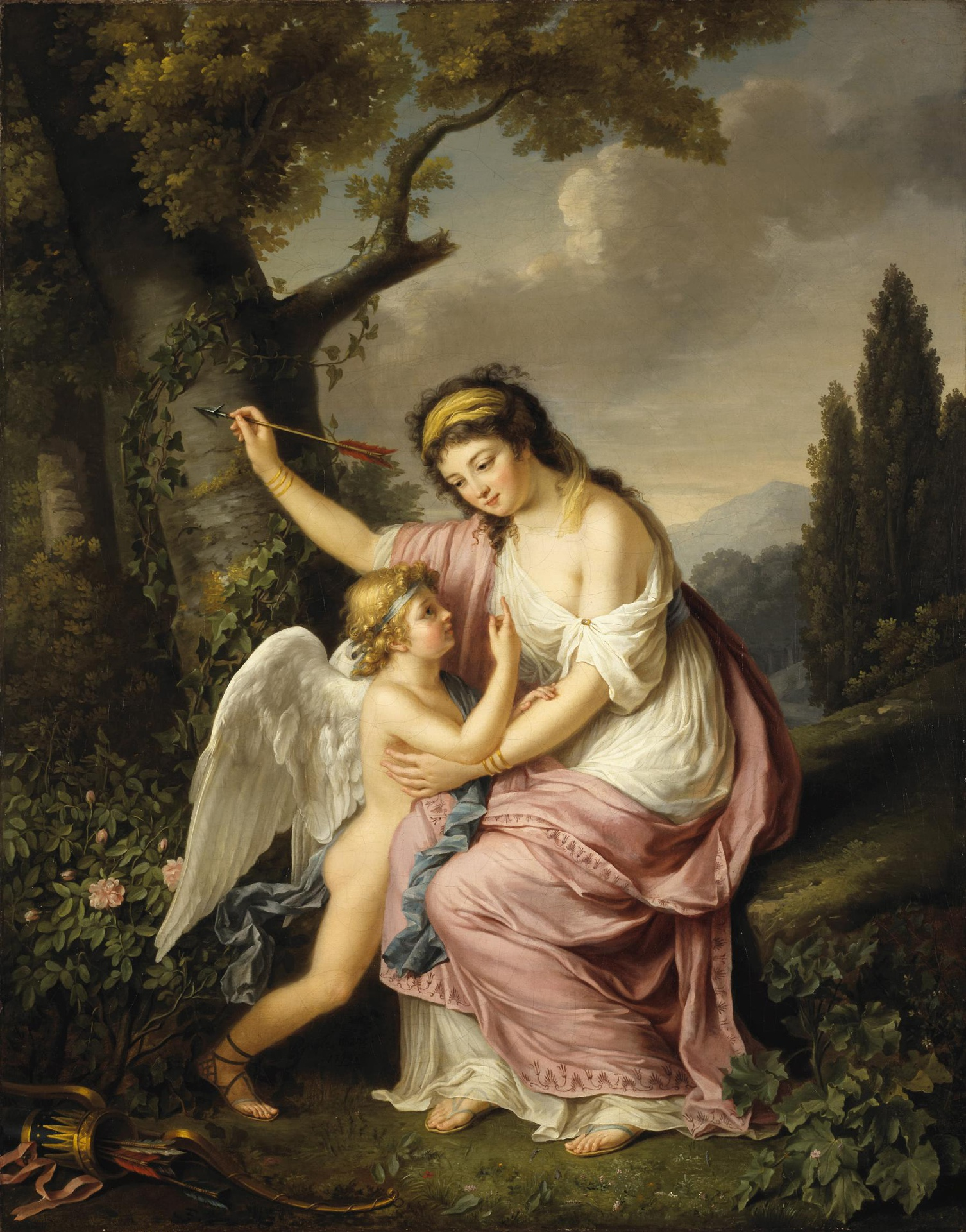
Woman and Cupid, 1792

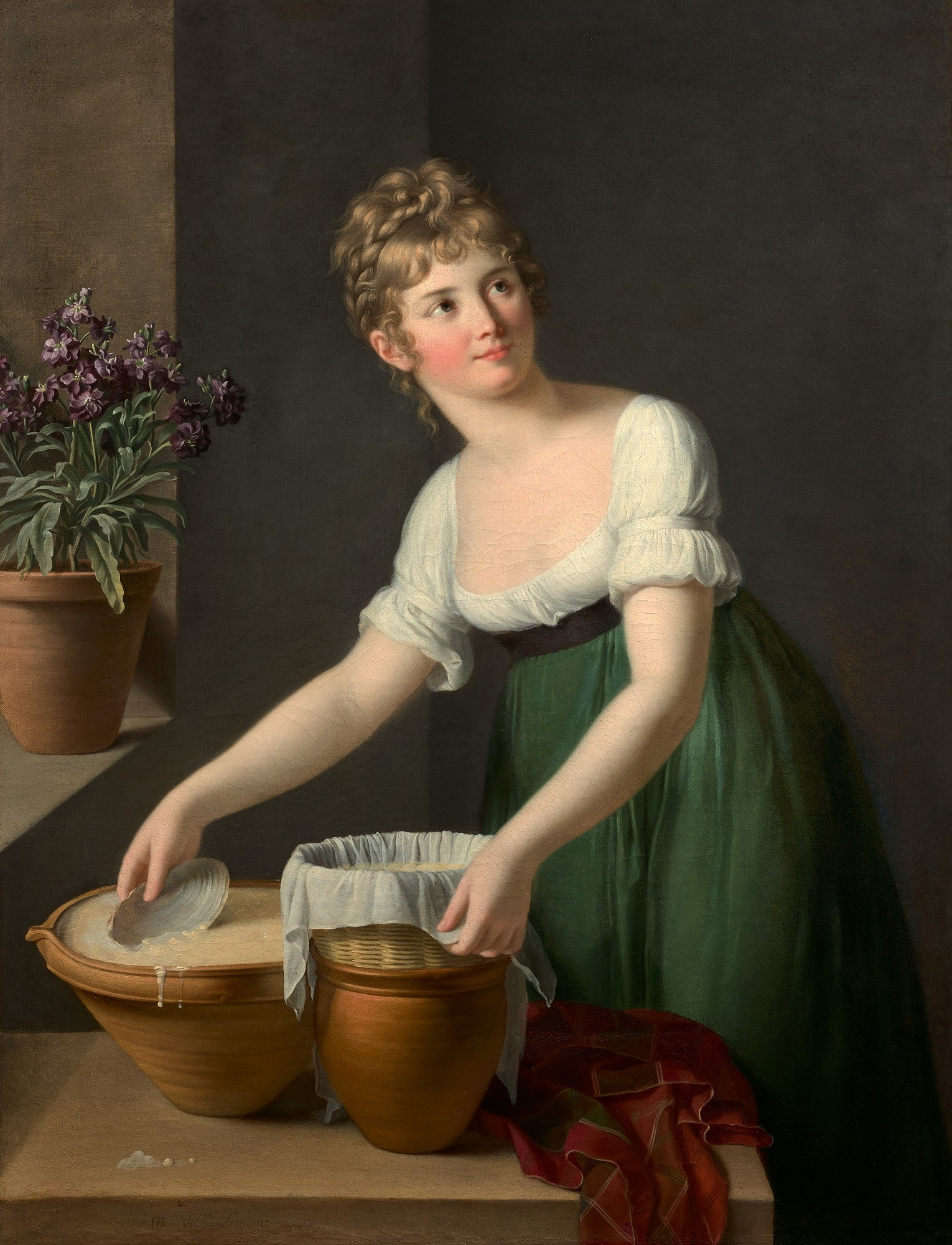
Young Woman Making Cheese, circa 1802
