= Constance Marie Charpentier =

French artist (1767–1849)

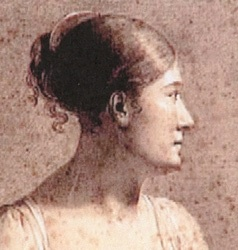
- Self portrait
- Born: Constance-Marie Blondelu; 4 April 1767; Paris, France
- Died: 3 August 1849 (aged 82); Paris, France
- Known for: Painting

Constance Marie Charpentier (born 4 April 1767 Paris, – 3 August 1849 Paris) was a French painter. She specialized in genre scenes and portraits, mainly of children and women. She was also known as Constance Marie Blondelu.

== Life and career ==
Records of Charpentier's training are unclear, but she might have studied with numerous artists. It is generally accepted that she studied with the acclaimed French painter Jacques-Louis David, but she may also have been a pupil of François Gérard, Pierre Bouillon, Louis Lafitte and either Johann Georg Wille or his son, Pierre-Alexandre Wille.

Some of the works previously attributed to her teacher, Jacques-Louis David, are now believed to belong to Charpentier. The well-known painting Young Woman Drawing (1801) was incorrectly attributed first to David, before it was reattributed to Charpentier; however it is now believed to be the work of her contemporary Marie-Denise Villers.

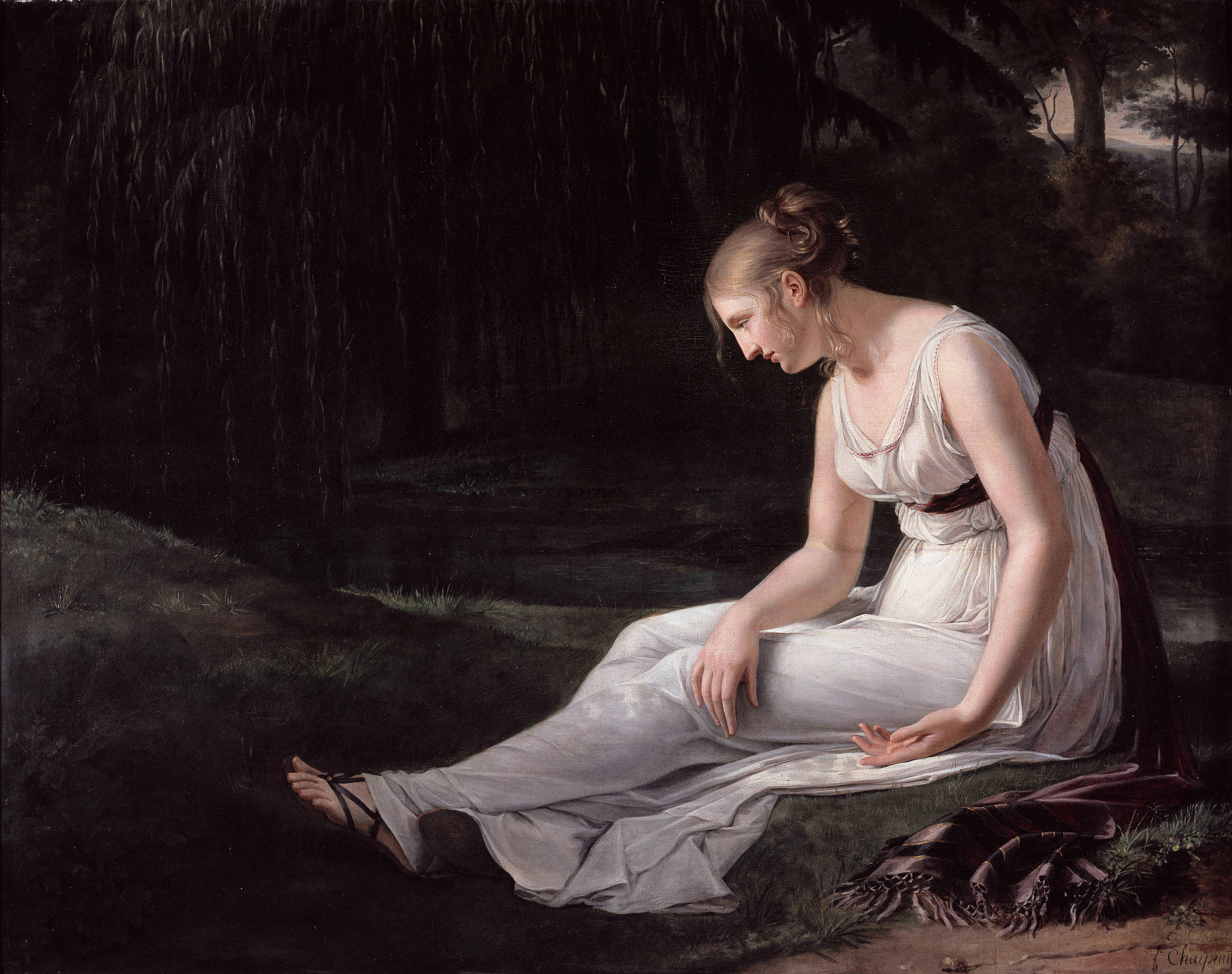
Constance Marie Charpentier, Melancholy, 1801, oil on canvas, 130 x 165 cm. Musée de Picardie, Amiens, France

In 1788 she received a 'Prix d'Encouragement.' From 1795 to 1819 she exhibited approximately thirty paintings at various Salons, winning a gold medal in 1814 at the Paris Salon and a silver medal in 1821 at the Salon at Douai. Based on surviving, positively identified works by Charpentier, she is considered one of the finest portrait painters of her era.
