= Jeanne-Elisabeth Chaudet =

French artist (died 1832)

- Born: Jeanne-Elisabeth Gabiou; 23 January 1767; Paris, France
- Died: 18 April 1832 (aged 65); Paris, France
- Citizenship: France
- Spouse(s): Antoine Denis Chaudet (1793–1810); Pierre-Arsène Denis Husson (1812–18??)

Jeanne-Elisabeth Chaudet (née Gabiou; born 23 January 1767, died 18 April 1832) was a French painter and the wife of the sculptor Antoine Denis Chaudet, who had also been her teacher.

Her father, Louis Gabiou, was a wig maker. After the death of her first husband in 1810, she married, secondly, in 1812, to Pierre-Arsène Denis Husson, a civil servant. Her painting Portrait of Madame Villot, née Barbier, was included in the 1905 book Women Painters of the World. She continued to exhibit at the Salon until 1817. She died of cholera.

Chaudet was the sister-in-law of painter Marie-Élisabeth Gabiou; she was also a first cousin of Gabiou and her sisters, Marie-Denise Villers and Marie-Victoire Lemoine.

== Gallery ==
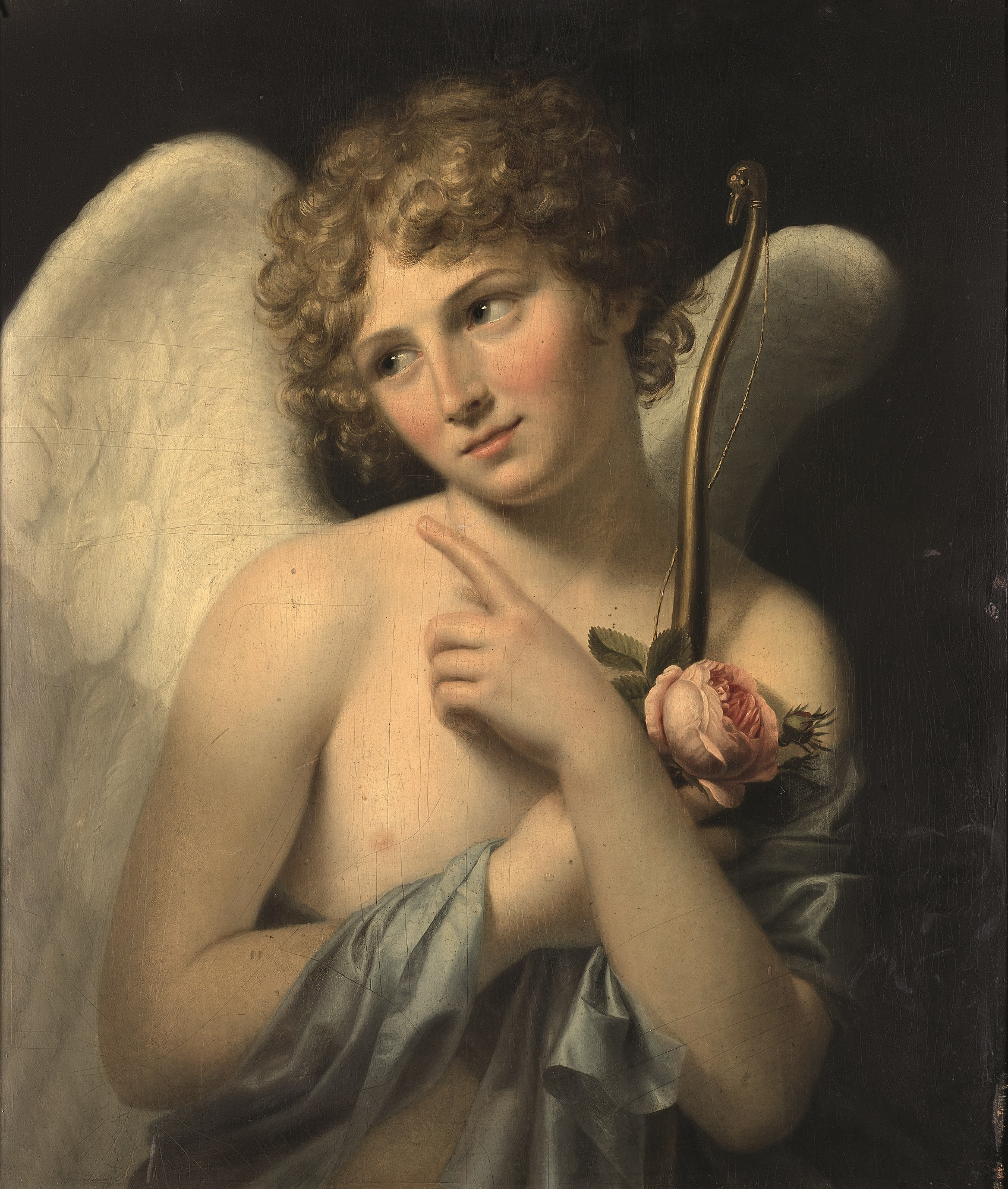
Cupid depicted in Love who has just stolen a rose, circa 1796 (private collection)

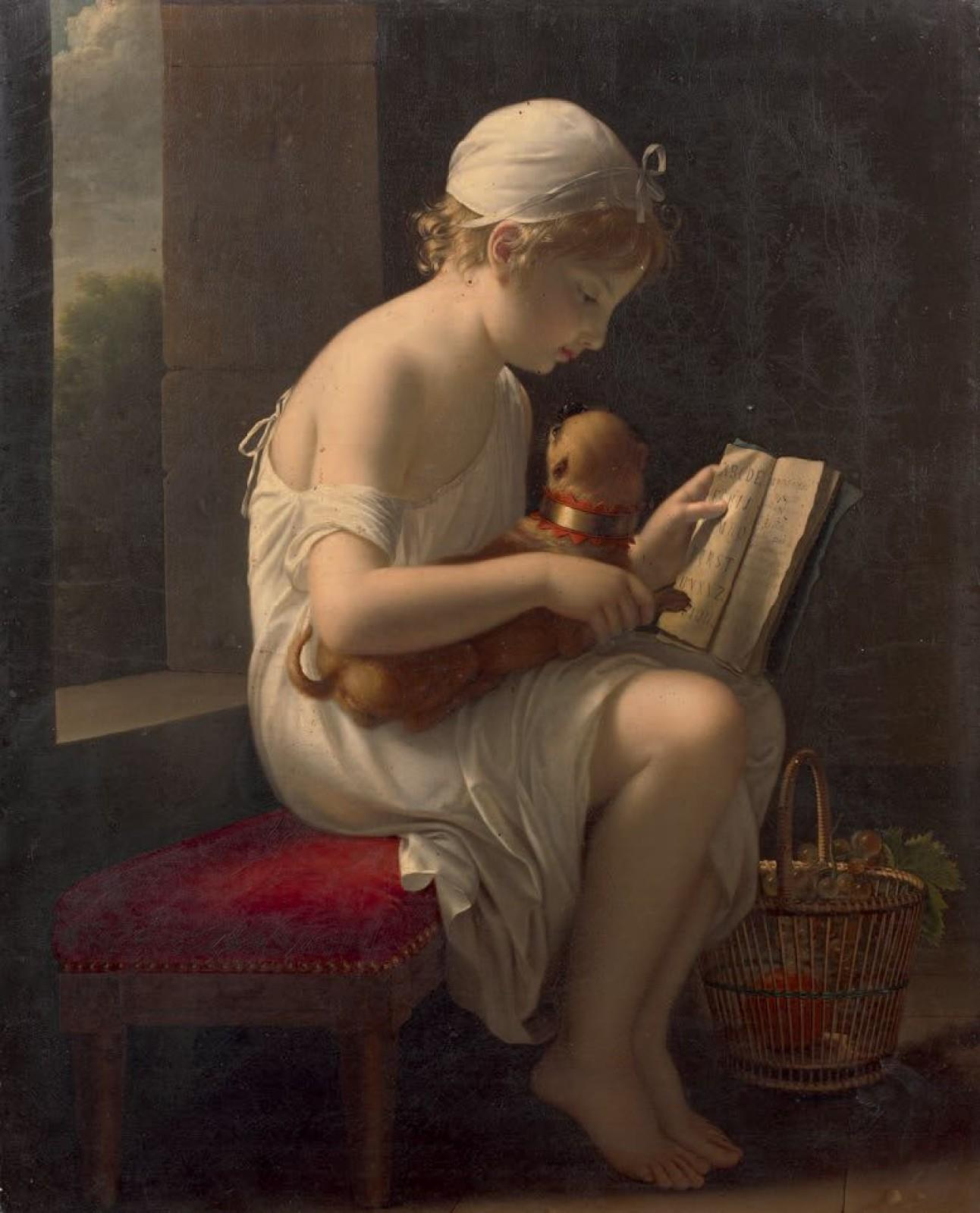
A little girl wanting to teach her dog how to read, circa 1799 (private collection)

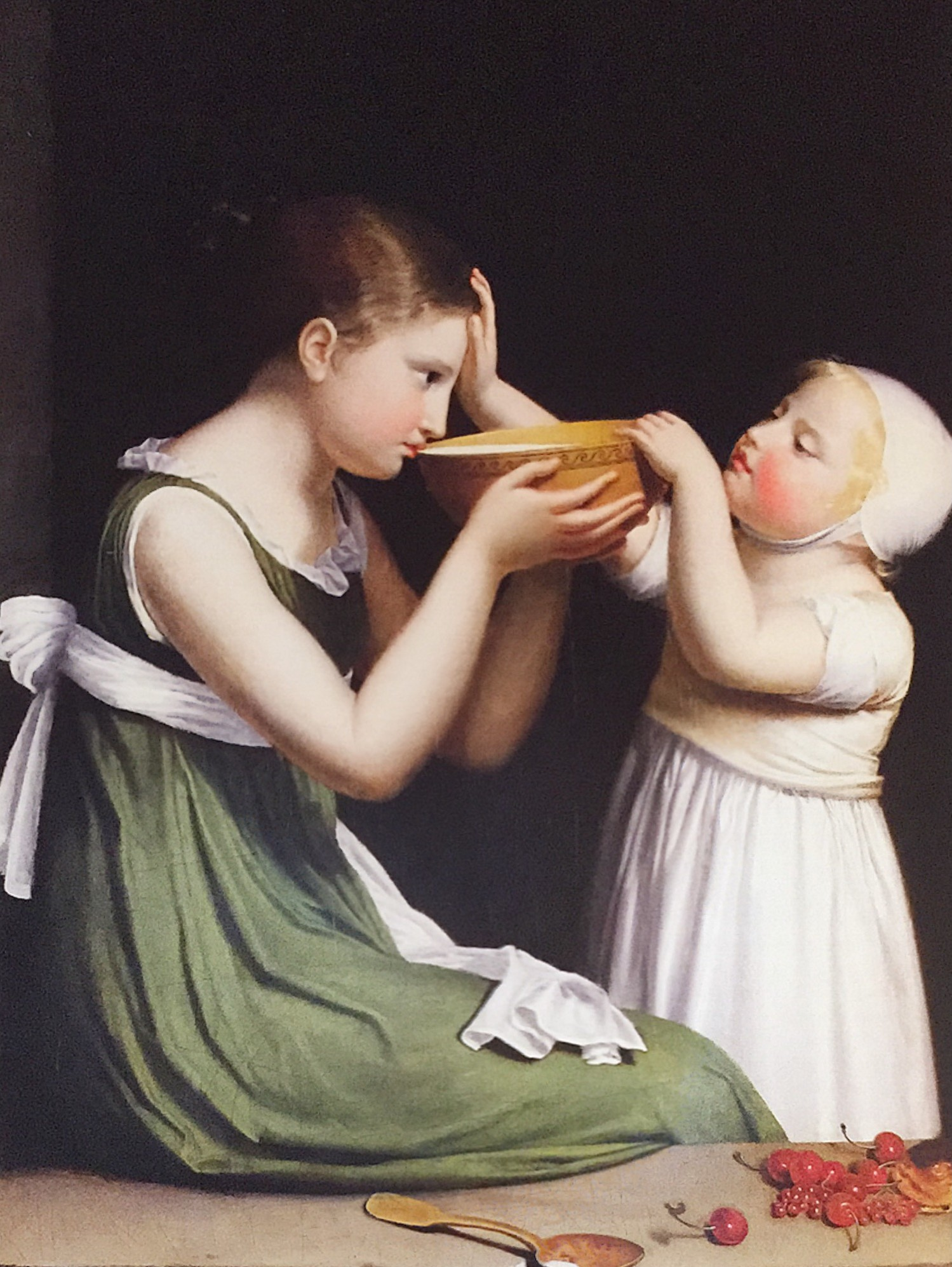
A children's breakfast, circa 1800 (private collection)

The Sleeping Child in the Care of a Brave Dog, circa 1801 (Rochefort, musée d'Art et d'Histoire - Musée Hèbre de Saint-Clément)

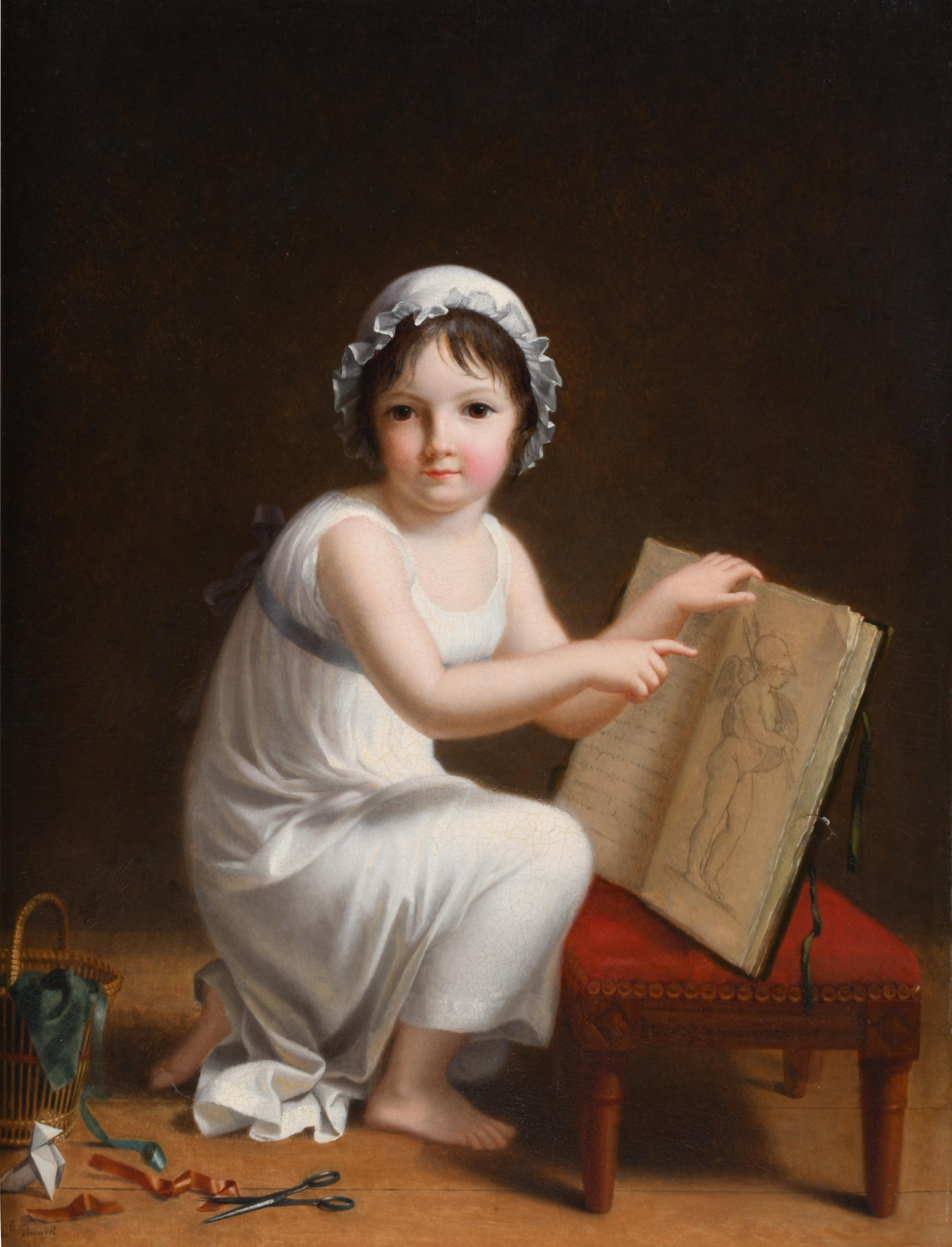
A Child Showing Pictures from a Book, circa 1801 (private collection)

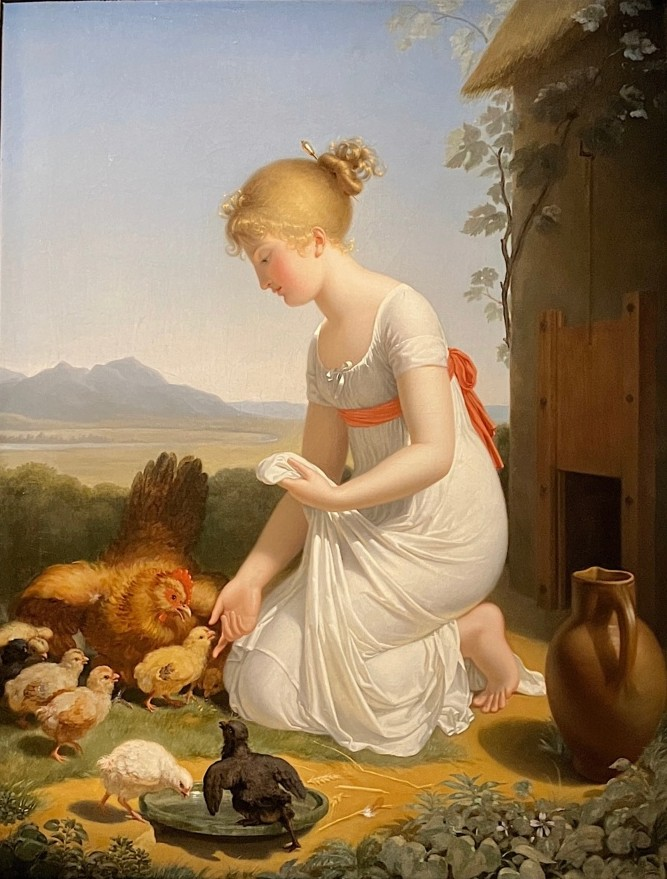
Young Girl Feeding Her Chickens, circa 1802 (Napoleonmuseum, Arenenberg Castle)

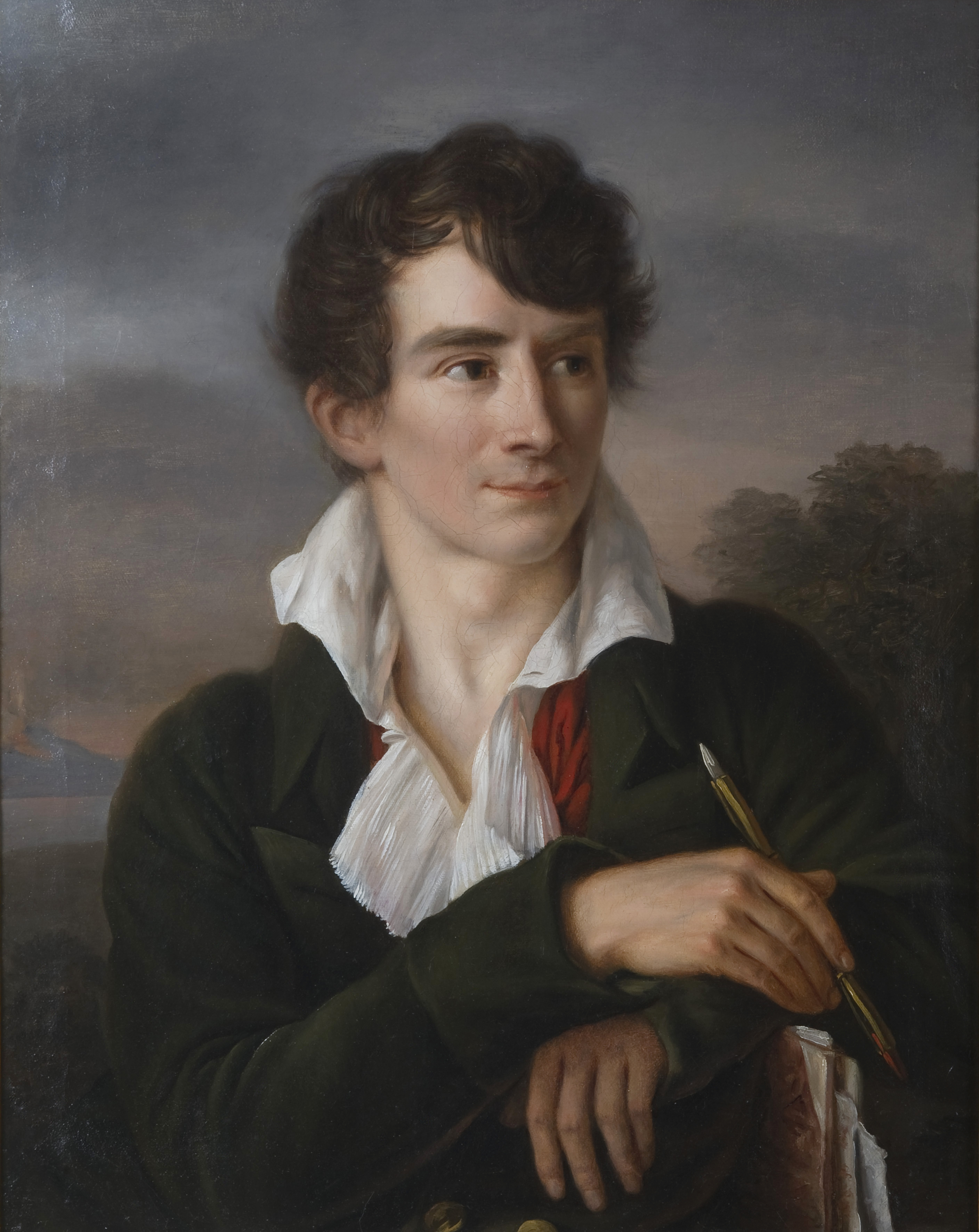
Portrait of Antoine-Denis Chaudet, the artist's husband, circa 1802 (Florence, Uffizi Gallery)

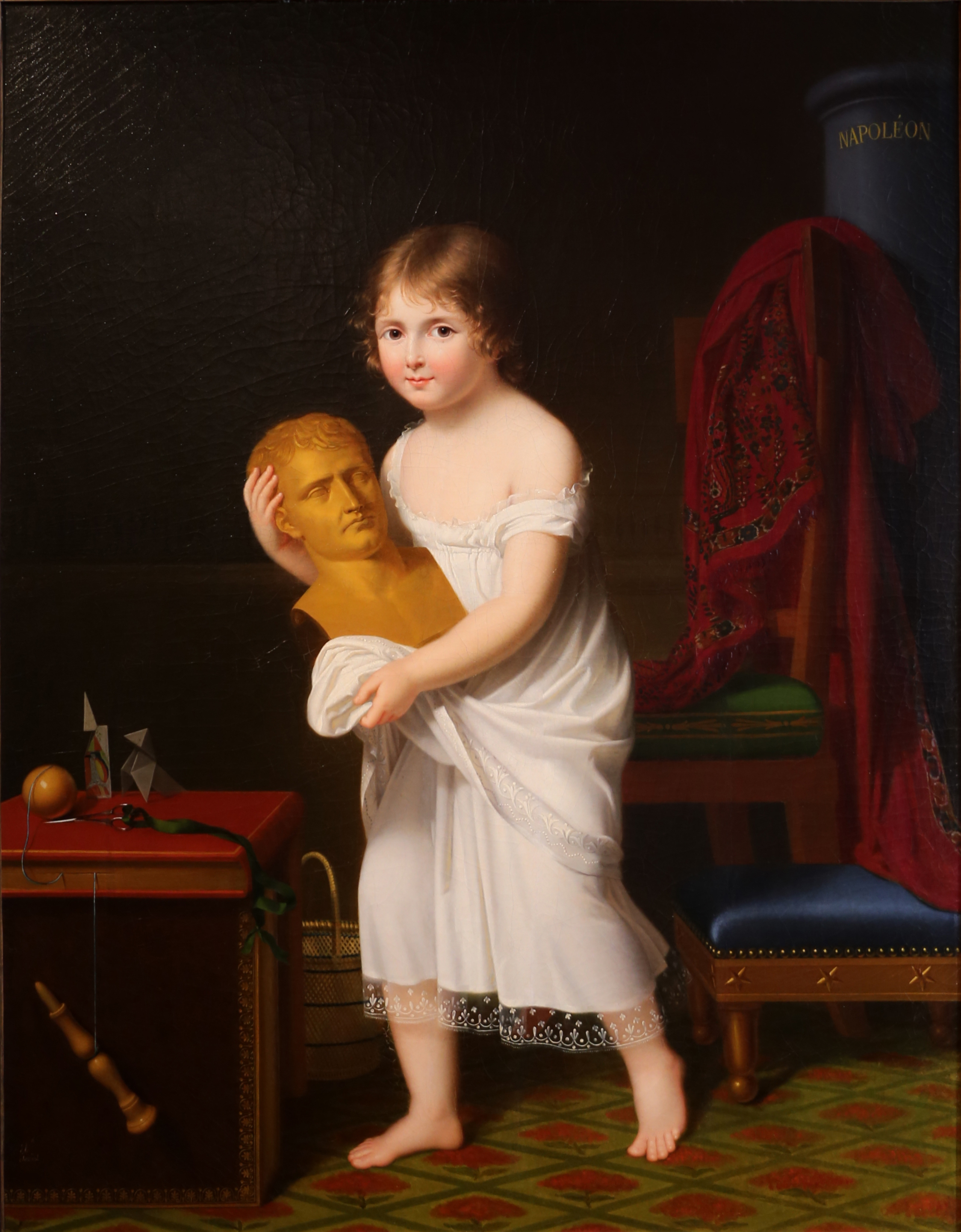
Letizia Murat carrying a bust of her oncle Napoleon, circa 1806 (Ajaccio, Musée Fesch)

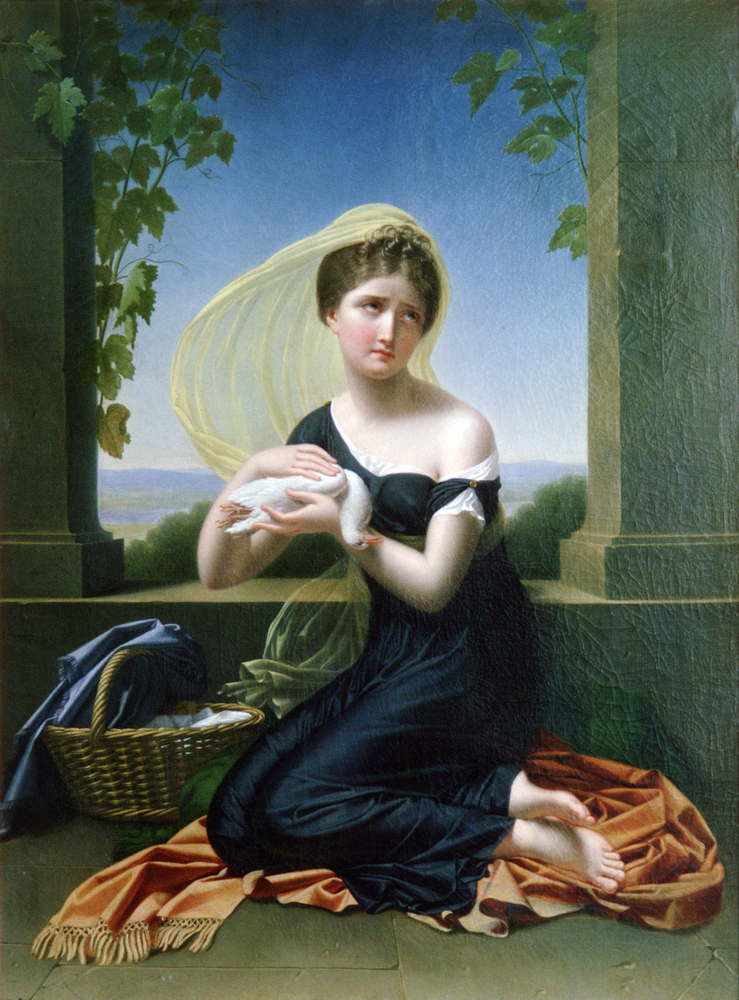
A young girl mourning her dead dove, 1808 (Musée des beaux-arts d'Arras)

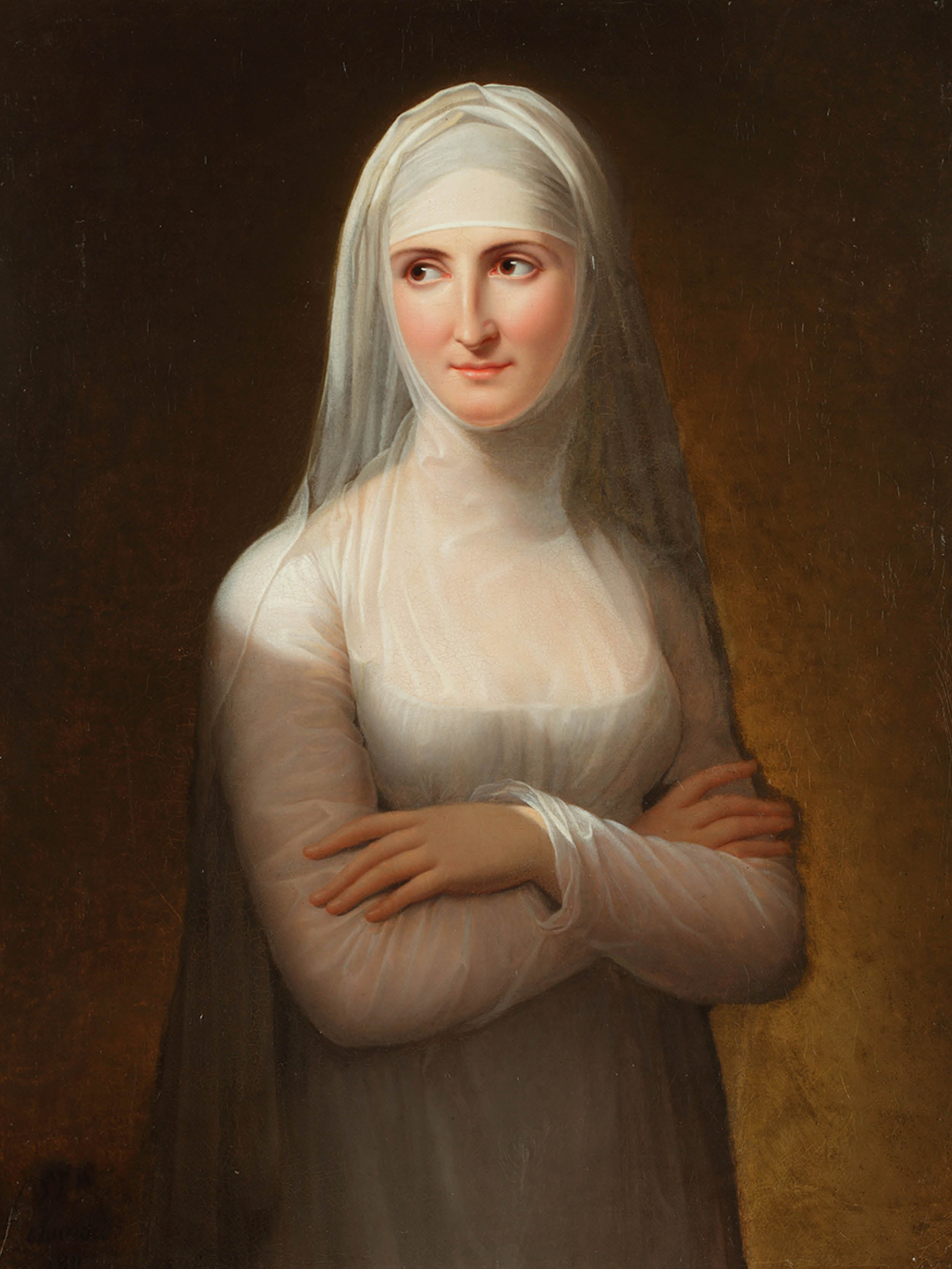
Portrait of a Lady as a Novice, 1811 (private collection)

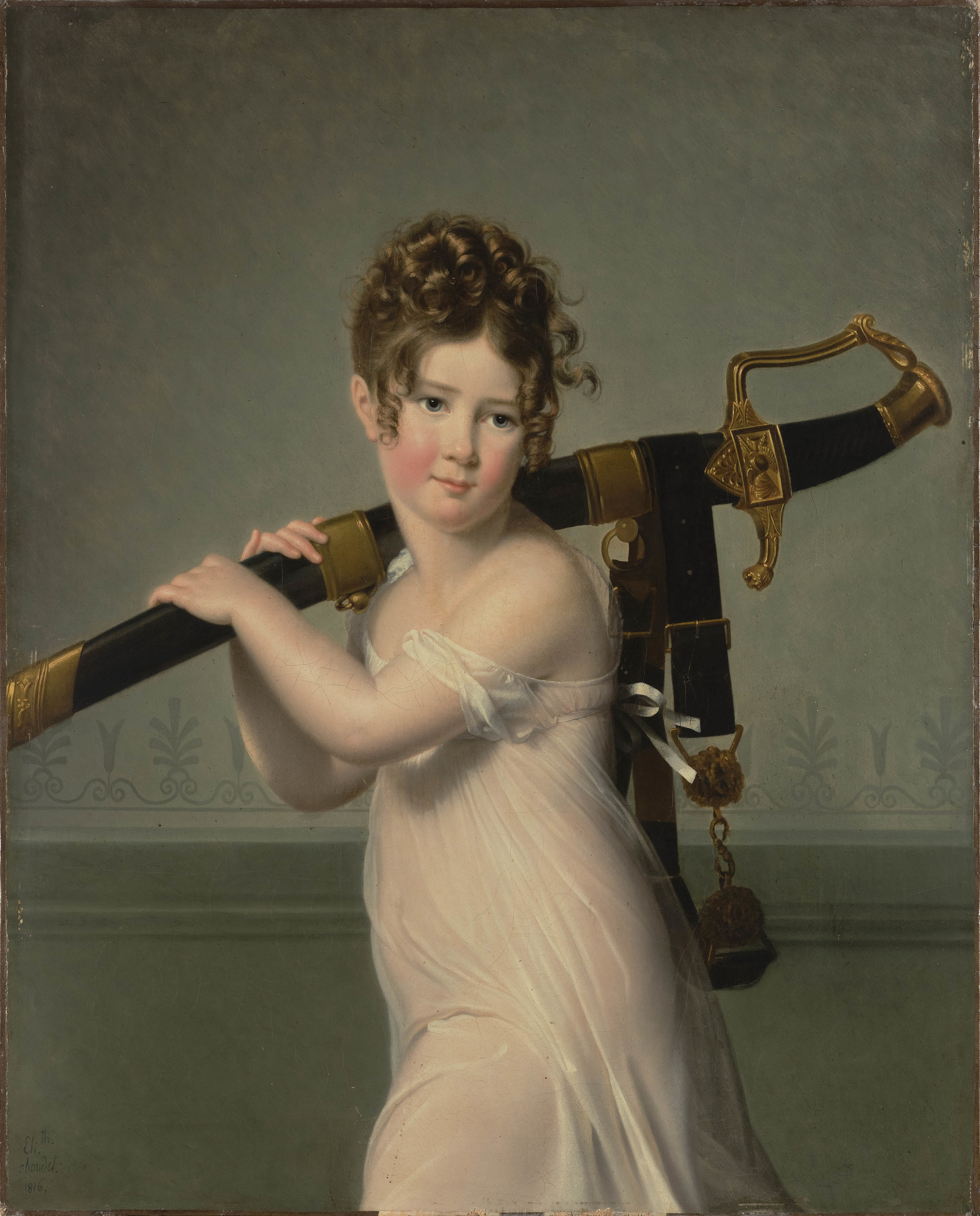
A Girl Carrying her Father's Sword, 1816, sometimes wrongly titled as Portrait of Madame Villot, née Barbier (private collection)

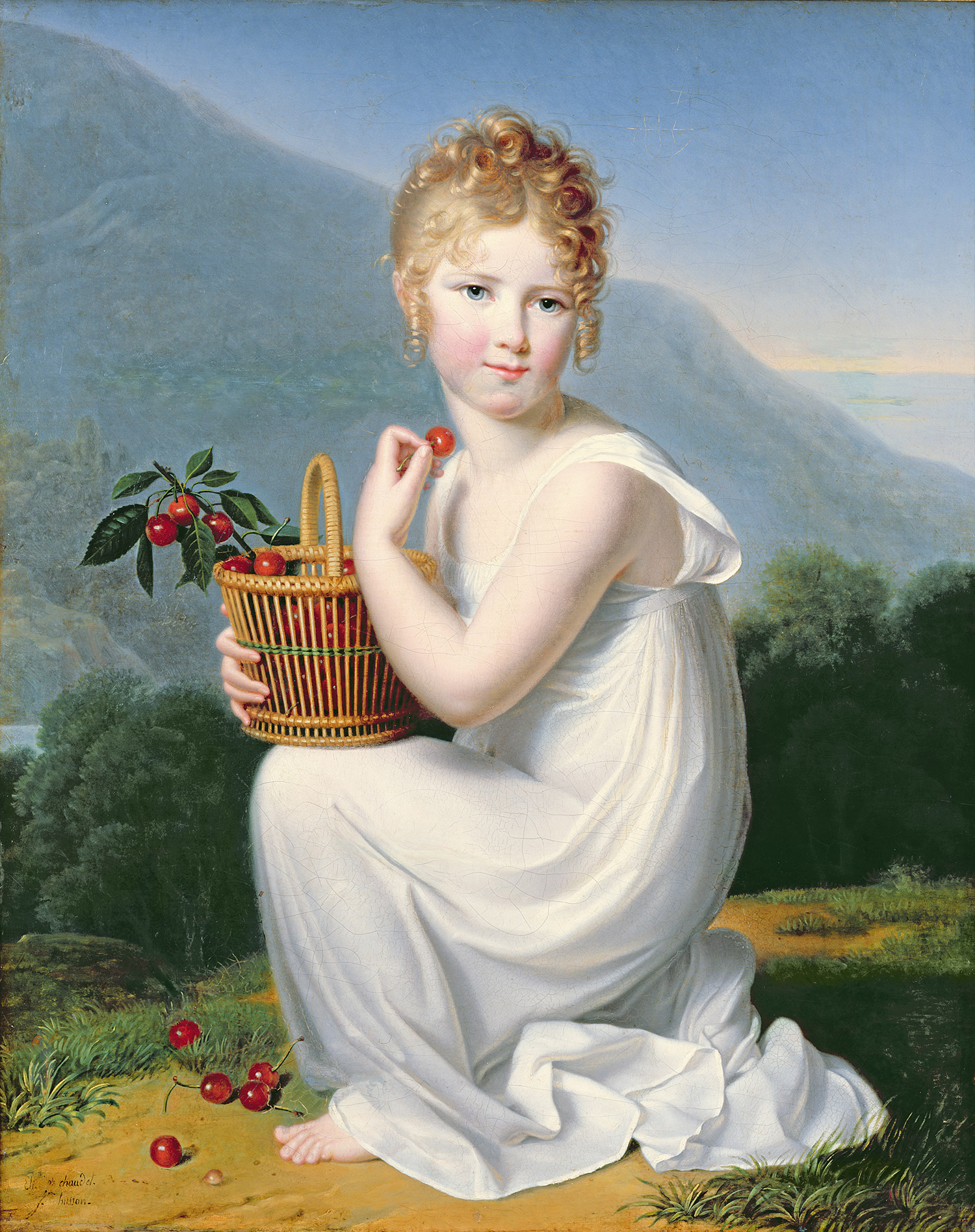
Little girl eating cherries, 1817 (Musée Marmottan Monet)

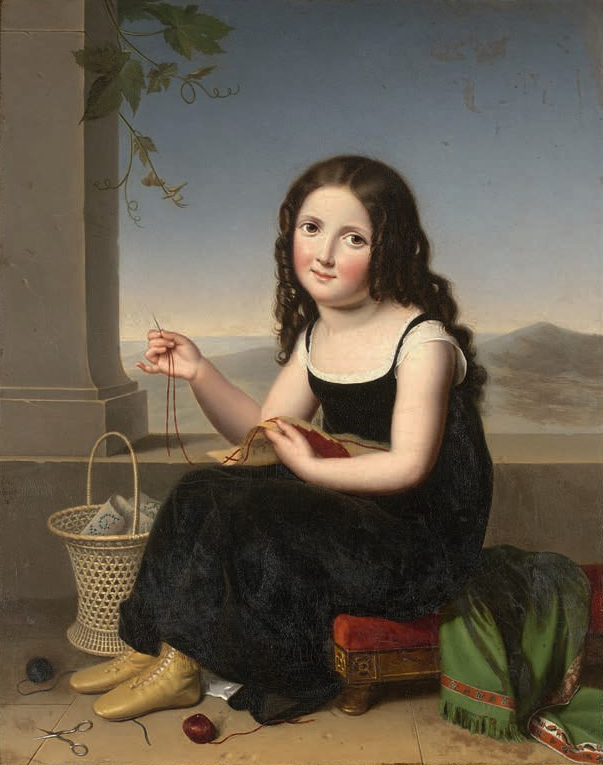
The Young Embroiderer, 1818 (private collection)

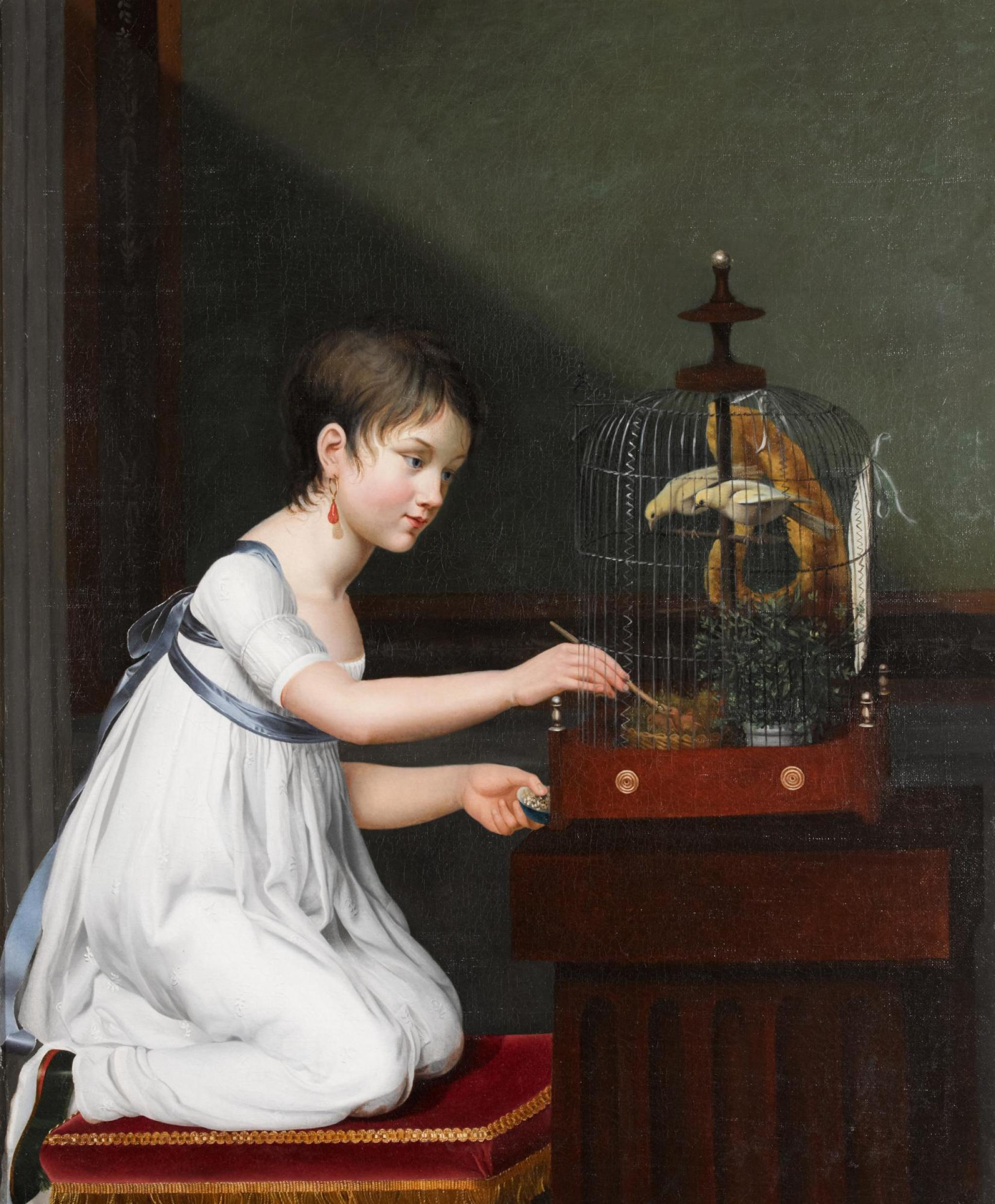
A girl feeding her birds in a birdcage, undated (private collection)
