= Marie-Élisabeth Gabiou =

French artist (1761–1811)

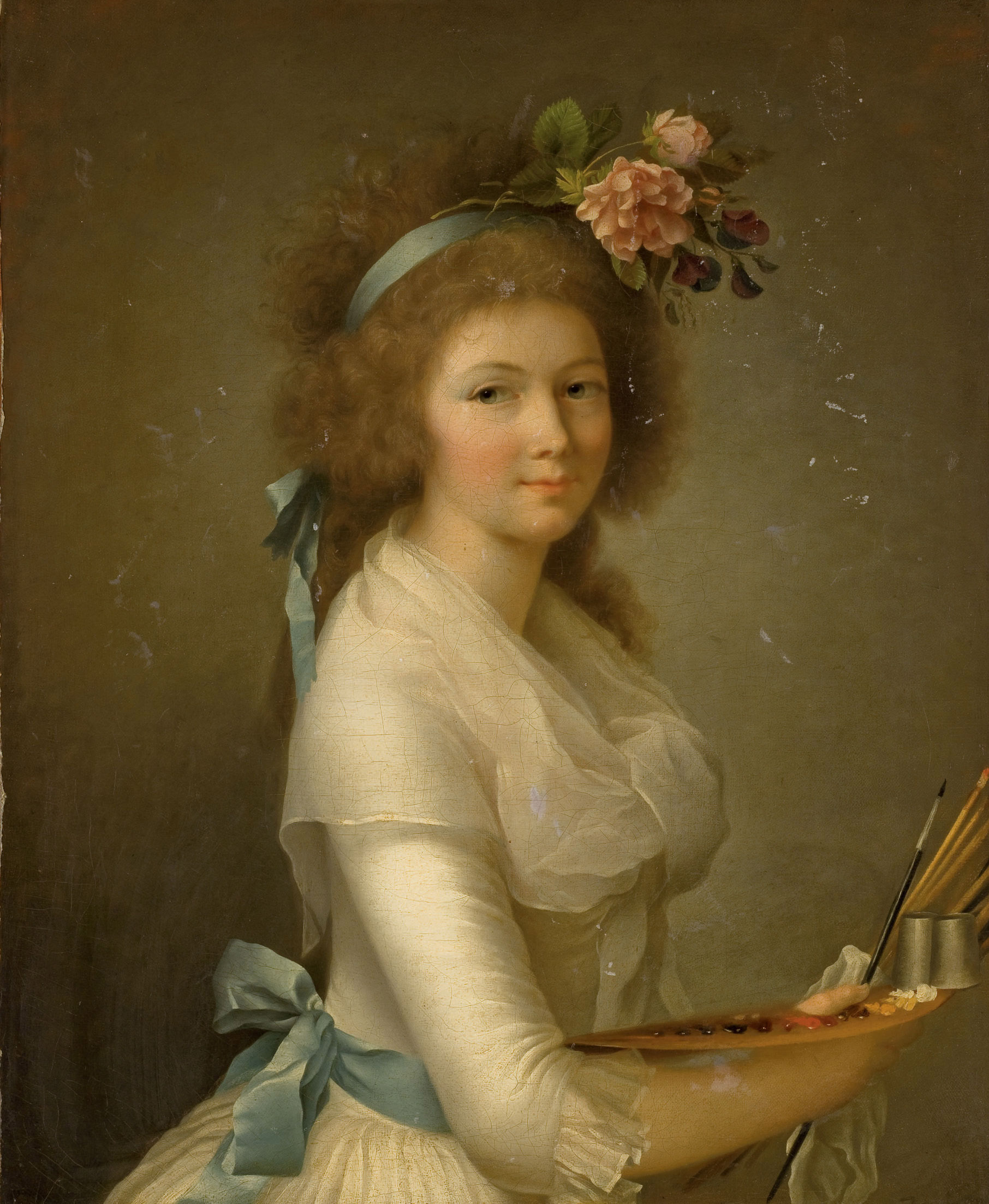
- Born: c.1761
- Died: 30 May 1811 (aged 49–50)
- Occupation: Painter

Marie-Élisabeth Gabiou, née Lemoine (c. 1761 – 30 May 1811) was a French painter.

Gabiou was the sister of painters Marie-Denise Villers and Marie-Victoire Lemoine, and was the sister-in-law and cousin of Jeanne-Elisabeth Chaudet; her husband, whom she married in 1789, was Chaudet's brother Jean-Frédéric Gabiou. Her work is usually signed "Eli Lemoine" or "Elith Lemoine", and her name is easily mistaken for that of Élisabeth Lemoine, née Bouchet. She has been described as a pastellist, though no pastels are known to exist by her hand. A supposed self-portrait appeared at auction through Christie's in 2010, realizing a price of €17,500.

== Gallery ==
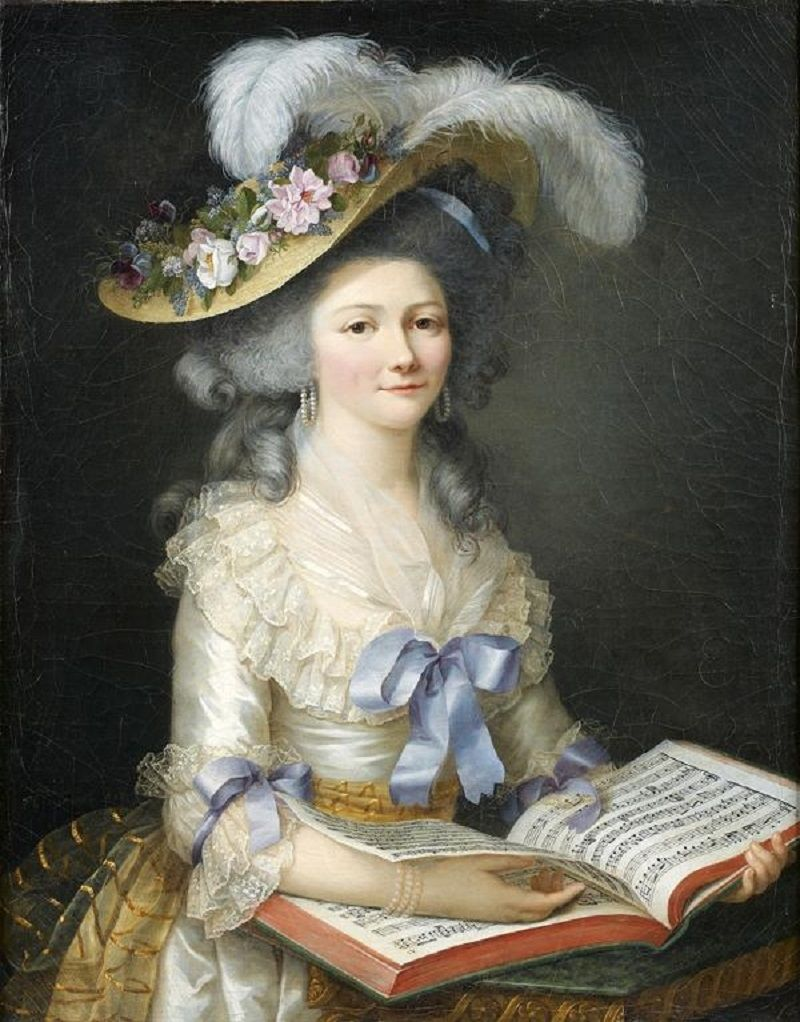
Presumed portrait of Francoise de Taulong, 1784

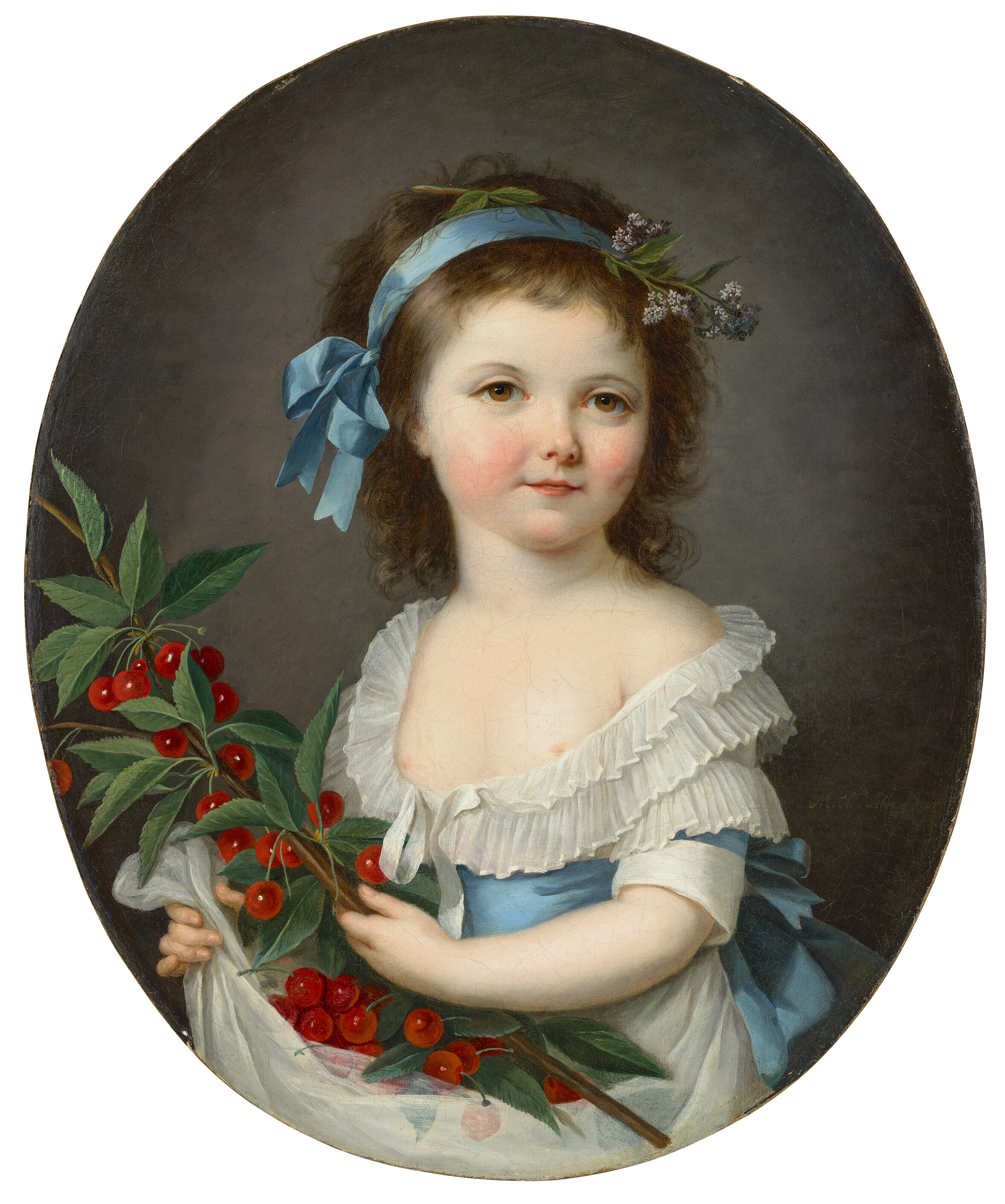
Portrait of a young girl holding a cherry branch, 1787

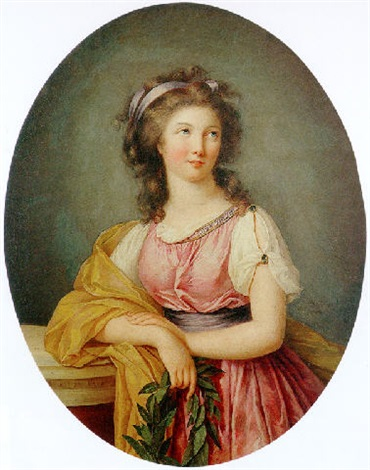
Portrait of a girl in neoclassical dress, 1789

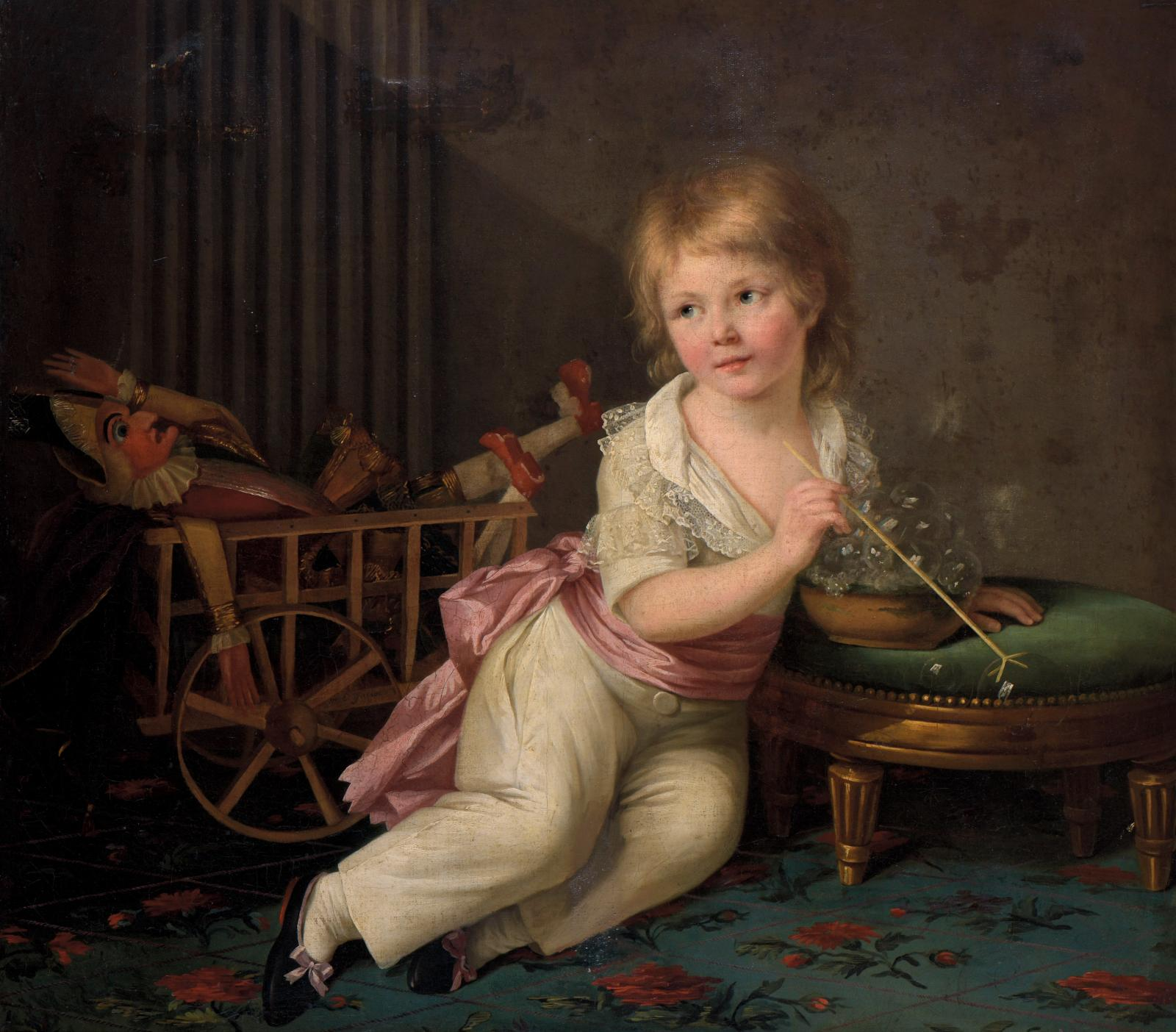
Presumed portrait of Henri Gabiou playing with soap bubbles, 1791
