= Marie-Denise Villers =

French painter (1774–1821)

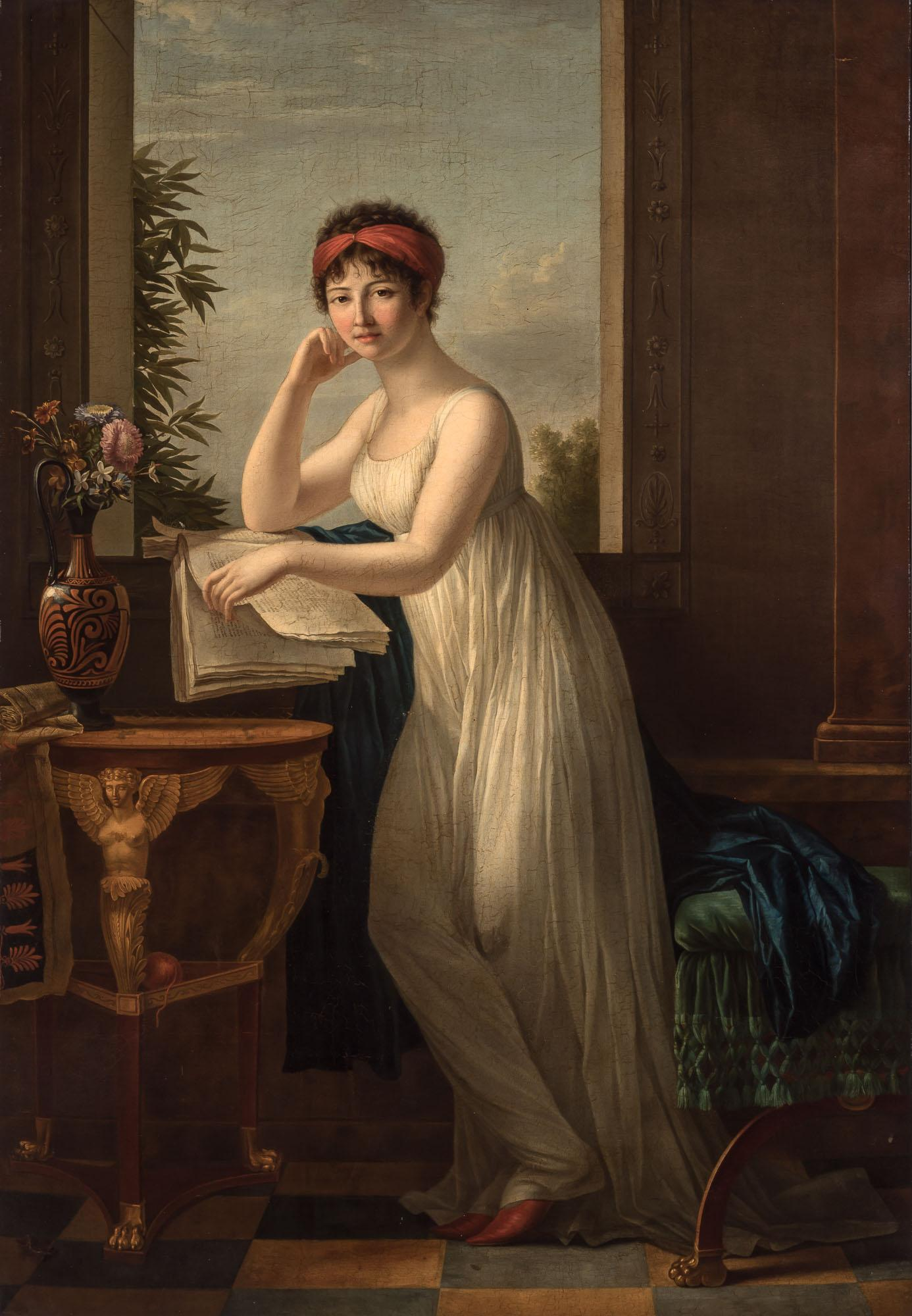
- Marie-Victoire Lemoine, A young woman leaning on the edge of a window, circa 1799 (Melbourne, National Gallery of Victoria), presumed portrait of Marie-Denise Villers painted by her sister.
- Born: Marie-Denise Lemoine; 1774; Paris, France
- Died: 19 August 1821 (aged 46–47); Paris, France
- Known for: Portrait painting
- Movement: Neoclassicism

Marie-Denise Villers (née Lemoine; 1774 – 19 August 1821) was a French painter who specialized in portrait painting.

== Life ==
Marie-Denise Lemoine was born in Paris to Charles Lemoine and Marie-Anne Rouselle. Two of her three sisters, Marie-Victoire Lemoine (1754–1820) and Marie-Élisabeth Gabiou (1755–1812), as well as distant cousin Jeanne-Elisabeth Chaudet (1767–1832), were all trained as portraitists. Within her family, Marie-Denise was known as "Nisa." The family lived on the Rue Traversière-Saint-Honoré (today Rue Molière) near the Palais Royal in the 1st arrondissement of Paris. Little is known about Marie-Denise's childhood, however it is likely that through her much older sisters and cousin she would have been introduced to the salons of Paris. It was in the Paris Salon of 1799 that she met the artist Anne-Louis Girodet-Trioson, and also began to take painting lessons with François Gérard and Jacques-Louis David.

In 1794, she married an architecture student, Michel-Jean-Maximilien Villers. Her husband supported her art, during a time when many women were forced to give up professional art work after marriage. Her life between the time of her last dated painting (1814) and her death in 1821 remains unknown.

== Career ==
She first exhibited artwork at the Paris Salon of the Year VII (1799). Villers' most famous painting, Portrait of Charlotte du Val d'Ognes (1801) has been attributed to various artists and shown under a variety of titles through its long history. Originally, the portrait was in the du Val d'Ognes family for generations, where it had been attributed to Jacques-Louis David. When the Metropolitan Museum of Art bought it in 1917, it was known as "the New York David." However, in 1951 curator Charles Stirling hypothesized that it was actually painted by a "little known woman." For decades afterwards, it was stripped of its title and artist, as per the Met's policy. In 1995, Margaret Oppenheimer successfully argued that Villers painted the work. Furthermore, art historian Anne Higonnet argued in 2011 that the work is a self-portrait.

Villers exhibited Study of a young woman sitting on a window and two other works at the Salon of 1801, followed at the Salon of 1802 by a genre painting entitled A child in its cradle and A Study of a Woman from Nature. Her last known work is a portrait of the Duchess of Angoulême, exhibited in 1814.

== Works ==
- La Peinture. Une Bacchante endormie, 1799. (Painting. A Bacchante sleeping)
- Étude d'une jeune femme assise sur une fenêtre, 1800–1801. (Study of a young woman sitting on a window)
- Portrait of Charlotte du Val d'Ognes (attribution), previously known as Young woman drawing, New York, Metropolitan Museum of Art, 1801.
- Étude d'une femme à sa toilette. portrait, 1801. (Study of a woman at her toilet.)
- "Une étude de femme d'après nature," Presumed Portrait of Madame Soustras, Paris, Louvre Museum, 1802
- Un enfant dans son berceau, entrainé par les eaux de l'inondation du mois de Nivôse an X, 1802. (A child in its cradle, driven by the flood waters of the month X year Nivôse)
- Un enfant dans son berceau, entrainé par les eaux de l'inondation du mois de Nivôse an X, taille réduite de l'œuvre de 1802, 1810. (A child in its cradle, driven by the flood waters of the month Nivôse year X)
- Une petite fille blonde, tenant une corbeille de jonc remplie de fleurs; before 1813. (A little blonde girl holding a basket filled with flowers ring)
- Portrait de la duchesse d'Angoulême, 1814. (Portrait of the Duchess of Angoulême)

== Gallery ==
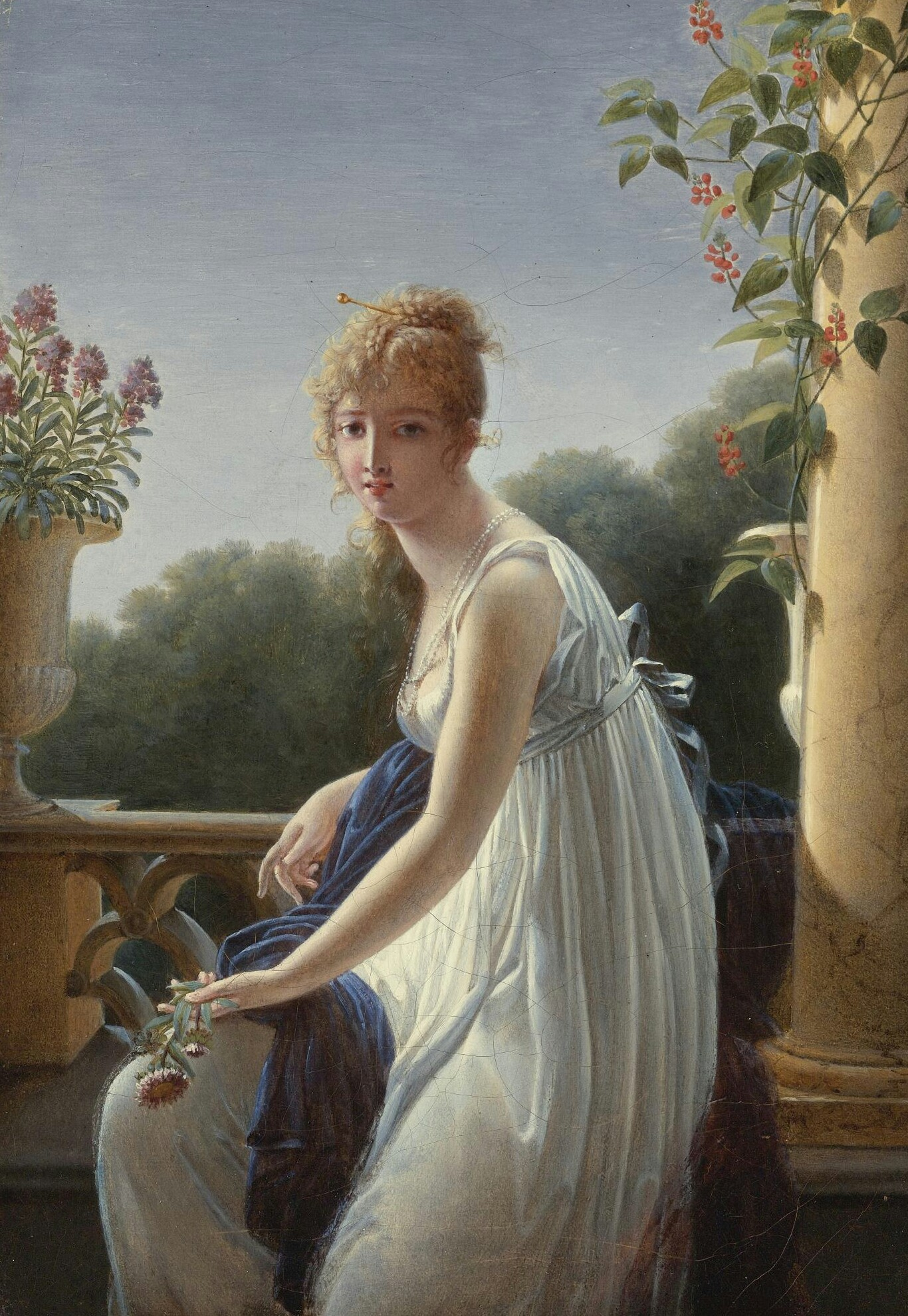
A Young Woman Seated by a Window, replica or modello of the painting exhibited at the Salon of 1801

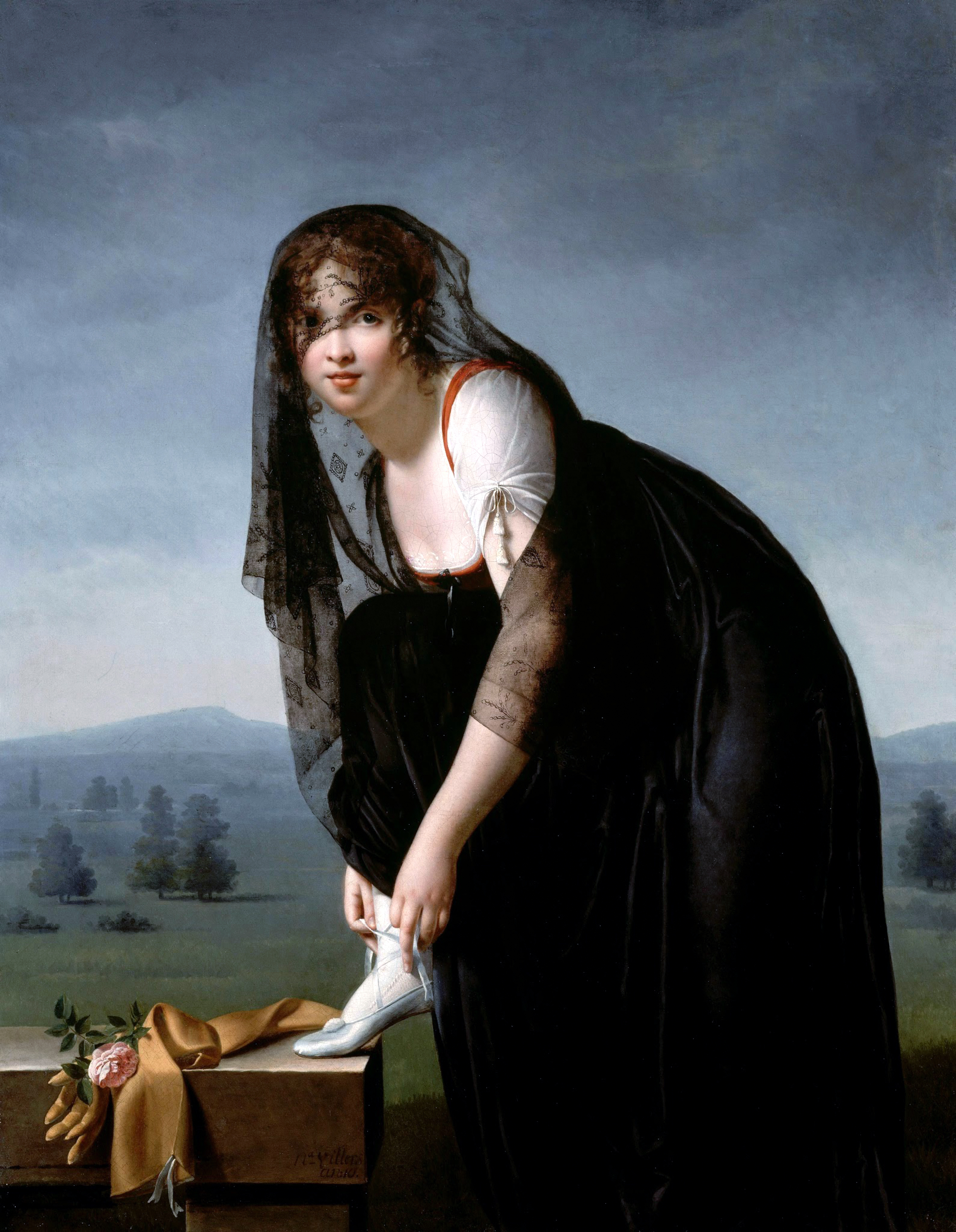
Une étude de femme d'après nature, Salon of 1802, musée du Louvre

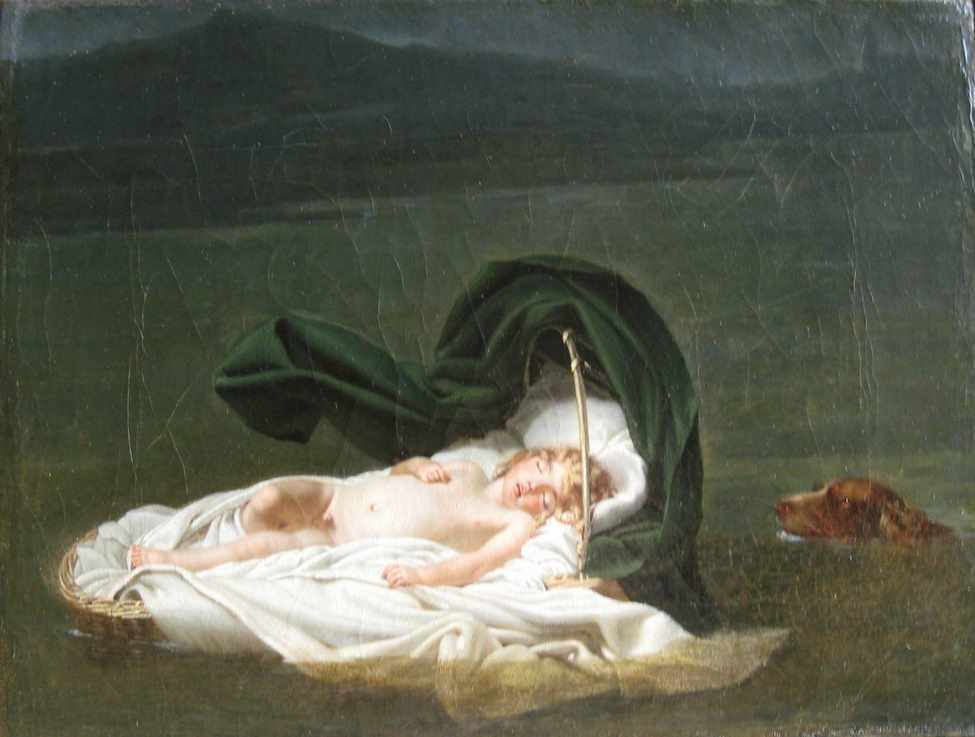
A child in his cradle, carried away by the waters of the flood of the month of Nivôse year, 1810, replica of the painting exhibited at the Salon of 1802

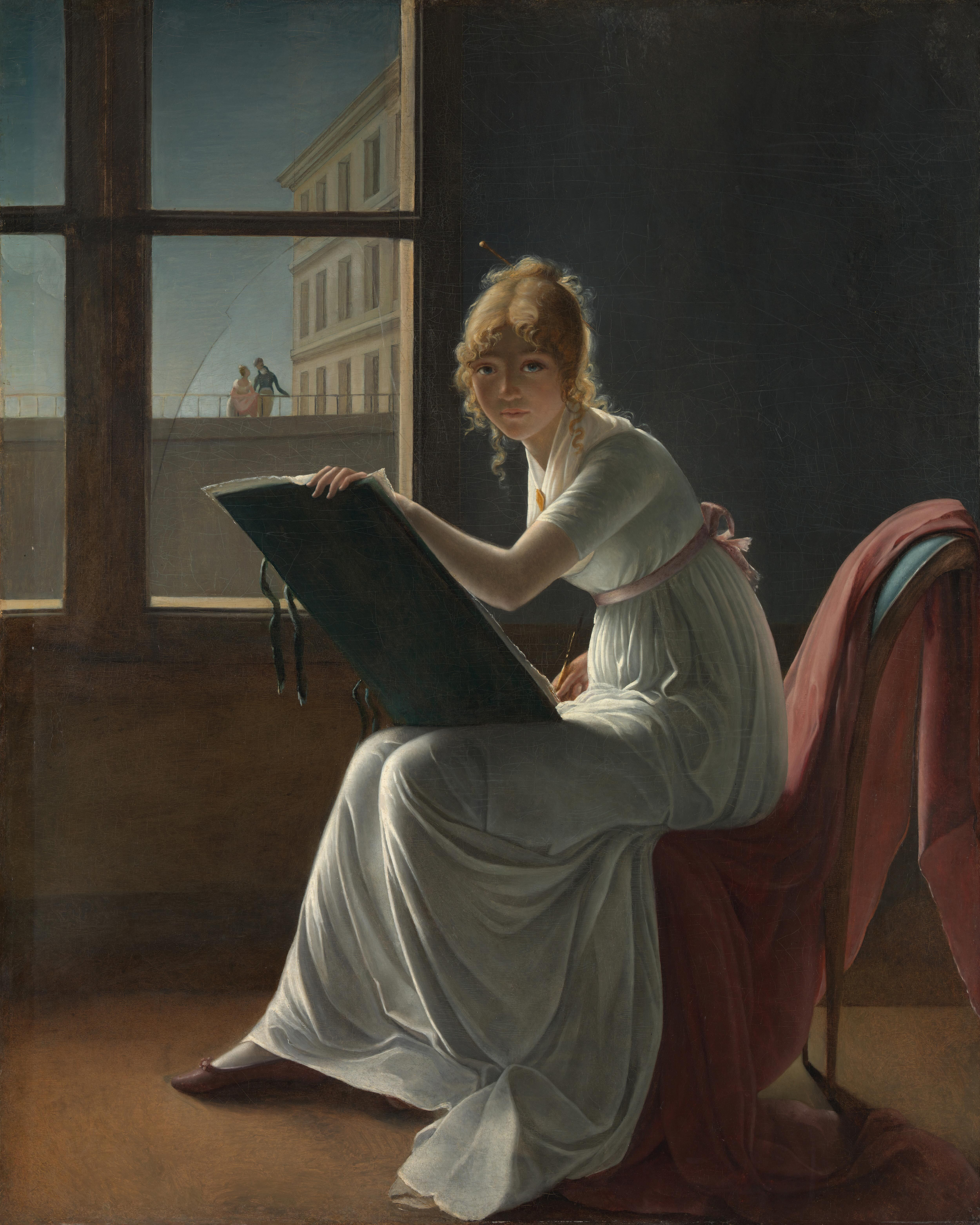
Portrait of Charlotte du Val d'Ognes (attribution), 1801, oil on canvas, Metropolitan Museum of Art, New York City
