= Death on the Pale Horse =

Painting by Benjamin West

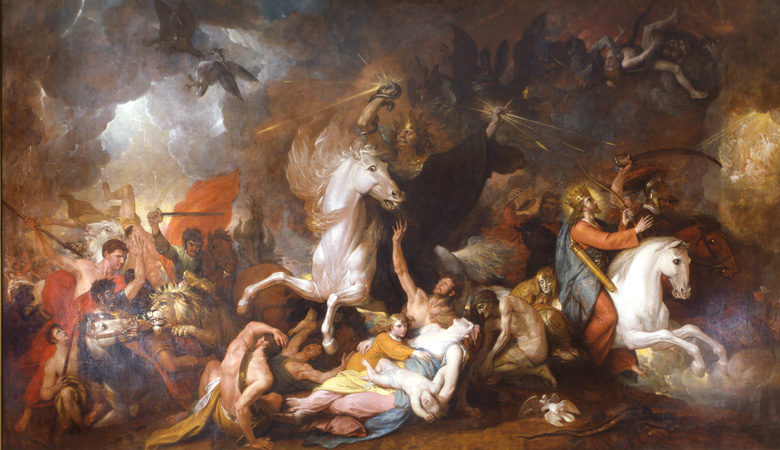
- Artist: Benjamin West
- Year: 1817
- Location: Pennsylvania Academy of the Fine Arts, Philadelphia

Death on the Pale Horse is the title of three different versions of a work by Benjamin West. The first of these is a large drawing from 1783, which has been in the collection of the Royal Academy of Art in London since 1784. The second version is a painting from 1796, now in the Detroit Institute of Art. The third version is a 25-foot wide painting that West exhibited in 1817 in a special gallery on the street of Pall Mall, where he charged admission for visitors who wished to see it. This version was acquired by the Pennsylvania Academy of the Fine Arts in Philadelphia in 1835. All three versions of Death on the Pale Horse were inspired by apocalyptic imagery from the Book of Revelation. They are significant examples of the Sublime in British painting.

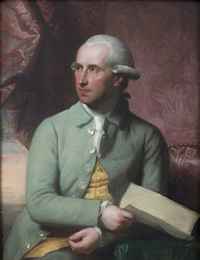
Benjamin West

== Background ==
West was a British-American painter, President of the Royal Academy of Arts, and an official painter at the Court of St. James. He had risen to prominence through works such as The Death of General Wolfe, The Departure of Regulus, and Agrippina Landing at Brundisium with the Ashes of Germanicus, which date from the decisive early years of his career between 1765 and 1772.

== Inspiration ==
The subject of Death on the Pale Horse comes from the first eight verses of the sixth chapter of The Revelation of St. John the Divine (also known as the Apocalypse, the final book of the New Testament). West's interest in New Testament subjects was influenced by the German-born Moravian artist, John Valentine Haidt. Additionally, American educator William Smith claims to have encouraged West toward spiritual pursuits and introduced him to the knowledge of "The Ancients." At the end of the eighteenth century, West's patron William Beckford encouraged his depiction of apocalyptic subject matter.

Death on the Pale Horse differs from West's earlier paintings in the Neoclassical style, which celebrated heroic deeds. Various reasons have been cited for the change. One is a general change in taste at the time, including the growing interest in the sublime and the Gothick. West's turn to a biblical subject may also reflect the renewed piety of the 19th century.

John Hamilton Mortimer's depiction of the same subject was exhibited at the Society of Artists in 1775 and was a predecessor for West's work. Albrecht Dürer's wood engraving of The Four Horsemen was also an iconographic precedent for the horse. Similarities between the wood engraving and the later paintings suggest that both Mortimer and West had seen it.

== First version ==
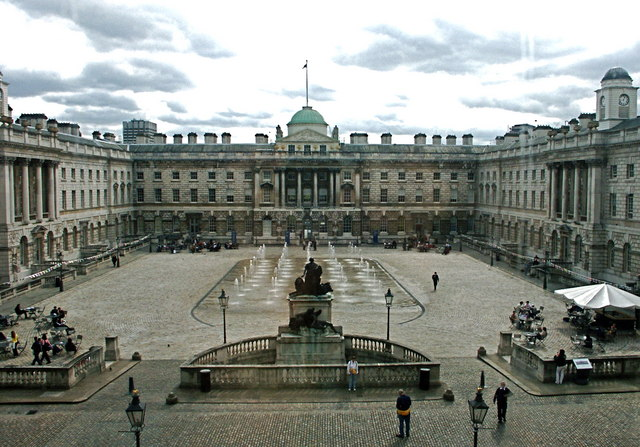
Somerset House, home of the Royal Academy of Arts in 1784

Originally titled The Triumph of Death, the first version was executed in 1783 and exhibited in the Royal Academy in 1784. West, inspired by Mortimer's Death on a Pale Horse, drafted a picture of the same subject. However, he took Mortimer's more personal and intimate view of the subject into an extravagant spectacle reminiscent of the art of the Rubens. The art historian Allen Staley describes this work as the beginning of West's departure from "earlier paintings of classical subjects celebrating virtuous and heroic human behavior." West was one of the several artists, including James Barry and Henry Fuseli, who in the 1770s turned away from Neoclassicism and began exploring the sublime. But West's biographer, John Galt, argued that West's new direction involved more than artistic fashion, and instead anticipates "the renewed piety of the 19th century."

== Second version ==
This painting was exhibited at the Royal Academy of Arts in 1796 under the title The opening of the four seals (vide Revelation); a sketch for His Majesty's Chapel, Windsor. West then took advantage of the Peace of Amiens in 1802 and exhibited this version at the Paris Salon of 1802, where it received positive reviews.

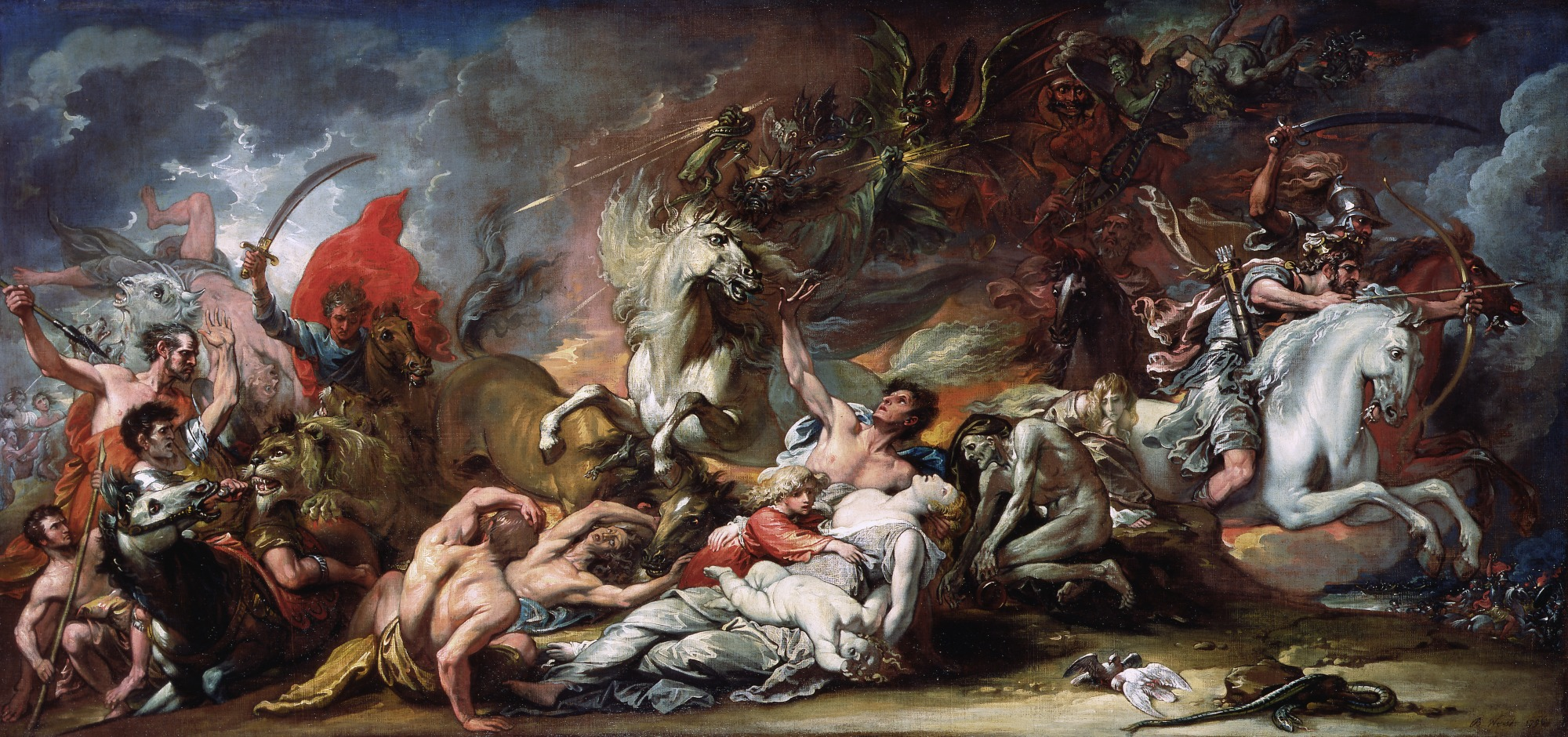
Benjamin West - Death on the Pale Horse (Second version, Detroit Institute of arts); Oil on canvas: 59.5 x 128.5 cm.

West's approach to the subject is similar to his earlier drawing. The central figure of the painting is Death, which is riding a pale horse, and is surrounded by other apocalyptic creatures." The proposed painting for the chapel at Windsor was expected to be part of a series illustrating biblical passages from the Book of Genesis through the Book of Revelation.

The project was commissioned by King George III, who had been a supporter of West since 1768. This Windsor chapel series was supposed to be the King's most generous act of patronage. West contributed eighteen large works and various small paintings for the chapel before he was told in 1801 to cease work on the project. The fact that the project was never completed makes it difficult to determine the place that Death on the Pale Horse was meant to occupy in the series.

== Third version ==
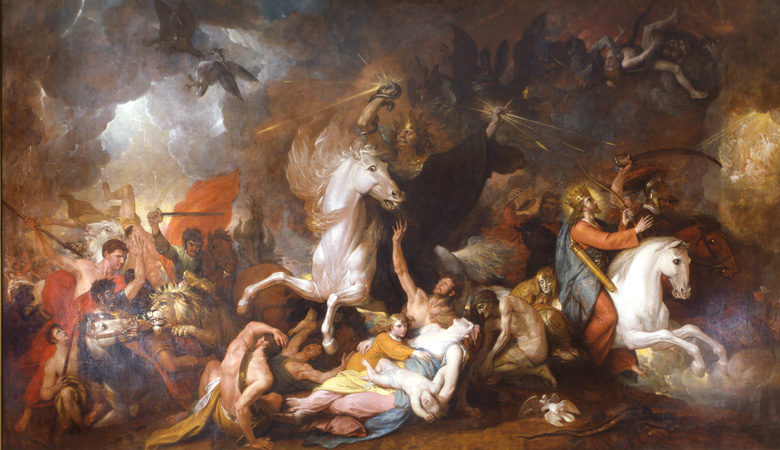
Death on the Pale Horse, third version

The final version of this painting has always been referred as Death on the Pale Horse, and it is considered the last major painting in West's long career. Measuring 447.0 x 764.5 cm, it is significantly larger than the previous two versions. In this final version, West changed the rider on the rightmost horse from a warrior to a more Christ-like figure, gazing toward the sky. The alteration gave the painting a hint of possible salvation.

== Critics ==
The first version received little response from critics at the exhibition in the Royal Arts Academy.

The second version was widely praised and admired by critics at the time. It received a particularly positive response in Paris, where a favorable review appeared in the Journal des arts. Jacques-Louis David dismissed it as "a caricature of Rubens," but Napoleon Bonaparte was said to admire it. King George III, however, reportedly called the painting a "Bedlamite scene," perhaps in reference to his personal experience with mental illness.

The final version had mixed critical opinions as well. A writer in Mirror Art admired the "mysterious gloom" of the painting, describing it as "a picture that strikes at first sight." New York and Boston audiences were less enthusiastic.

== Effect ==
Scholars have suggested that Death on the Pale Horse contributed to the rise of French Romanticism following its exhibition in Paris. Others argue that the painting merely affirmed what French artists were already starting to do.

The painting influenced William Beckford's interest in paintings depicting scenes from the Book of Revelation, which he commissioned for Fonthill Abbey, an enormous monument of Gothic Revival architecture. Years later, Beckford continued buying apocalyptic pictures, including Francis Danby's An Attempt to Illustrate the Opening of the Sixth Seal, currently at the National Gallery of Ireland, Dublin. Much later, this would be the inspiration for the painting titled The Great Day of His Wrath (Tate, London), painted by John Martin, on the same chapter of the Revelation.

Other English artists took inspiration from West's work. One was Philip James de Loutherbourg, who painted The Opening of the Second Seal (Tate Gallery, London), using the pale white horse in The Death of the Pale Horse as a clear model. West's apocalyptic subjects also resemble William Blake's watercolors based on the Book of Revelation.

After West's death in 1820, The Annual Register commented that the third version (1817) could "justly be considered as one of the finest productions of modern art." When the painting arrived in New York in 1836, the Weekly Register took note, saying: ""[T]his picture has long been regarded as the chef d'oeuvre of our distinguished countryman. As Americans we feel proud that this great work of art is permanently to remain in this country, and as Philadelphians, we are gratified that such a treasure has been added to the already large and valuable collection of works of arts belonging to one of our public institutions."

== Symbolism ==
Allen Staley argues that West's message is that man's fate is "to be impotent and pathetic against the forces over which he has no control." The scene is also seen as an evocation of Edmund Burke's ideas on the sublime.
