= Salon of 1802 =

1802 art exhibition in Paris

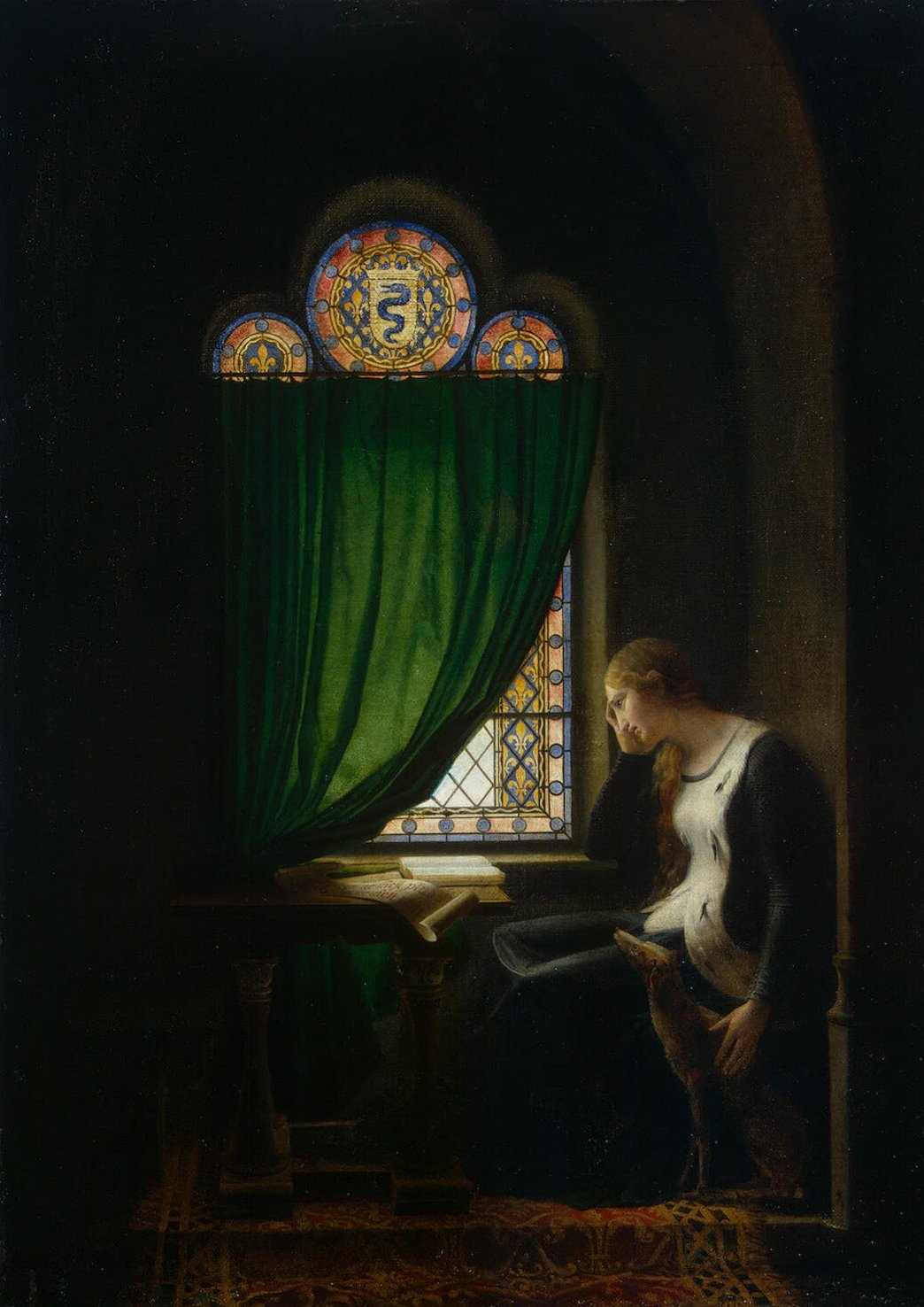
Valentine of Milan Mourning Her Husband the Duke of Orléans by Fleury François Richard. A pioneering work in the Romantic Troubadour style

The Salon of 1802 was an art exhibition held at the Louvre in Paris during the era of the French Consulate. It was held the same year as the Treaty of Amiens that ended the French Revolutionary Wars. Staged by the former Académie Royale it featured paintings and sculptures and lasted from 2 September to 16 November 1802. Due to the peace between France and the United Kingdom, it was the only year between 1793 and 1814 when British visitors could travel to visit the Salon. The Anglo-American painter and President of the Royal Academy Benjamin West exhibited his Death on the Pale Horse at the Salon. The peace was short-lived, followed by the outbreak of the Napoleonic Wars the following year. The next exhibition was the Salon of 1804, held the year Napoleon declared himself emperor.

It was the first Salon for Jean Auguste Dominique Ingres the winner of the Prix de Rome the previous the year, who submitted a portrait of a woman. Anne-Louis Girodet de Roussy-Trioson exhibited Ossian Receiving the Ghosts of French Heroes, which he dedicated to the First Consul Napoleon Bonaparte. Henri-Pierre Danloux displayed his Scene from the Deluge, which he had painted while in England. The Neoclassical Phaedra and Hippolytus by Pierre-Narcisse Guérin was acquired by the government for 24,000 Francs. With his Valentine of Milan Mourning her Husband the Duke of Orléans Fleury François Richard, of the Lyon School, arguably exhibited the first Troubadour style painting. The genre would become a popular one in France during the nineteenth century.

Around forty women exhibited at the Salon, a large jump from the three who had featured at the Salon of 1783 before the French Revolution.

== Gallery ==
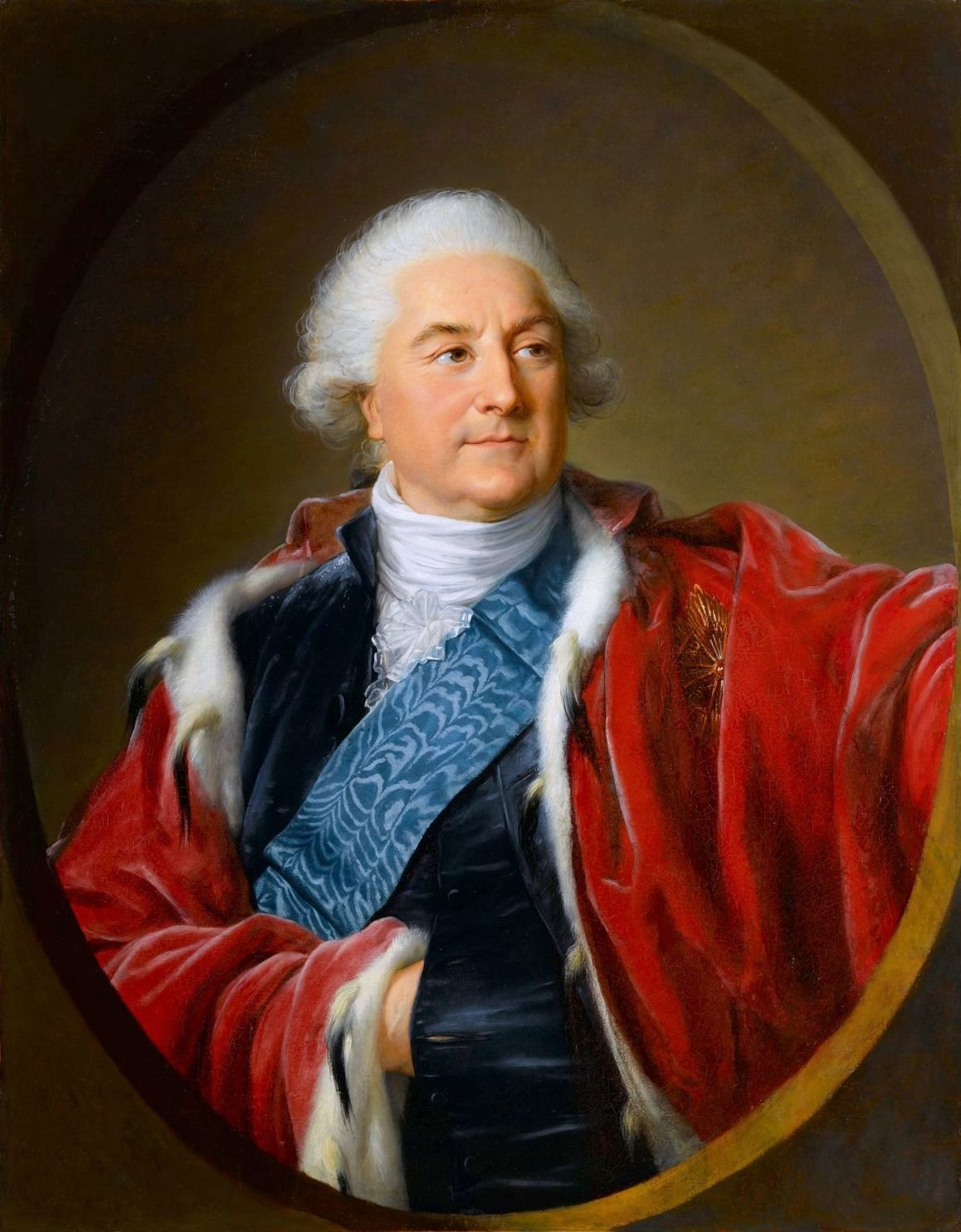
Portrait of Stanisław August Poniatowski by Élisabeth Vigée Le Brun

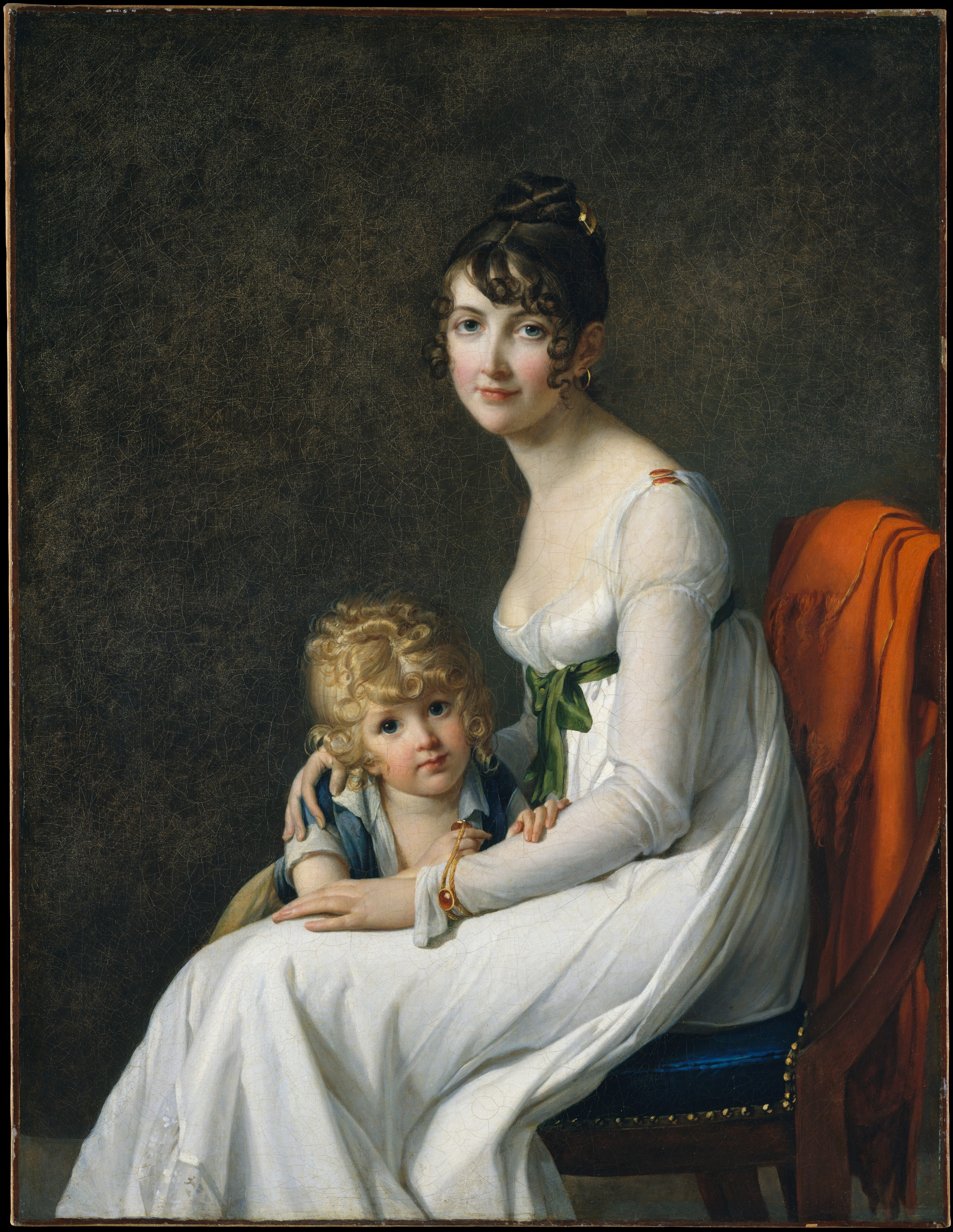
Madame Philippe Panon Desbassayns de Richemont and Her Son Eugène by Marie-Guillemine Benoist

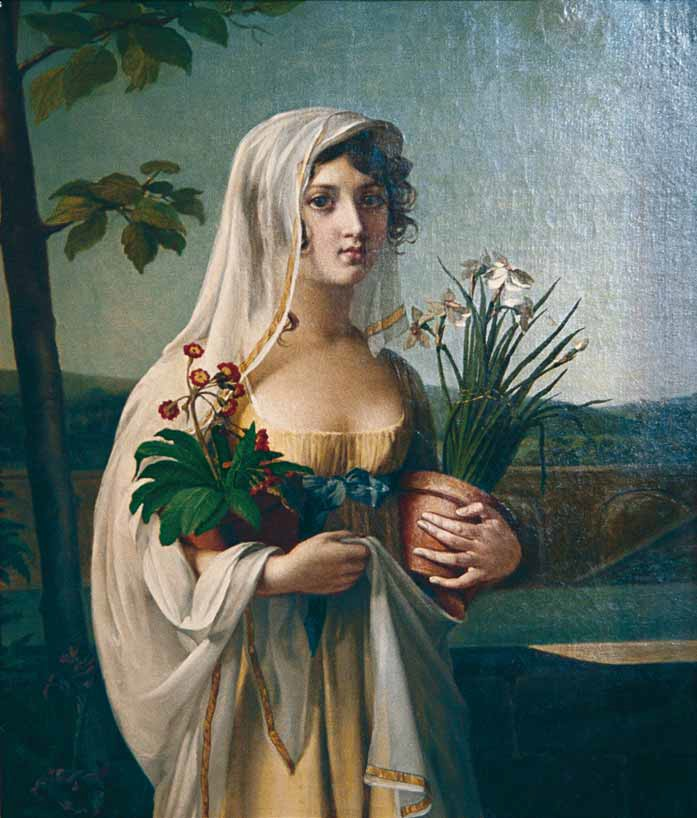
Portrait of a young lady with two vases of flowers by Marie-Guillemine Benoist

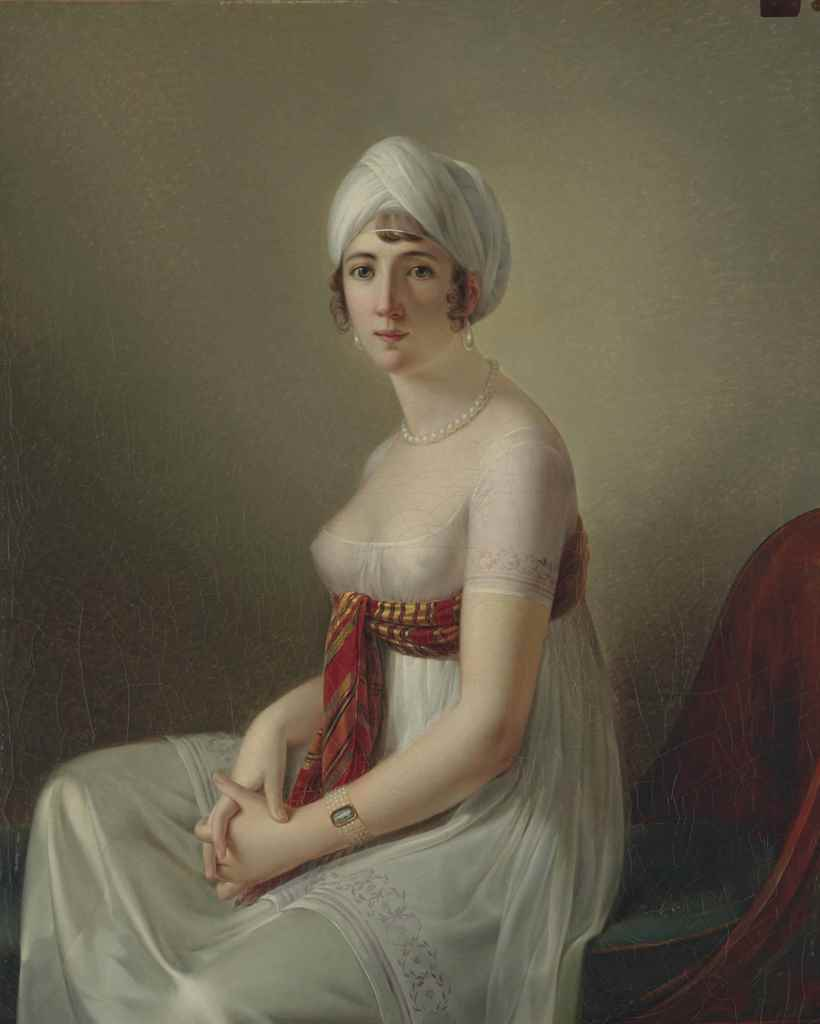
Portrait of Augustine Sophie Le Prince, the Artist's Wife by François Kinson

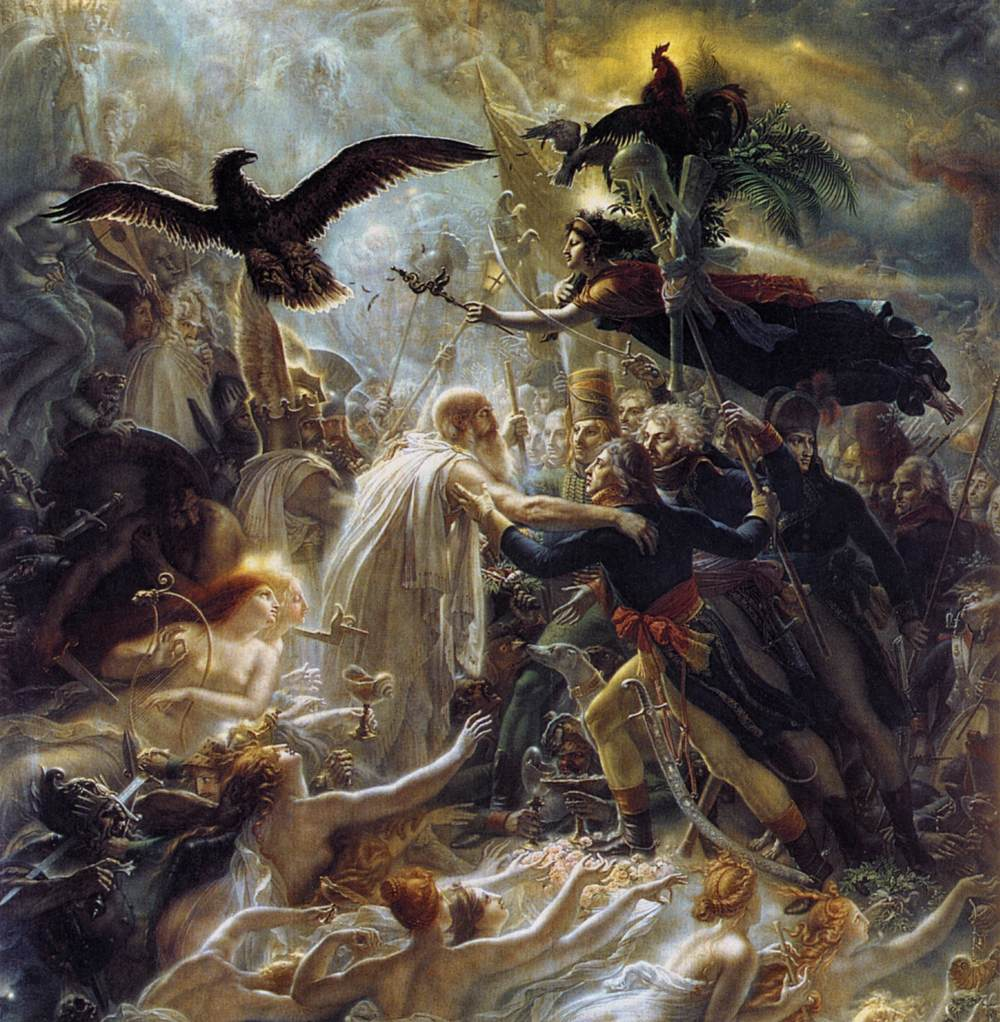
Ossian Receiving the Ghosts of French Heroes by Anne-Louis Girodet de Roussy-Trioson

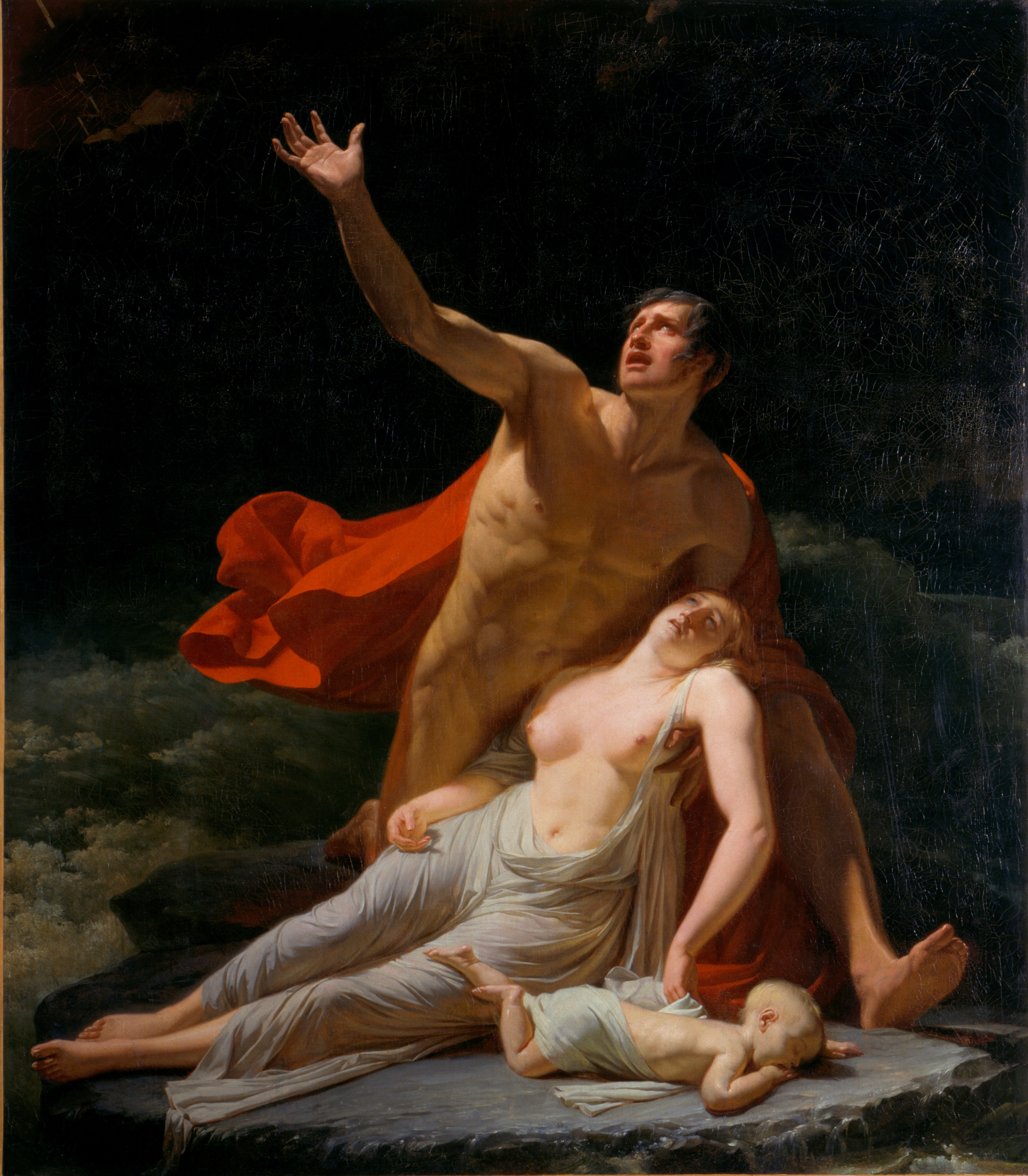
Épisode du Déluge by Henri-Pierre Danloux

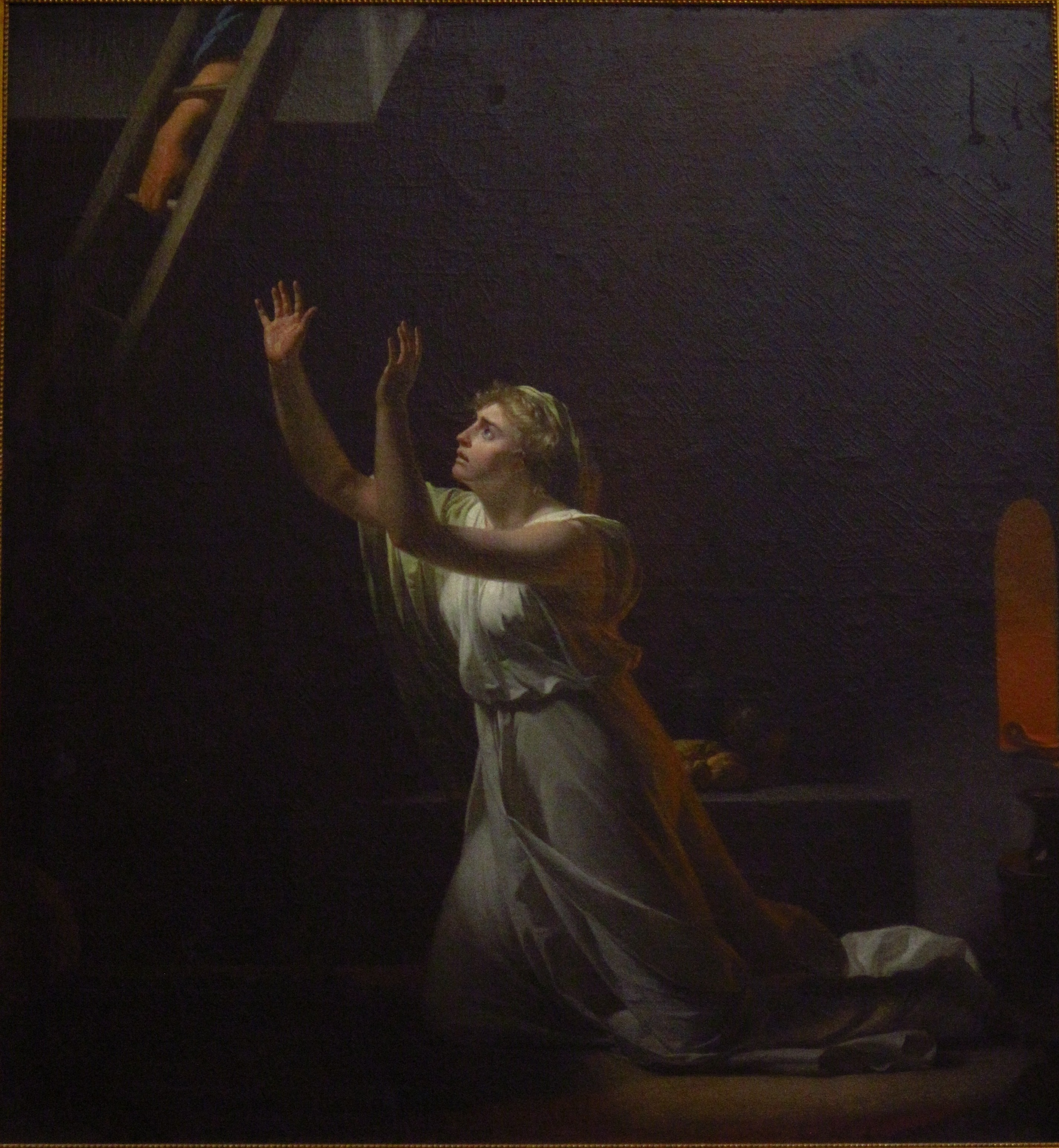
Le Supplice d'une Vestale by Henri-Pierre Danloux

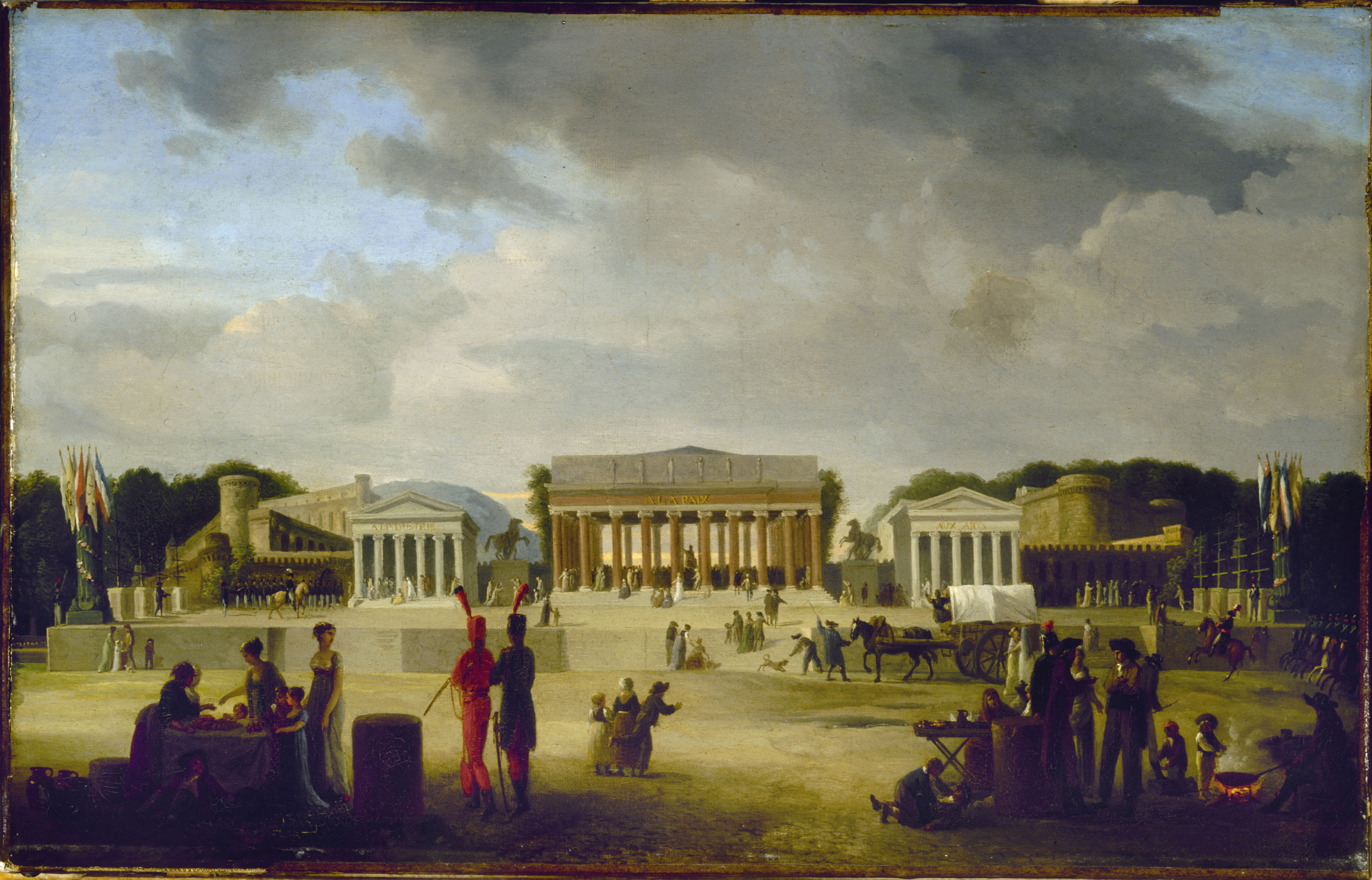
View of the Large Theatre Built on the Place de la Concorde for the Peace Festival, 18 Brumaire, Year X by Jean-Baptiste Cazin

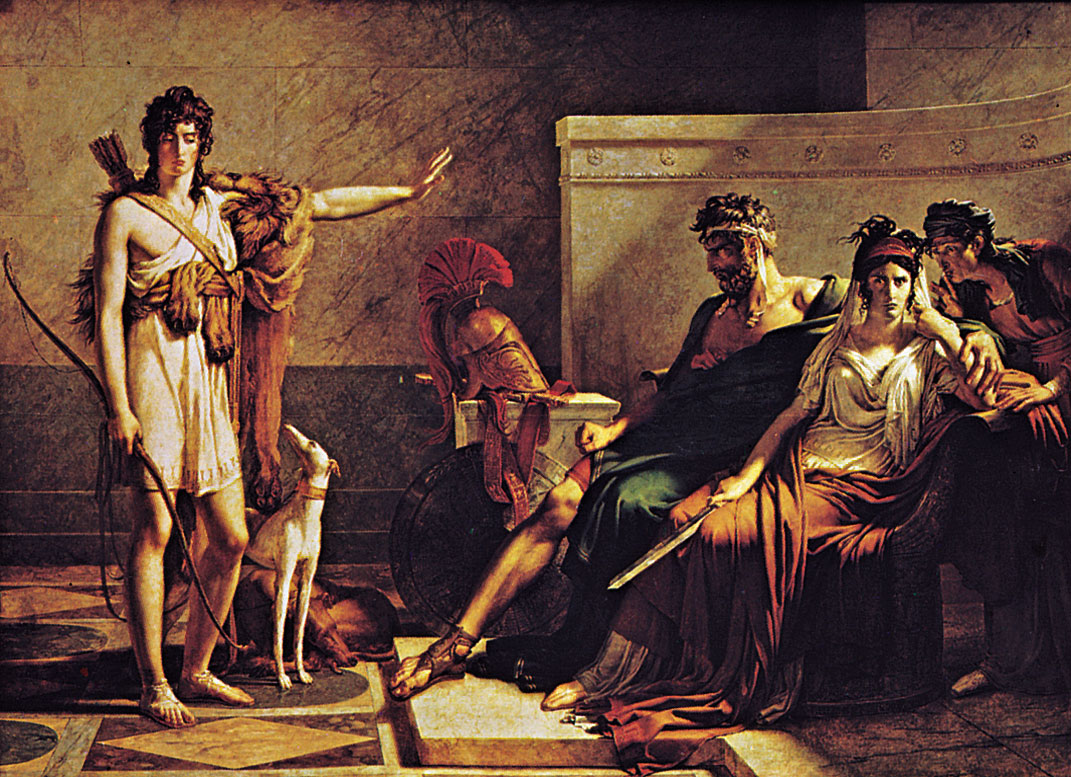
Phaedra and Hippolytus by Pierre-Narcisse Guérin

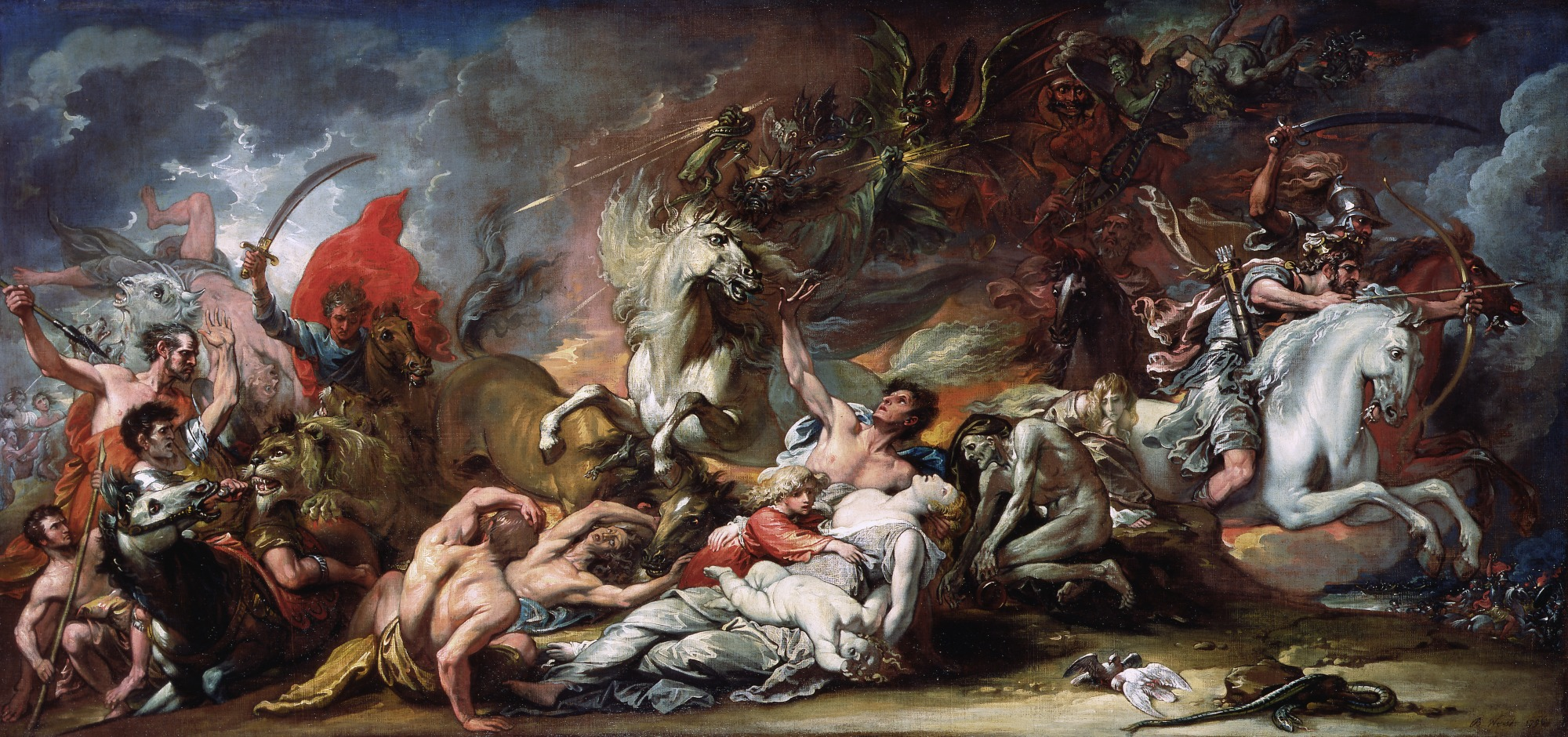
Death on the Pale Horse by Benjamin West

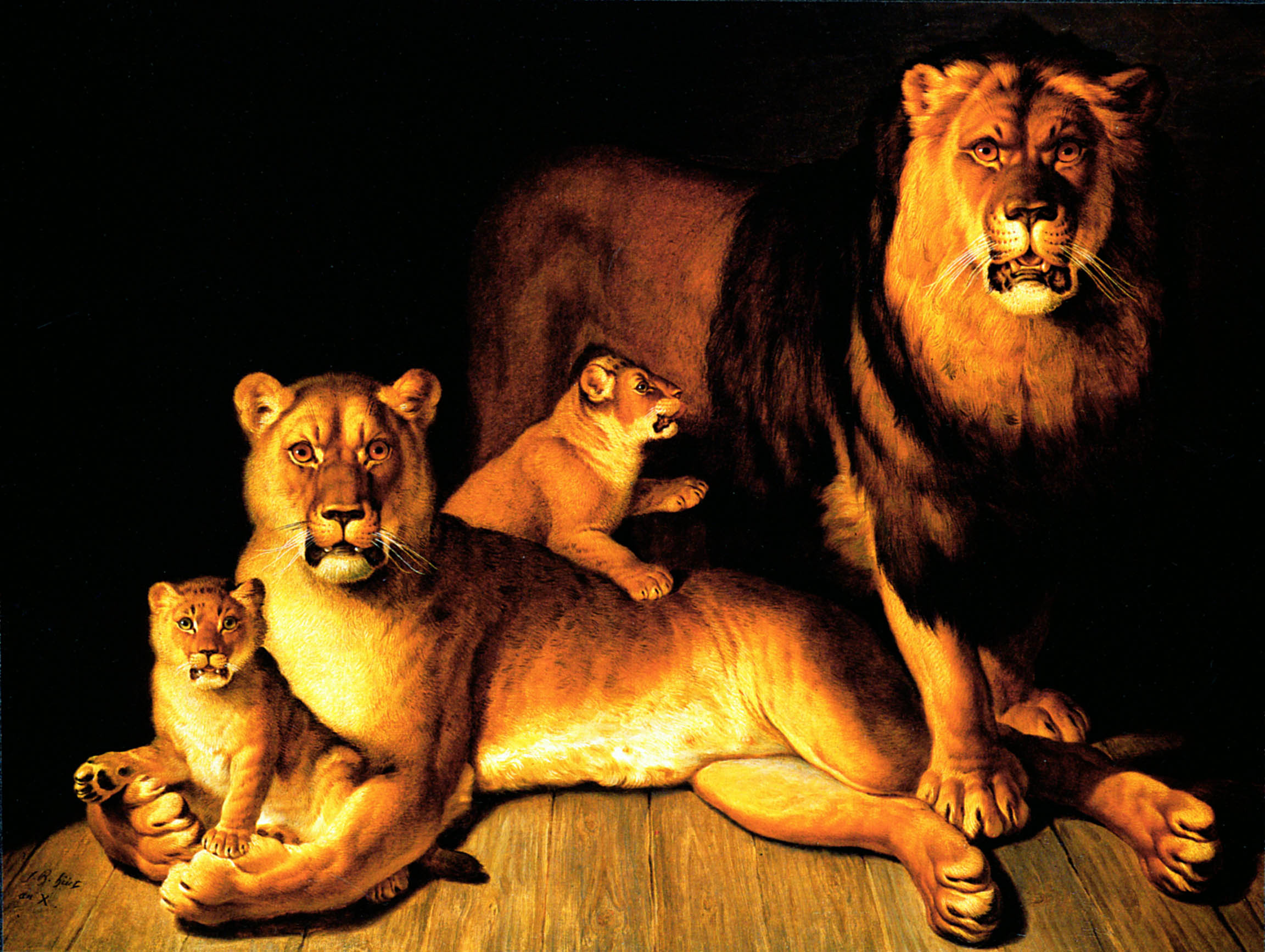
A Pride of Lions by Jean-Baptiste Huet

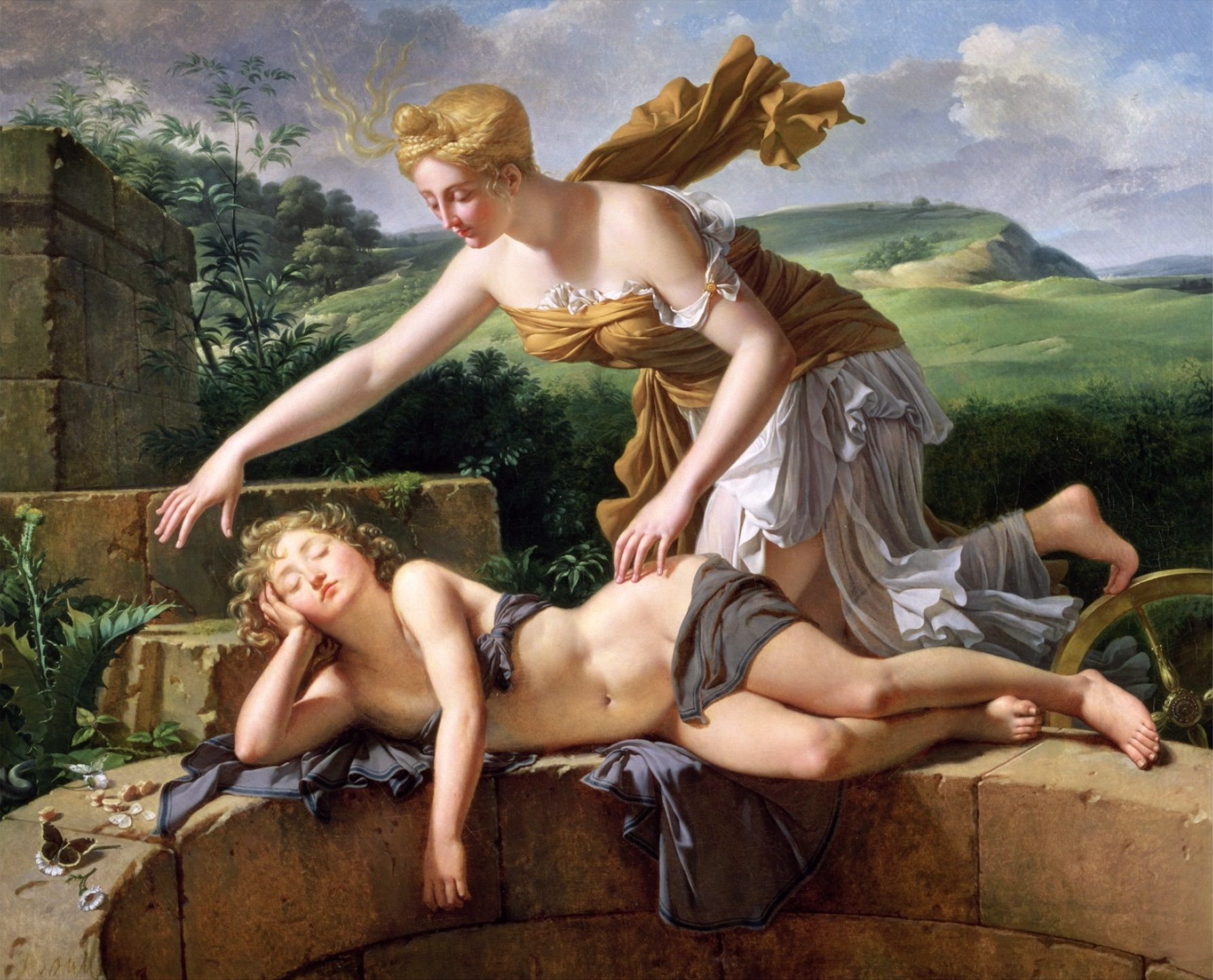
The Child of Fortune by Pierre Bouillon

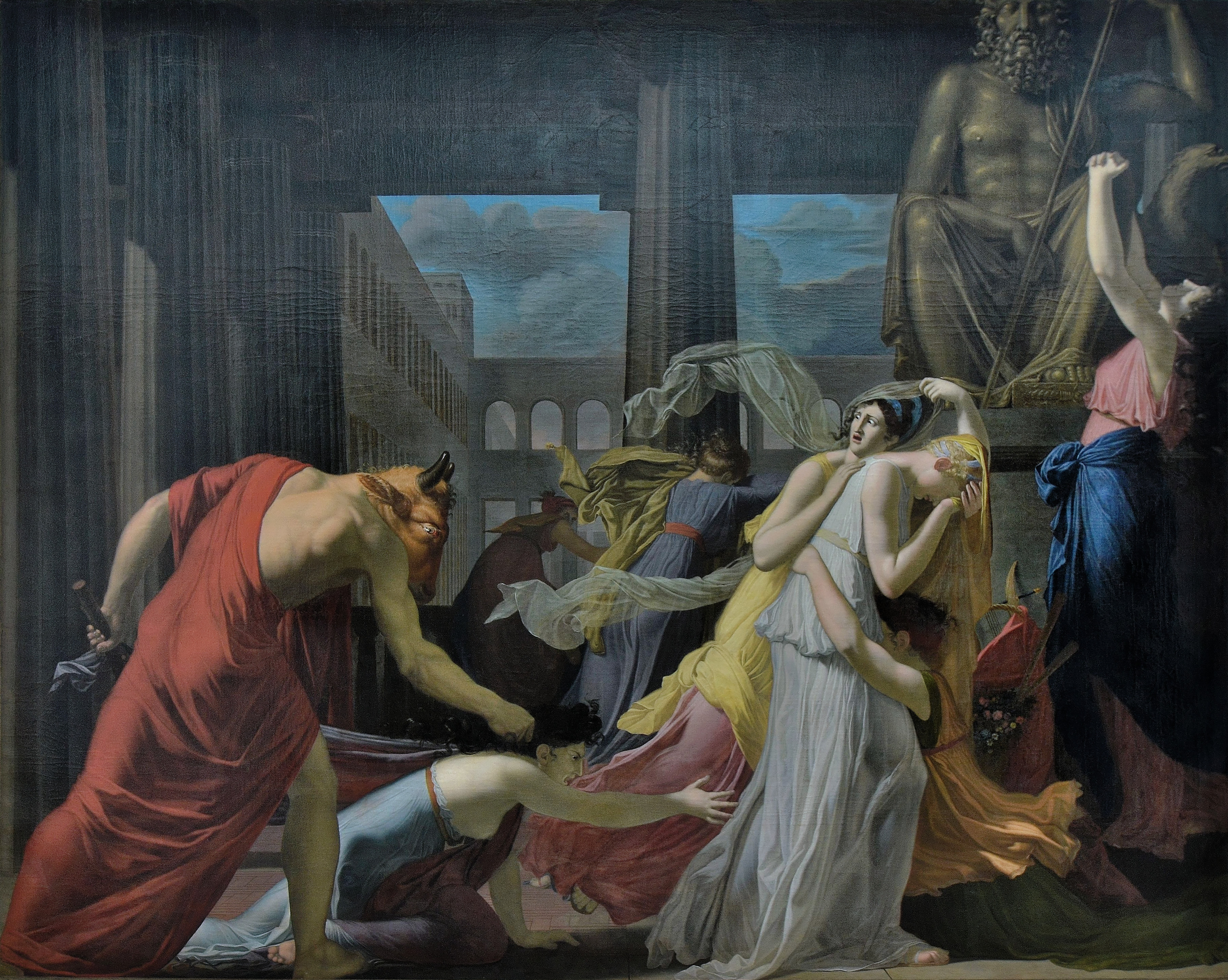
The Seven Athenian Women and the Minotaur by Jean-Baptiste Peytavin

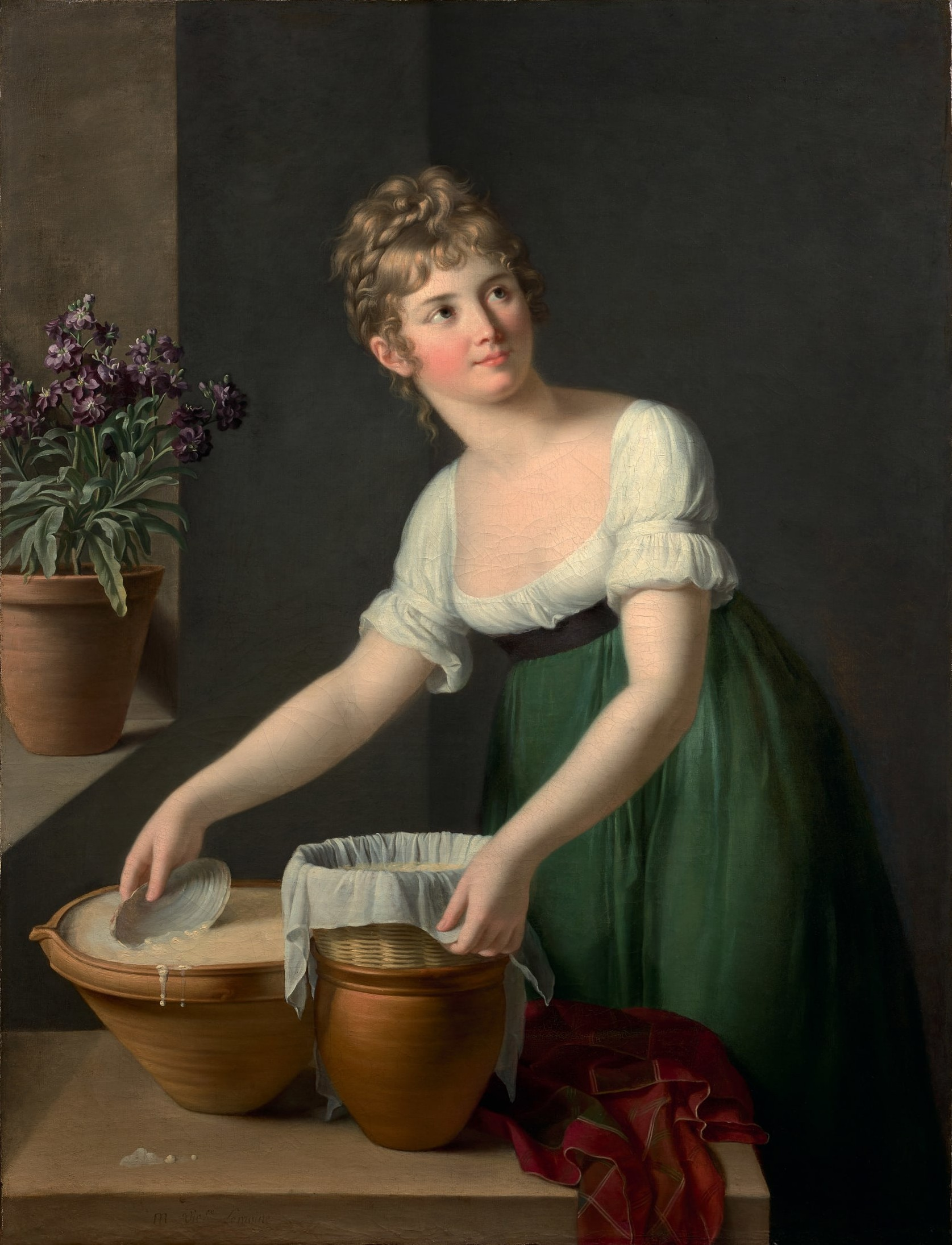
Young Woman Making Cheese by Marie-Victoire Lemoine

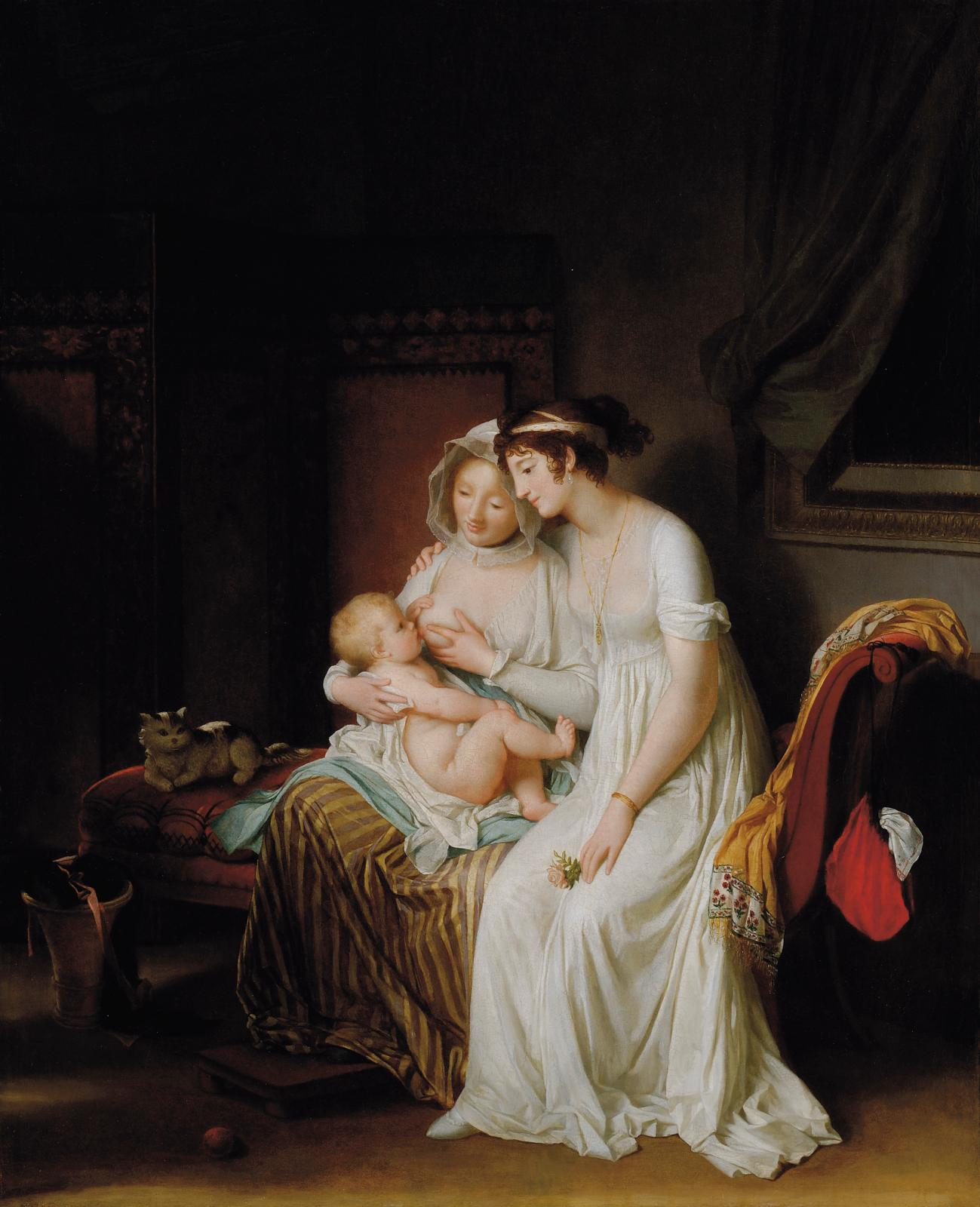
Une jeune femme allaitant son enfant by Marguerite Gérard

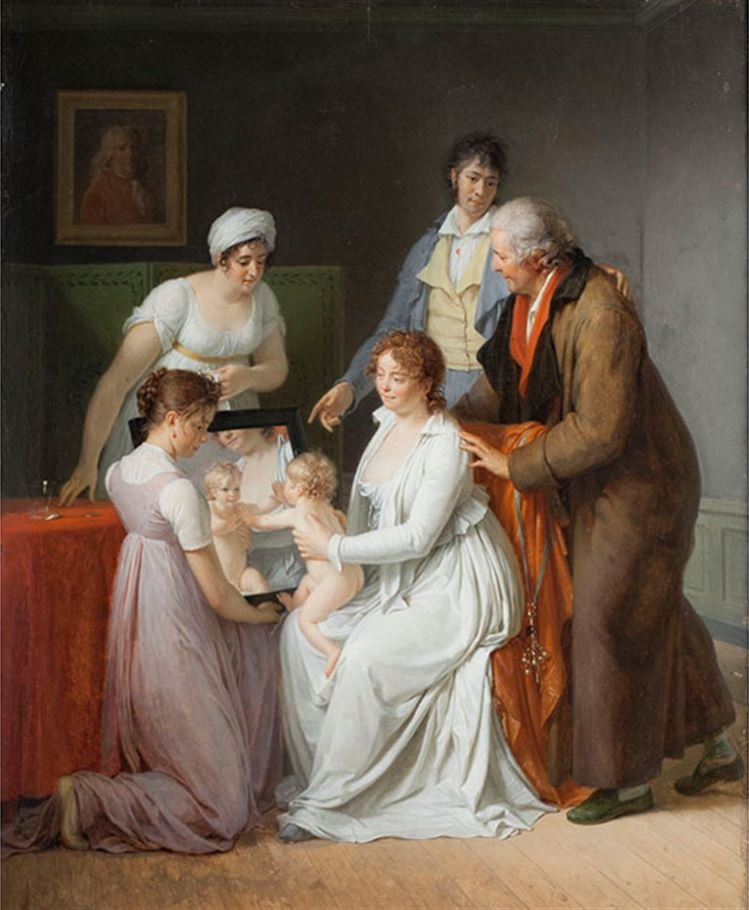
Portrait of the Artist and His Family by Jacques-Augustin-Catherine Pajou

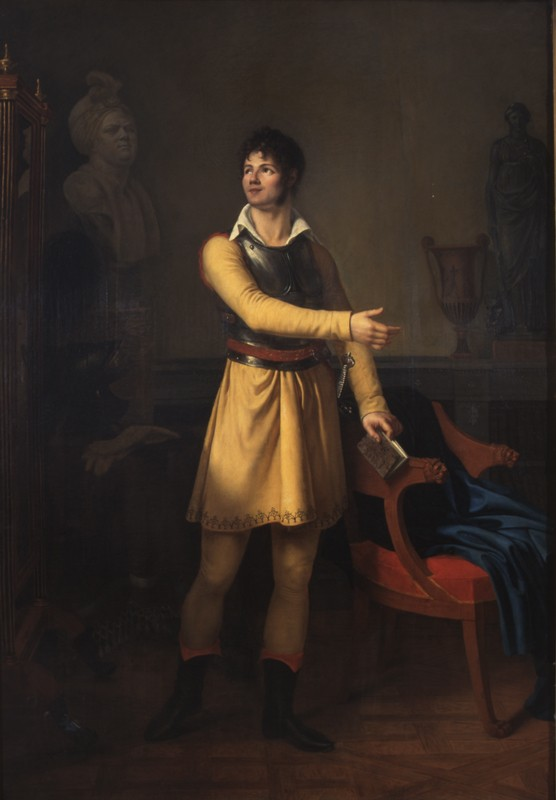
Portrait of Pierre Lafon in the Role of Tancrède by Eugénie Delaporte

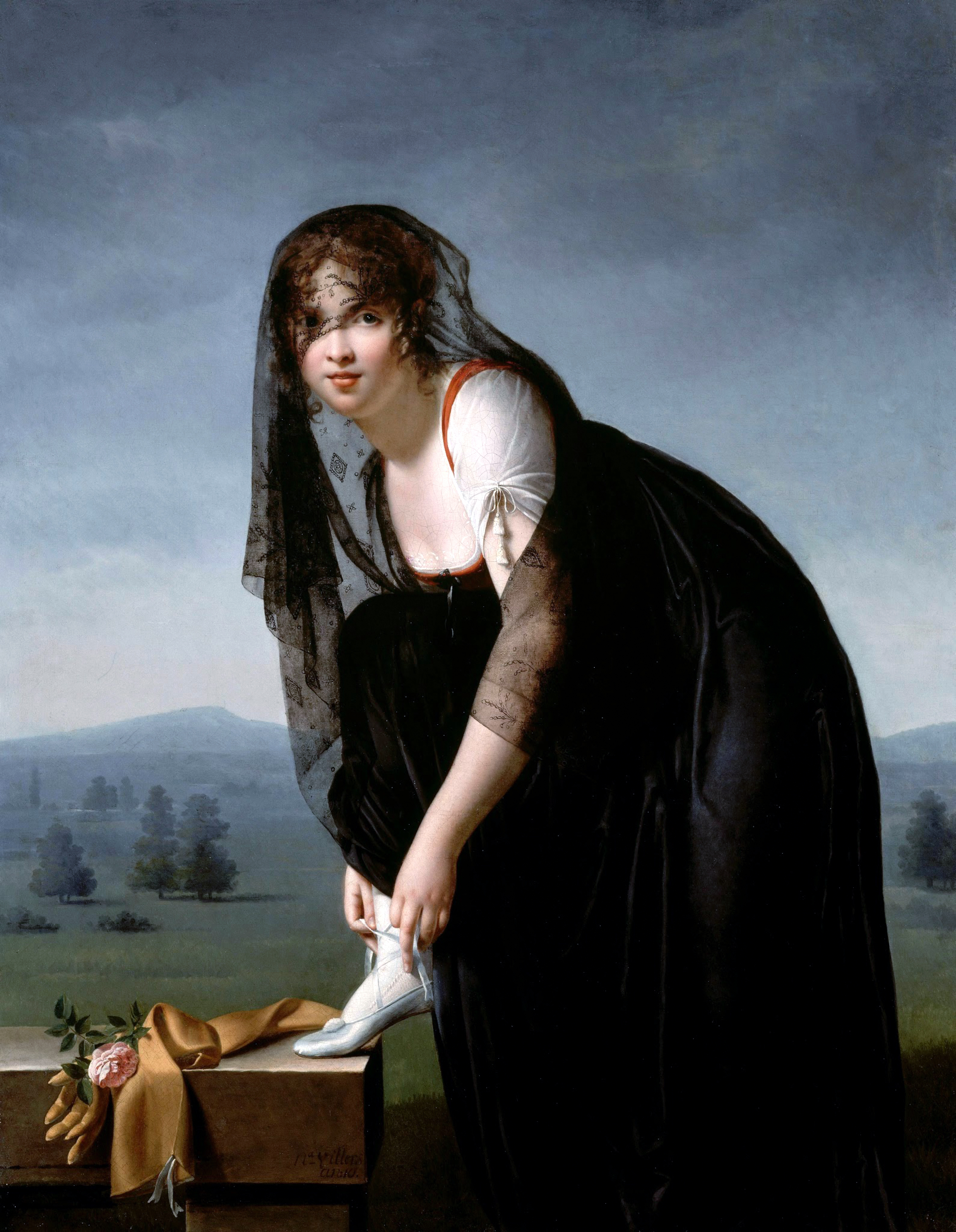
Study of a Woman by Marie-Denise Villers

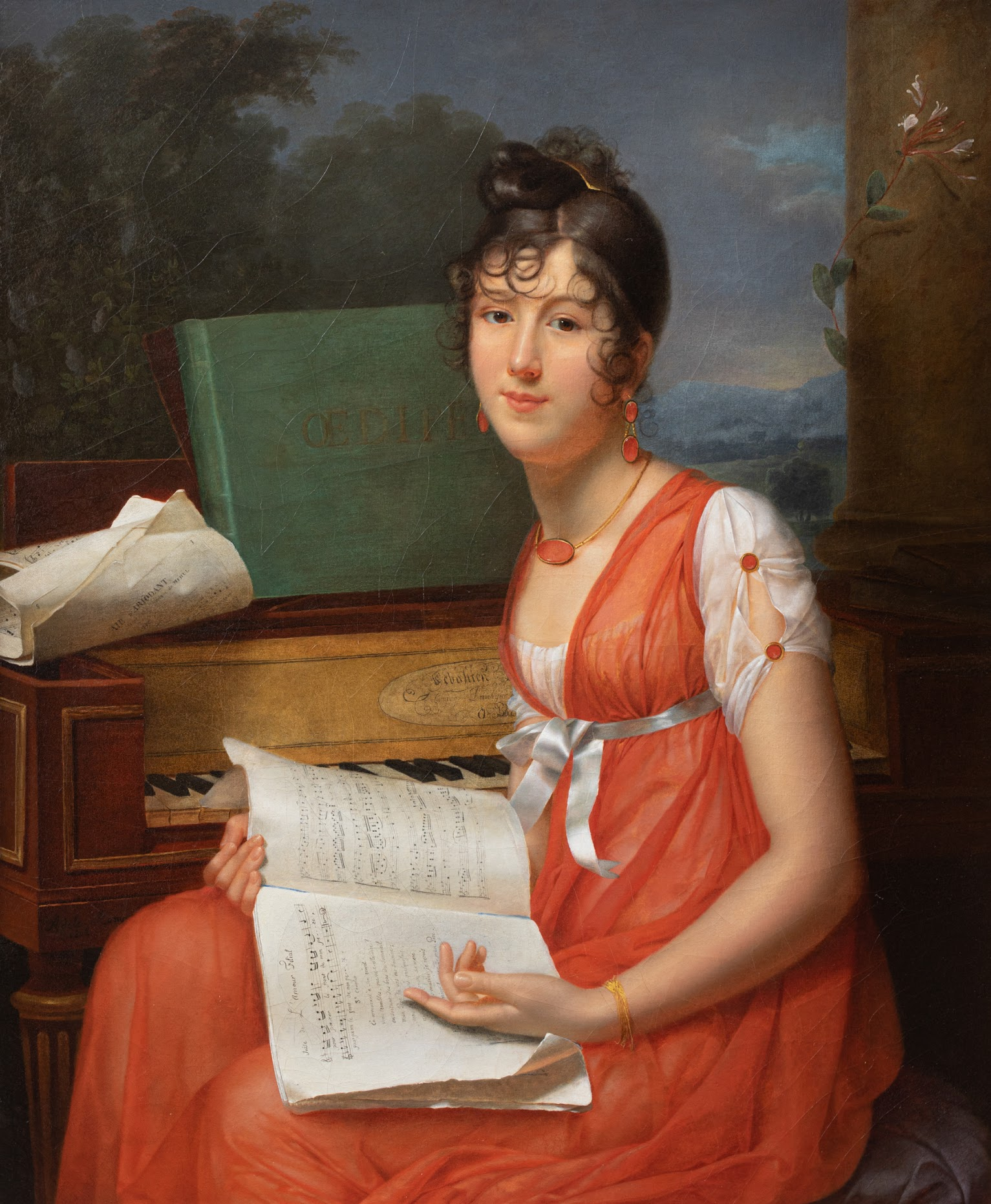
Portrait of a Young Piano Player Holding a Music Score (Miss Thevenet de Montgarrel) by Adèle Romany

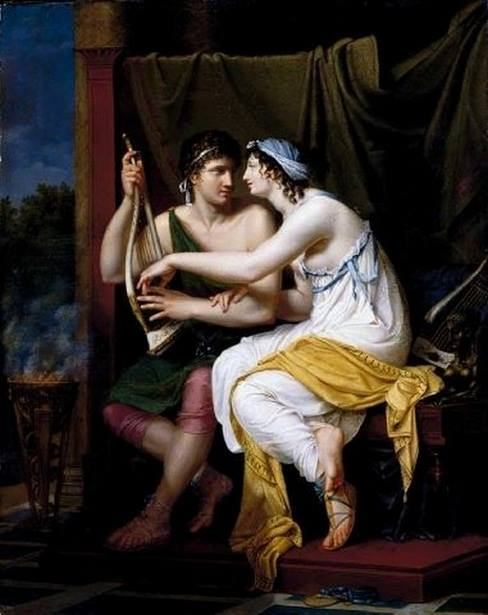
Young Lovers Playing the Lyre by Adèle Romany

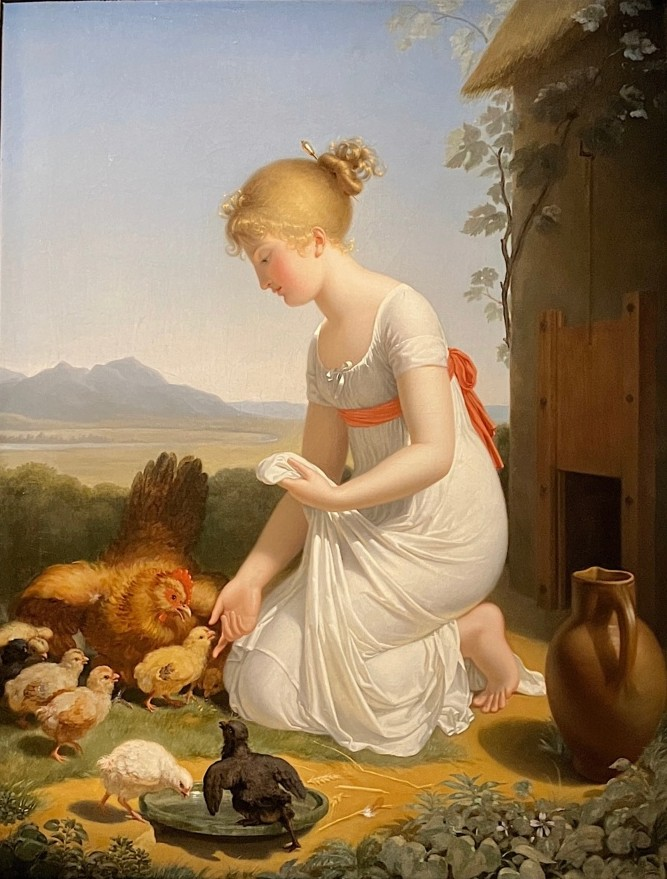
Young Girl Feeding Her Chickens by Jeanne-Elisabeth Chaudet

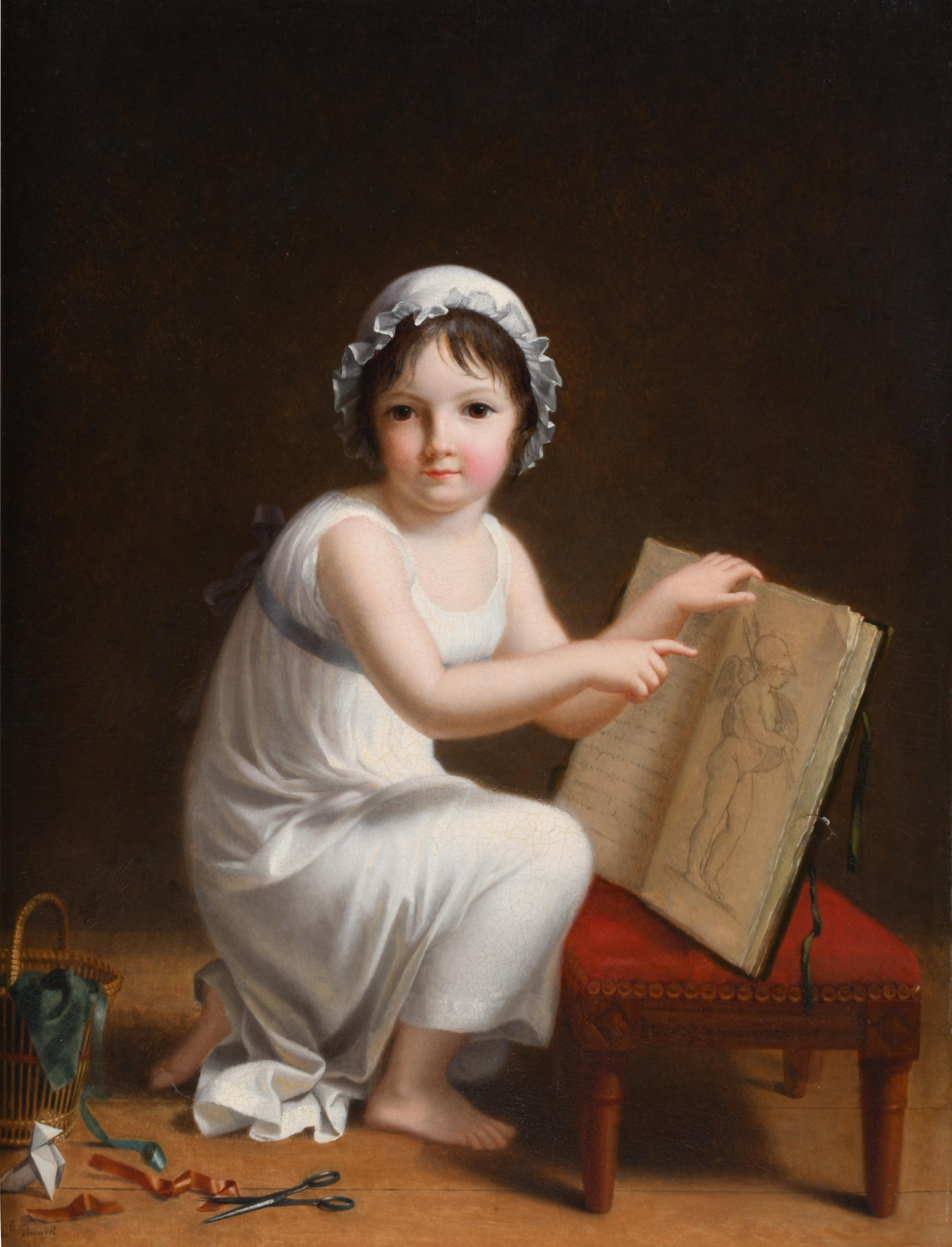
A Child Showing Pictures from a Book by Jeanne-Elisabeth Chaudet

== See also ==
- Royal Academy Exhibition of 1802, held at Somerset House in London

== Bibliography ==
- Betzer, Sarah E. Ingres and the Studio: Women, Painting, History. University of Pennsylvania Press, 2012.
- Bordes, Phillipe. Jacques-Louis David: Empire to Exile. Yale University Press, 2007.
- Facos, Michelle. An Introduction to Nineteenth-Century Art. Taylor & Francis, 2011.
- Johnson, Dorothy (ed.) Jacques-Louis David: New Perspectives. University of Delaware Press, 2006.
- Kiefer, Carol Solomon . The Empress Josephine: Art & Royal Identity. Mead Art Museum, Amherst College, 2005.
- Smith, Anthony D. The Nation Made Real: Art and National Identity in Western Europe, 1600–1850. OUP Oxford, 2013.
- Tinterow, Gary & Conisbee, Philip (ed.) Portraits by Ingres: Image of an Epoch. Metropolitan Museum of Art, 1999.
- Ventura, Gal. Maternal Breast-Feeding and Its Substitutes in Nineteenth-Century French Art. BRILL, 2018.
