= Hodgkin family =

British Quaker family

The Hodgkin family is a British Quaker family where several members have excelled in science, medicine, and arts.

The first famous member of the family was the grammarian and calligrapher John Hodgkin (1766–1845). His descendants include the physician Thomas Hodgkin (after whom Hodgkin's lymphoma was named), the historian Thomas Hodgkin (bearing the same name), and Nobel laureate physiologist Alan Hodgkin.

== Family tree ==
For clarity, the tree does not include every family member. It is focused on the most prominent members and their direct ancestors and descendants, as well as those who, by marriage, connect the family to other prominent families or individuals.

Hodgkin family tree

John Hodgkin; 1766-1845	Elizabeth Rickman
John Hodgkin (died in infancy)	Rickman Hodgkin (died in infancy)	Thomas Hodgkin; 1798–1866	John Hodgkin; 1800–1875	Elizabeth Hodgkin (née Howard); 1803-1836
Sarah Ransome	John Eliot Hodgkin; 1829-1912	Thomas Hodgkin; 1831–1913	Lucy Ann Hodgkin (née Fox)	Mariabella Fry (née Hodgkin); 1833-1930	Edward Fry; 1827-1918	Elizabeth Waterhouse (née Hodgkin); 1834-1918	Alfred Waterhouse; 1830-1905
Stanley Howard Hodgkin; 1860-1945	Charles Ernest Hodgkin; 1861-1951	8 more children	Lucy Violet Hodgkin	John Hodgkin	Edward Hodgkin	Elizabeth Hodgkin	Ellen Sophie Hodgkin	Robert Howard Hodgkin; 1877-1951	Dorothy Forster Hodgkin (née Smith)	George Hodgkin; 1880-1918
Eliot Hodgkin; 1905-1973	Eliot Hodgkin; 1905-1987	Dorothy Hodgkin (née Crowfoot); 1910-1994	Thomas Lionel Hodgkin; 1910–1982	Lawrence Durrell; 1912-1990	Nancy Isobel Myers	Edward Christian Hodgkin; 1913-2006	Alan Hodgkin; 1914–1998	Marni Hodgkin (née Rous); 1917-2015
Howard Hodgkin; 1932-2017	Luke Hodgkin; 1938-2020	Elizabeth Hodgkin; 1941-	Toby Hodgkin; 1946-	Joanna Hodgkin; 1947-	Jonathan Hodgkin; 1949-

== The first generation: John Hodgkin ==
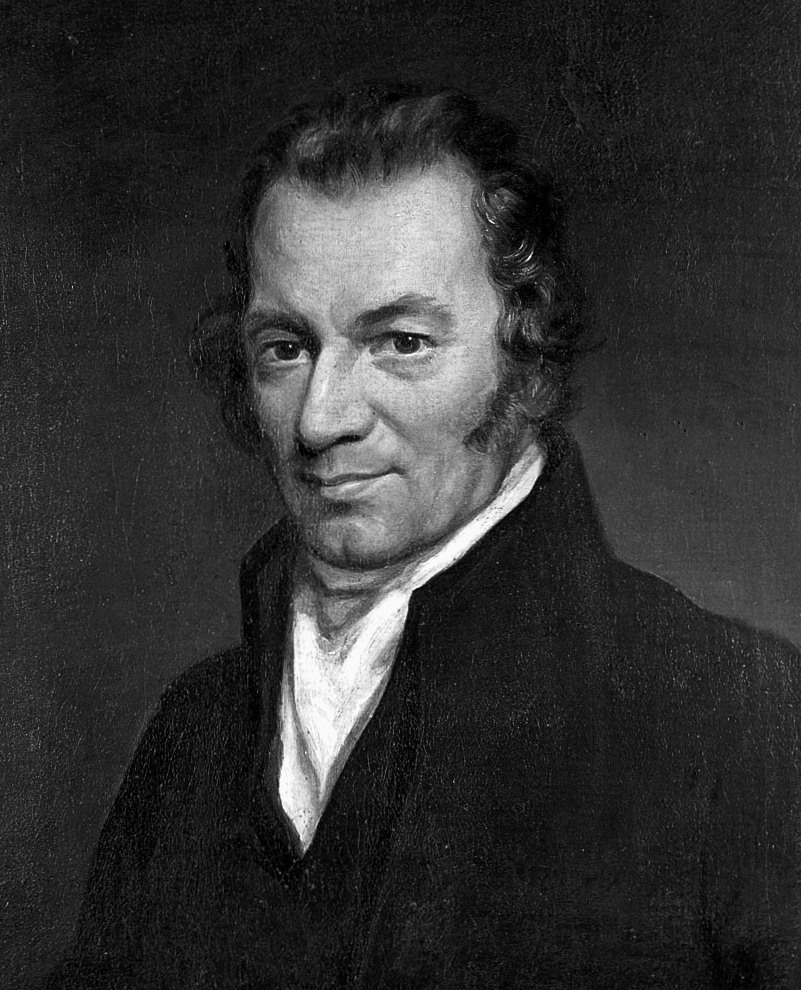
John Hodgkin (1766–1845)

John Hodgkin (1766–1845) was an English tutor, grammarian, and calligrapher. He married Elizabeth Rickman (1768-1833) of a Sussex Quaker family and together they had four sons of whom the first two died in infancy

- John Hodgkin
- Rickman Hodgkin
- Thomas Hodgkin (1798–1866)
- John Hodgkin (1800–1875)

== The second generation ==
=== Thomas Hodgkin (physician) ===
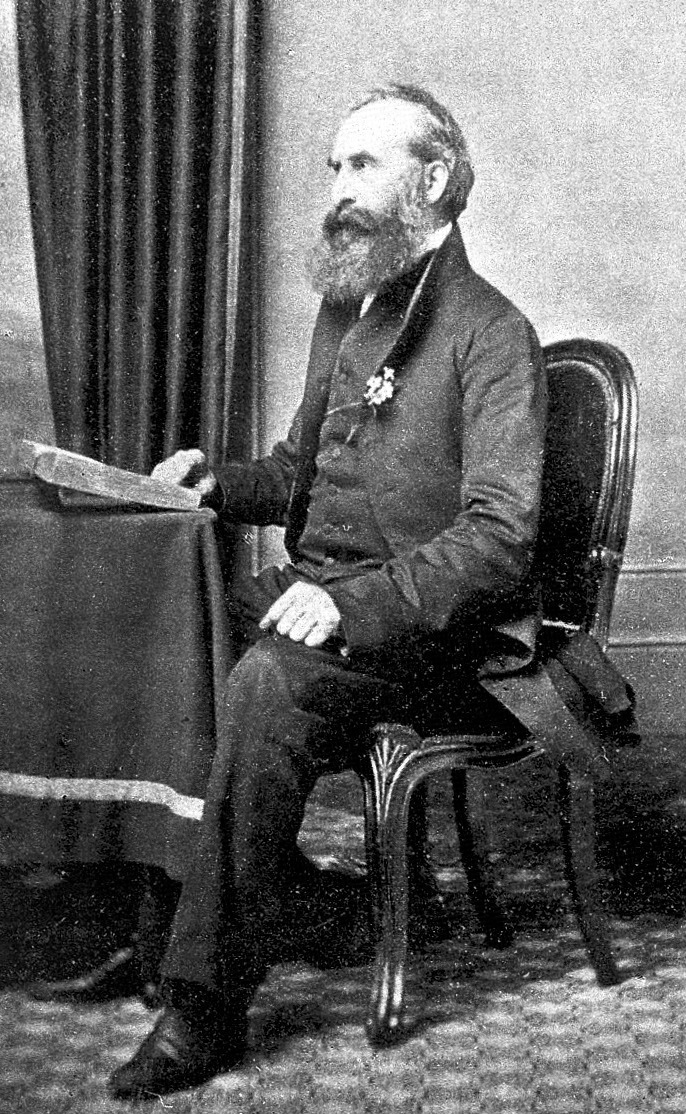
Thomas Hodgkin (1798-1866)

Thomas Hodgkin (1798 – 1866), or "Uncle Doctor" as he was known to succeeding generations, was a British physician, considered one of the most prominent pathologists of his time and a pioneer in preventive medicine. Hodgkin's lymphoma is named after him. In 1850 he married Sarah Frances Scaife, a widow, but the couple had no children.

=== John Hodgkin ===
John Hodgkin (1800-1875) was an English barrister and Quaker preacher. He was married three times. From his first marriage to Elizabeth Howard (daughter of the meteorologist and chemist Luke Howard) he had five children, including the historian Thomas Hodgkin

== The third generation ==
Because John Hodgkin's first two sons died in infancy, and Thomas Hodgkin had no children, all members of the third generation were children of the younger John Hodgkin.

=== Thomas Hodgkin (historian) ===
Thomas Hodgkin (1831 – 1913) was a British historian and biographer. He is particularly known for his 8-volume magnum opus Italy and her Invaders. He married Lucy Ann Fox, daughter of Alfred Fox and had seven children with her. These include the historian Robert Howard Hodgkin and George Hodgkin, father to Nobel Laureate Alan Hodgkin.

== The fourth generation ==
=== Robert Howard Hodgkin ===
Robert Howard Hodgkin (1877 – 1951) was an English historian of modern history and Provost of The Queen's College, Oxford. He was married to Dorothy Forster Smith, daughter of fellow Oxford historian Arthur Smith and together they had a son, Thomas Lionel Hodgkin.

=== Henry Theodore Hodgkin ===
Henry Hodgkin (1877-1933), son of John Hodgkin's son Jonathan Backhouse Hodgkin, was a medical doctor and a British Quaker missionary who, in the course of his 55-year life, co-founded the West China Union University in Chengdu, co-founded and led the first Christian pacifist movement, the International Fellowship of Reconciliation, and founded the Pendle Hill Quaker meeting and training center, in Wallingford, Pennsylvania.

== The fifth generation ==
=== Eliot Hodgkin ===
Eliot Hodgkin (1905 – 1987) was an English painter, son of Charles Ernest Hodgkin, grandson of the engineer and antiquary John Eliot Hodgkin, and great-grandson of John Hodgkin. In 1940 he married Maria Clara Egle Laura (Mimi) Henderson (née Franceschi) and together they had one son and three grandchildren.

=== Thomas Lionel Hodgkin ===
Thomas Lionel Hodgkin (1910 – 1982) was an English Marxist historian of Africa. He was the son of Robert Howard Hodgkin and Dorothy Forster Smith, daughter of the historian Arthur Lionel Smith. In 1937, he married the British chemist Dorothy Crowfoot (1910-1994) who, under the name Dorothy Crowfoot Hodgkin, was awarded the Nobel Prize in Chemistry in 1964.

=== Alan Hodgkin ===
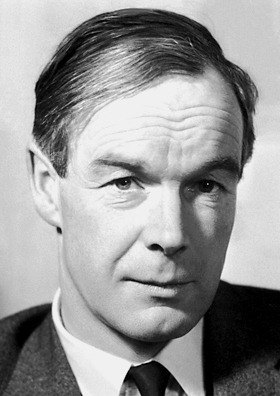
Alan Lloyd Hodgkin (1914-1998)

Sir Alan Lloyd Hodgkin (1914 – 1998) was an English physiologist and biophysicist, who shared the 1963 Nobel Prize in Physiology or Medicine with Andrew Huxley and John Eccles. He married Marion Rous in 1944, daughter of American pathologist Francis Peyton Rous, who won the 1966 Nobel Prize in Physiology or Medicine. Their son Jonathan Hodgkin became a molecular biologist at Cambridge University.

=== Ernest Pease Hodgkin ===
Ernest Pease Hodgkin (1908 – 1998) was a renowned medical entomologist and marine biologist. Born in Madagascar as a descendant of the Pease family he studied malarial transmission in Malaysia, was a prisoner of war in Changi prison, and became the foremost expert on Western Australian river ecology and founded many of the Australian Quaker meeting houses and schools.

== The sixth generation ==
=== Howard Hodgkin ===
Sir Gordon Howard Eliot Hodgkin CH CBE (1932 – 2017) was a British painter.

=== Joanna Hodgkin ===
Joanna Hodgkin (born 1947) is a British novelist known primarily for mysteries who has published under both her maiden name Joanna Hodgkin and her married name Joanna Hines. She is also the biographer of her mother, Nancy Isobel Myers, who was the much-abused first wife of the writer Lawrence Durrell.

=== Jonathan Hodgkin ===
Jonathan Alan Hodgkin (born 1949) is a British biochemist, Professor of Genetics at the University of Oxford, and an emeritus fellow of Keble College, Oxford.
