= Benwell Dene =

Grade II listed house designed by Alfred Waterhouse in Newcastle upon Tyne, England

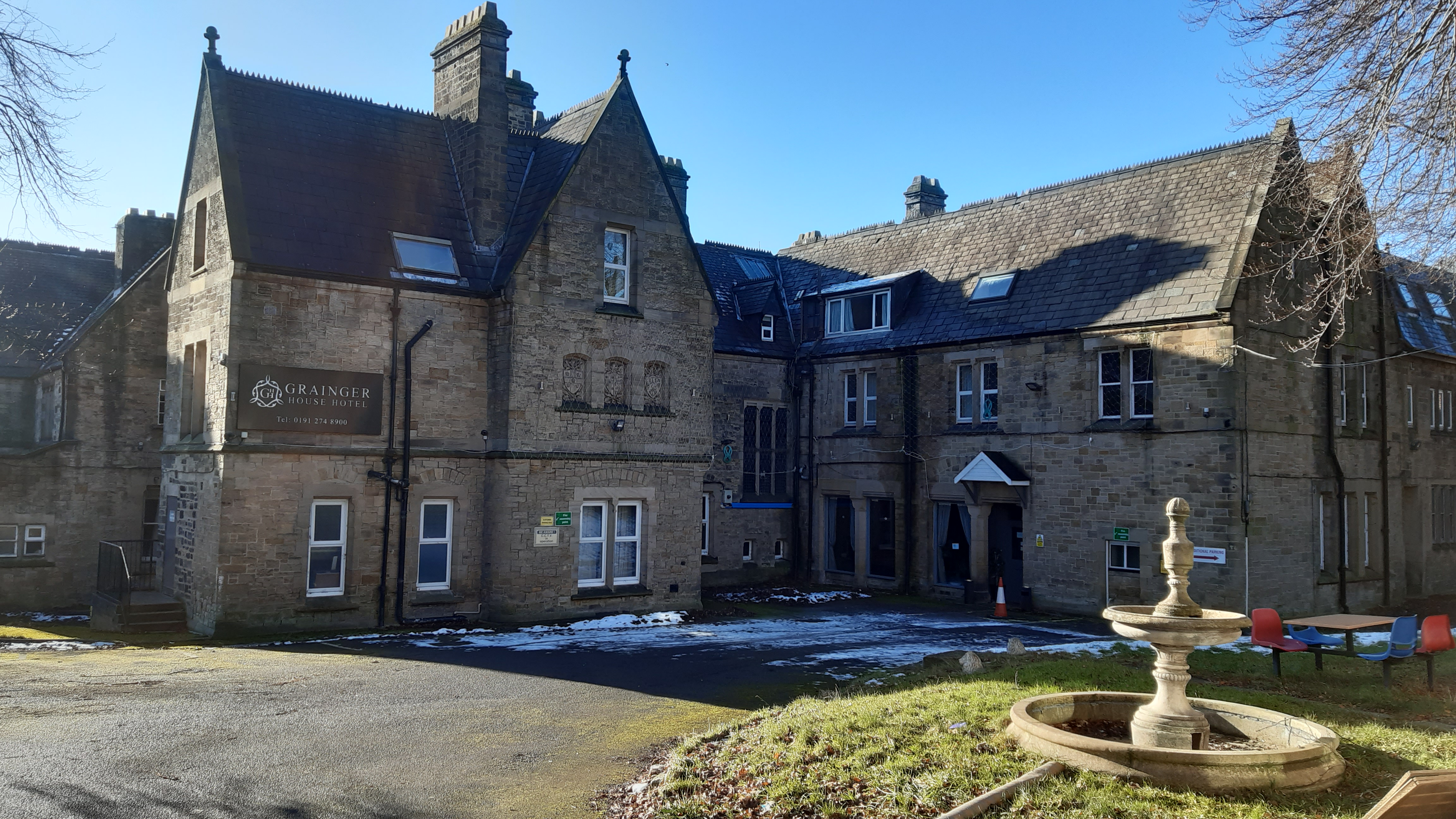

- Location within Northumberland
- 54.9726°N 1.6695°W
- Type: House
- Location: Newcastle upon Tyne, Northumberland, United Kingdom

History
- Built: 1869–1895
- Built for: Dr Thomas Hodgkin

Site notes
- Architect: Alfred Waterhouse
- Architectural style: Tudor Revival
- Governing body: Privately owned

Listed Building – Grade II
- Official name: Royal Victoria School for the Blind
- Designated: 17 December 1971
- Reference no.: 1024958

Listed Building – Grade II
- Official name: Lodge to Victoria School for the Blind
- Designated: 30 March 1987
- Reference no.: 1116529

Benwell Dene is a Victorian building in the suburb of Benwell, Newcastle Upon Tyne, England. It was designed by Alfred Waterhouse for Dr Thomas Hodgkin and was built in 1865. Hodgkin donated the house to the Royal Victoria Home in 1894, and bequeathed the gardens and grounds to the people of Newcastle as a public park. The building subsequently became the Royal Victoria School for the Blind. After the school's closure in 1985, the structure was converted into a hotel. It is a Grade II listed building.

== History ==
The Hodgkin family made their careers in finance, science, medicine and the arts. Following their Quaker faith, they were also notable philanthropists. Thomas Hodgkin (1831–1913) was the grandson of John Hodgkin (1766–1845), the family's founder. Thomas Hodgkin was a banker, and he founded the family finance house of Hodgkin, Barnett, Pease, Spence & Co. based in Newcastle. His primary interest was historical research and his fame largely drives from his 8-volume history, Italy and her Invaders, published between 1880 and 1899. In the 1860s, Hodgkin settled in the West End of Newcastle Upon Tyne, in the suburb of Benwell, and commissioned Alfred Waterhouse to build him a house. Waterhouse had already undertaken work in Newcastle and elsewhere for the Pease family, fellow Quakers and partners in Hodgkin's bank. (Note: Alfred Waterhouse subsequently designed Pendower Hall in Benwell for John William Pease (1836–1901), Hodgkin's business partner and brother-in-law.) Hodgkin raised his family of seven children at the house, including Robert Howard Hodgkin, later a historian and Provost of The Queen's College, Oxford.

Thomas Hodgkin donated Benwell Dene to the Royal Victoria Home in 1894. The grounds were given to the people of Newcastle to form Hodgkin Park. The house subsequently became the Royal Victoria School for the Blind which remained at Benwell for 90 years until its closure in 1985. The building was subsequently converted into a hotel.

== Architecture and description ==
Benwell Dene is built of sandstone to a courtyard plan, with two storeys and attics. The architectural style is "Tudor Gothic". It is listed Grade II on the Historic England register, as is the lodge at the head of the drive.

== Sources ==
- Pevsner, Nikolaus; Richmond, Ian (2002). Northumberland. The Buildings Of England. New Haven, US and London: Yale University Press. ISBN 978-0-300-09638-5.
