= Thomas Lionel Hodgkin =

English historian (1910–1982)

Thomas Hodgkin
- Born: Thomas Lionel Hodgkin; 3 April 1910; Headington, Oxford, England
- Died: 25 March 1982 (aged 71); Greece
- Education: Balliol College, Oxford
- Occupation: Historian
- Years active: 1945–1982
- Spouse: Dorothy Crowfoot (m. 1937)
- Children: 3
- Father: Robert Howard Hodgkin
- Relatives: Hodgkin family

Thomas Lionel Hodgkin (3 April 1910 – 25 March 1982) was an English Marxist historian of Africa, who was described by The Times at his death of having done "more than anyone to establish the serious study of African history" in the UK. He was married to the Nobel Prize-winning scientist Dorothy Hodgkin.

== Early life and education ==
Thomas Lionel Hodgkin was born at Mendip House, Headington Hill, near Oxford. Named after his grandfather, the historian Thomas Hodgkin, he was the son of Robert Howard Hodgkin, Provost of Queen's College, Oxford, and Dorothy Forster Smith, daughter of the historian Arthur Lionel Smith.

Hodgkin was an exhibitioner at Winchester and from 1928 to 1932 a classics scholar at Balliol College, Oxford, where he also held a Higgs Memorial scholarship in English. He obtained a Second in Classical Moderations in 1930 and a First in Literae Humaniores or "Greats" (philosophy and ancient history) in 1932.

== Palestine and the WEA ==
A senior demyship at Magdalen College, Oxford, 1932–33, enabled him to travel; he spent the years on John Garstang's archaeological dig at Jericho. From 1934 to 1936, Hodgkin was in the Palestine civil service, for some time being a personal secretary to High Commissioner Wauchope. There, Hodgkin started to become critical of British imperialism. Resigning from the colonial service after the April 1936 Arab uprising, he hoped to stay in Palestine but was ordered to leave by the British administration.

Returning to London, where he stayed with his father's cousin, Margery Fry, and joined the Communist Party, Hodgkin briefly tried training as a schoolteacher, before entering adult education. He met and married Dorothy Crowfoot in 1937, with whom he had two sons and a daughter.

In 1939, declared ineligible for military service on medical grounds (he suffered from narcolepsy), Hodgkin became a Workers' Educational Association tutor in north Staffordshire. In September 1945, he became Secretary of the Oxford Delegacy for Extra-Mural Studies, and a Balliol fellow.

== Travels in Africa ==
He first visited the Gold Coast in 1947, and became interested in African history as well as the contemporary problems of African nationalism. Befriending Kwame Nkrumah in 1951, he published a pamphlet for the Union of Democratic Control supporting independence for the Gold Coast.

In 1952, Hodgkin left his Oxford job and travelled in Africa. After publishing Nationalism in Colonial Africa (1956), he became interested in Africa's Islamic history.

== Northwestern, McGill, Legon and Balliol ==
He took part-time appointments at Northwestern University (Illinois) and McGill University (Montreal), was joint secretary of a commission on reform of Ghana's universities, and in 1962 returned to Ghana for three years to head the new Institute of African Studies at the University of Ghana.

From 1965 until his 1970 retirement, Hodgkin was Lecturer in the Government of New States at Oxford University. He died in Greece on 25 March 1982.

== Works ==
- "Hating Italy", Red Rags: Essays of Hate from Oxford, ed. R. C. Carr, London: Chapman & Hall, 1933, 161–176
- Nationalism in Colonial Africa (Frederick Muller, 1956. 2nd edn, 1957. E-Book 2008)
- (ed.) Nigerian Perspectives (Oxford University Press, 1960. 2nd edn, 1975)
- African Political Parties (Penguin Books, 1961)
- Vietnam: the Revolutionary Path (Macmillan, 1981)

== Sources ==
- C. Allen and R. W. Johnson, eds, African Perspectives: papers in the history, politics and economics of Africa presented to Thomas Hodgkin (Cambridge University Press, 1970)
- Michael Wolfers, Thomas Hodgkin: Wandering Scholar - A Biography (Merlin Press, 2007)
- E. C. Hodgkin (ed.), Thomas Hodgkin. Letters from Palestine, 1932-36 (Quartet Books, 1986)
- Michael Wolfers & Elizabeth Hodgkin (eds), Thomas Hodgkin: Letters from Africa, 1947-56 (HAAN Publishing, 2000)
