= Robert Howard Hodgkin =

British historian (1877–1951)

Robert Howard Hodgkin FSA
- Hodgkin in 1945
- Born: 24 April 1877; Benwell Dene, Newcastle upon Tyne, England
- Died: 28 June 1951 (aged 74); Shipston-on-Stour, England
- Education: Balliol College, Oxford
- Occupation: Historian
- Years active: 1900–1949
- Known for: A History of the Anglo-Saxons (1935); Six Centuries of an Oxford College (1949)
- Spouse: Dorothy Forster Smith (m. 1908)
- Relatives: Hodgkin family

Robert Howard Hodgkin FSA (24 April 1877 – 28 June 1951) was an English historian. He taught at the Queen's College, Oxford, from 1900 to 1937 and served as its provost from 1937 until 1946. He was particularly known for his 1935 work, A History of the Anglo-Saxons, and for his 1949 book, Six Centuries of an Oxford College.

Born at the family house Benwell Dene in Newcastle upon Tyne, Hodgkin was a son of the banker and historian Thomas Hodgkin, and part of a so-called "Quaker dynasty" with many accomplished relatives. From 1896 to 1899, he attended Balliol College, Oxford, graduating with first-class honours in the Final School of Modern History. The following year, he volunteered to serve in the Northumberland Fusiliers, rejoining them during the First World War, which ultimately led to him being forced to leave the Society of Friends.

Hodgkin was appointed a lecturer of modern history at Queen's in 1900. He was made a fellow in 1904, a tutor in 1910, and, from 1928 to 1934, he held the post of university lecturer in modern history. From 1936 to 1937, he filled two terms as pro-provost when B. H. Streeter fell ill, resumed teaching in April, and retired towards the end of the year. Retirement lasted less than a week, however, for Streeter (now returned to his duties) died in a plane crash, and Hodgkin was asked to take on the role permanently. He served for nine years, all during the Second World War or its prelude.

As a teacher, Hodgkin was remembered by a student for being "suggestive rather than purely instructive", offering signposts for "the roads and tracks" but "leav[ing] his pupils to explore for themselves". As provost, he was remembered for his dedication, for shepherding the college through the wartime years, and for two important works: the reconstruction of the college's grand library, and his book on the college's history.

== Early life and education ==
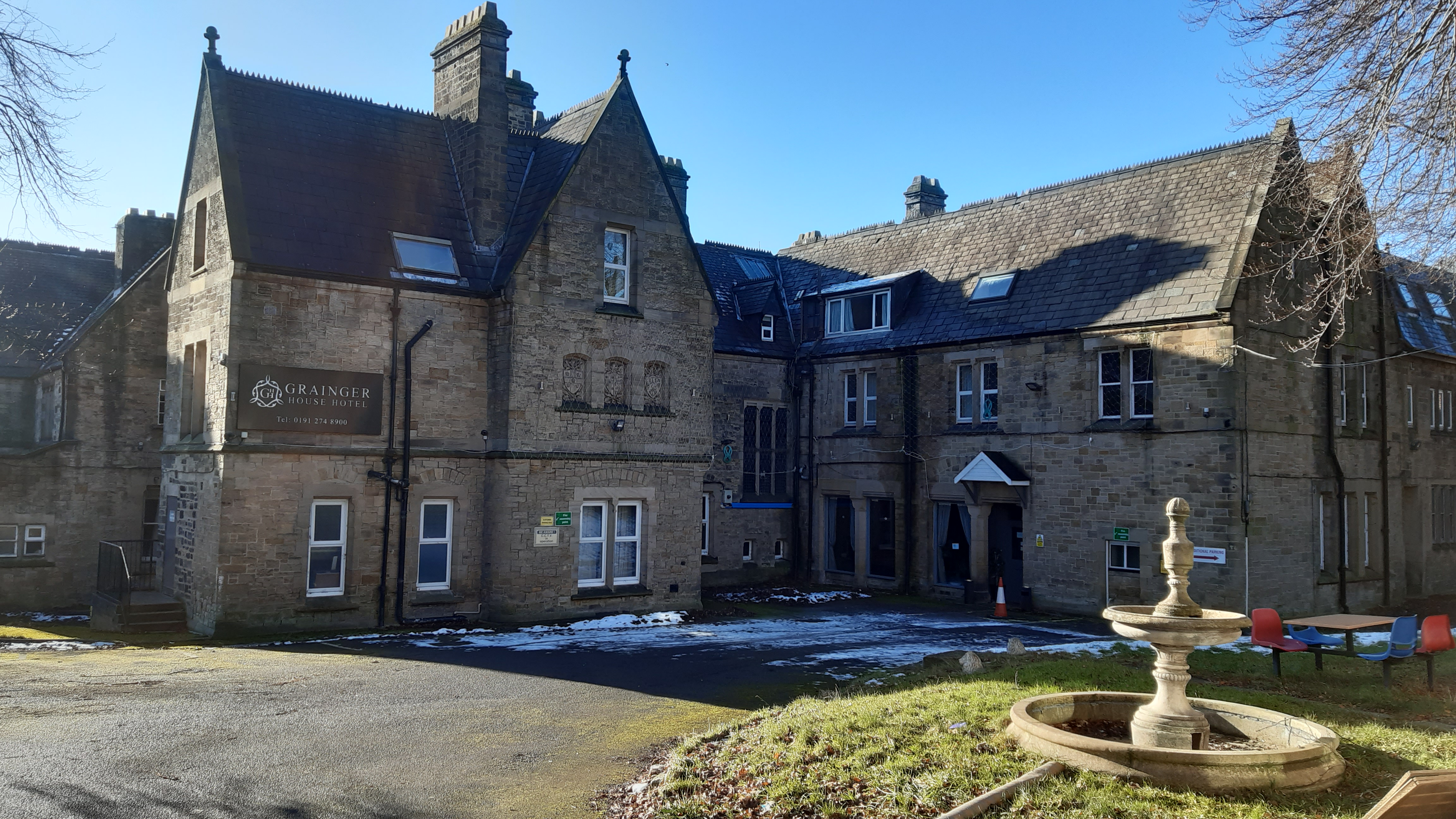
Benwell Dene, the Alfred Waterhouse-designed home where Hodgkin was born

Robert Howard Hodgkin (Note: Per his wife, "always 'Robin' to his family and his friends".) was born in Newcastle upon Tyne on 24 April 1877, at the family house Benwell Dene. His mother was Lucy Hodgkin (born Lucy Anna Fox), and his father was Thomas Hodgkin, a banker and historian of Europe in the Middle Ages. Robert Hodgkin was the sixth of seven surviving children, following Violet (b. 1869), John (b. 1871, but died the year after), Edward (b. 1872), Elizabeth ("Lily," b. 1873), and Ellen ("Nelly," b. 1875), and followed by George (b. 1880). "The Hodgkins", said a friend of a relative, "are a Quaker dynasty with all that that implies". Among others, Robert Hodgkin was related to the painter Sir Howard Hodgkin, the namesake of Hodgkin's lymphoma Thomas Hodgkin, and Alan Hodgkin, winner of the 1963 Nobel Prize in Physiology or Medicine.

Hodgkin left Benwell Dene in 1887, aged ten, to spend the first of four years at the preparatory Seabank School, in Alnmouth, though several months of his first year were spent at home recovering from bronchitis. By all accounts, Hodgkin's first years at school were unhappy. "School at Alnmouth was not a bit a happy time", one sister later recalled; "when he was old he used to say that it did seem strange that the hardest lessons you had to learn came at the very beginning of life." Another noted that "he hated it too much to talk about it", and that when older, he stated "The one thing to be said for it was that all later miseries seemed nothing by comparison". Hodgkin's wife, meanwhile, termed him a "home lover" for whom the time at Seabank was "more or less unhappy". Hodgkin would pray for the school to burn down, and one year his prayers were answered, in a fashion, when an outbreak of scarlet fever led to all the boys being sent home. The situation improved slightly when Hodgkin's brother George, three and a half years his junior, entered Seabank, and (as his sister wrote), "Robin became resigned".

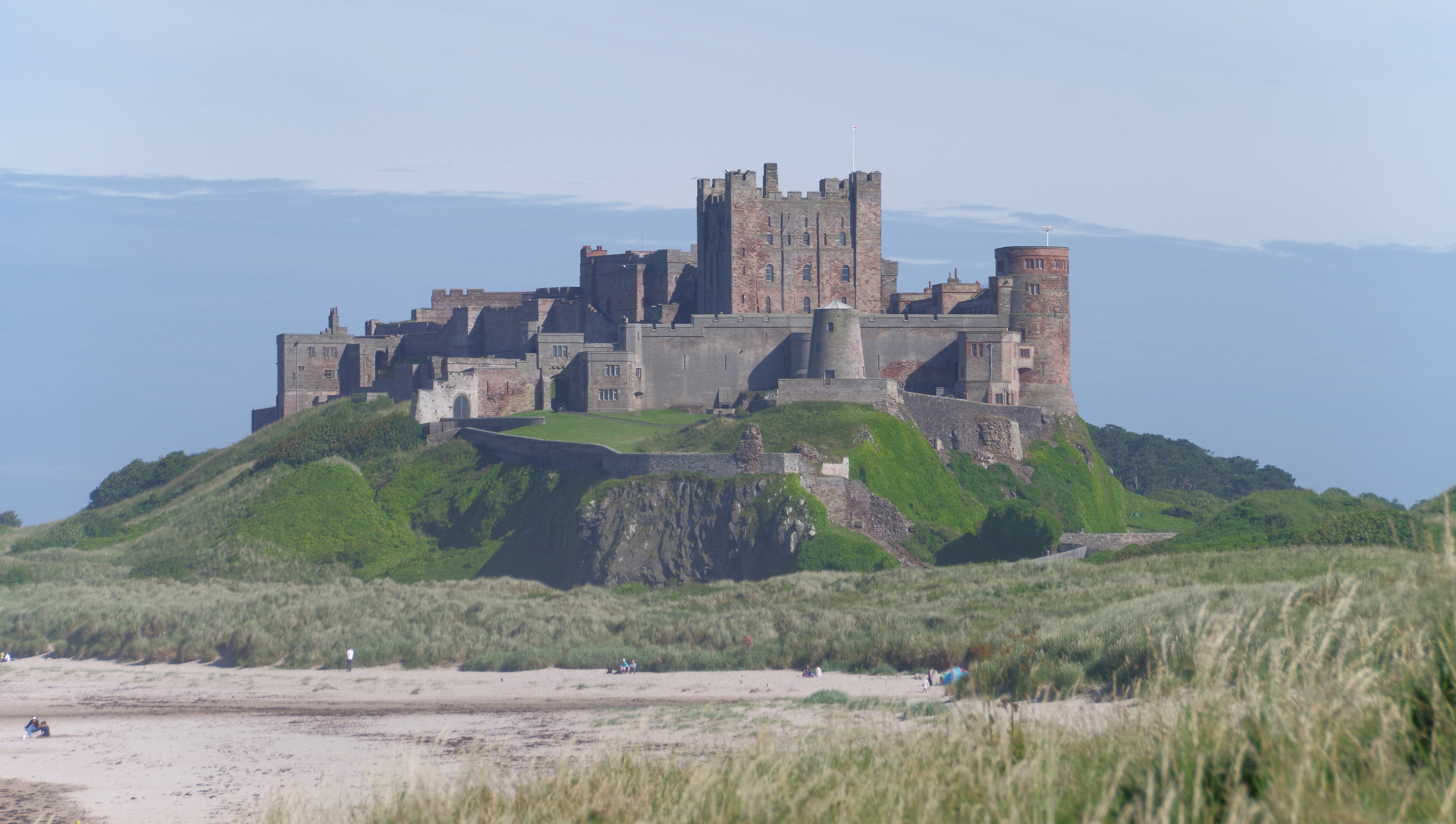
Bamburgh Castle; the keep is the tallest structure.

Around 1890, Hodgkin's father rented Chollerton Farmhouse in Chollerton, Northumberland, as a holiday home. The following September, Hodgkin enrolled at Repton, where he spent two terms, much of it in the school's sanatorium. The frequent ill health, one sister wrote, was possibly one reason for Hodgkin's unhappiness at school. In any event, his doctor advised that he attend a school further south. This brought Hodgkin (as well his younger brother) to the Quaker Leighton Park School, where he stayed from 1892 until 1895. In 1894, meanwhile, Hodgkin and his sisters Lily and Ellen were taken by their father to Italy and Austria, where they spent time in Milan, Florence, Rome, Naples, Ravenna, and Vienna. Their homes, too, were changing: at the end of 1893, the family sold Benwell Dene and took a five-year lease on the keep at Bamburgh Castle, and from 1900 to 1913, resided at Barmoor Castle. Hodgkin's wife later suggested that the time spent along the Northumbrian coast while at Seabank and Bamburgh influenced Hodgkin's interest in England and English history.

In Hodgkin's first year at Bamburgh, his father became acquainted with Arthur Smith, a teacher at Balliol College at the University of Oxford who had his holiday home nearby. It was arranged for Hodgkin to live with and be coached by Smith for a term before taking the Balliol entrance exam. He attended Balliol from 1896 to 1899. His friends there included his cousins Ted Backhouse and Henry (Tommy) Hodgkin, James (Jimmy) Palmer, later the Bishop of Bombay, F. F. Urquhart, A. W. Pickard-Cambridge, a poet named Carré, and others by the names of Tawney and Beveridge. (Note: At some point Hodgkin also became friends with William Temple, a tutor at Queen's College before becoming the Bishop of Manchester, Archbishop of York, and then Archbishop of Canterbury.) His best friend was Richard Denman, and at one point, along with two others, they worked their way on a cargo steamer to Saint Petersburg before travelling along the Volga and exploring the Caucasus, stopping in Tiflis in Georgia, and eventually leaving for home from Odesa in Ukraine. Hodgkin, Denman, and Urquhart were members of the Balliol hockey team, which Hodgkin captained. Hodgkin and another friend, Kenneth Swan, were part of the short-lived "Romance Society" at Balliol, which met once a fortnight to hear and discuss short stories written by its members; they also played hockey and tennis, and enjoyed Sunday teas at the home of the Smiths. In 1899, Hodgkin was proxime, or runner-up, for the Stanhope essay prize, behind Robert Rait, and in Trinity term obtained first-class honours in the Final School of Modern History.

Hodgkin took a free year upon leaving Balliol. During the year he wrote a biography of Elizabeth Stuart, Queen of Bohemia, which was published in Rait's 1902 book Five Stuart Princesses. He also spent time studying German in Dresden.

=== Second Boer War ===
Despite his Quaker roots, Hodgkin supported the Second Boer War, volunteering as a lieutenant with the 1st V.B. Northumberland Fusiliers from 1900 to 1906. That year, he wrote to the Quaker magazine The Friend, saying many members of the movement—known as the Society of Friends—shared his views but hid behind the Quakers' pacifist stance, "bringing on the Society the shadow of hypocrisy". His father also supported the war, rankling other Quakers, and causing John Wilhelm Rowntree to write to Rufus Jones in indignation, saying "[y]ou would hardly believe your eyes if you came over here. Thos. Hodgkin's son a Lieutenant, though still a nominal Quaker, heads a procession to burn Kruger in effigy, T. Hodgkin makes the speech and Lily [Lucy?] Hodgkin lights the faggots ... the spirit of war, stalks the land naked, unashamed & our leading Quaker gives his benediction!" Not all agreed; Caroline Stephen wrote to Robert Hodgkin's mother that there was "much of nobleness ... much that appeals to all one's best feelings" in what he had done. Hodgkin was ultimately forced to leave the Society of Friends in 1903 because of his military service in the Second Boer War. The severance was "a blow to him and to all of us", his sister later wrote, since he had been "a loyal if not an enthusiastic Friend" since his time at Leighton Park.

== Career ==
After graduating, Hodgkin competed unsuccessfully for various prize fellowships, and was considering a business career when, in 1900, Queen's College, Oxford, offered him a lectureship in modern history. On 19 May 1904, he was elected to a fellowship at the college, and, in 1910, had also become a tutor. Though second in command to Edward Armstrong as a tutor, Hodgkin was responsible for much of the history teaching. George William Rendel, a pupil of Hodgkin from 1908 to 1911, credited Hodgkin with a pedagogical approach that was "suggestive rather than purely instructive", and that would "signpost[] the roads and tracks" and then "leave his pupils to explore for themselves".

=== First World War ===
Before the First World War, Hodgkin had a small number of students, and would socialise with them over meals, tennis, and walks on Shotover. After Britain declared war in August 1914, Hodgkin began volunteering at a YMCA embarkation camp in the New Forest; over Michaelmas term, he watched the college population gradually dwindle as its members were accepted for service, while awaiting the result of his own application to rejoin the Northumberland Fusiliers. Accepted on 11 December and commissioned a temporary captain in the Seventh Battalion of the Northumberland Fusiliers, he was posted to the battalion headquarters in Alnwick. Because Hodgkin was deemed medically unfit for foreign service, his four years of service were primarily spent in coastal defence, split nearly equally between Northumberland (1915), Herne Bay in Kent (1916–1917), and (from 1917 to 1919) the War Office in London, where he served in the General Staff for Operations. Other than the first year, he was able to spend the time with his family. Following the war, Hodgkin was a staunch supporter of the League of Nations Union.

=== Return to Queen's College ===
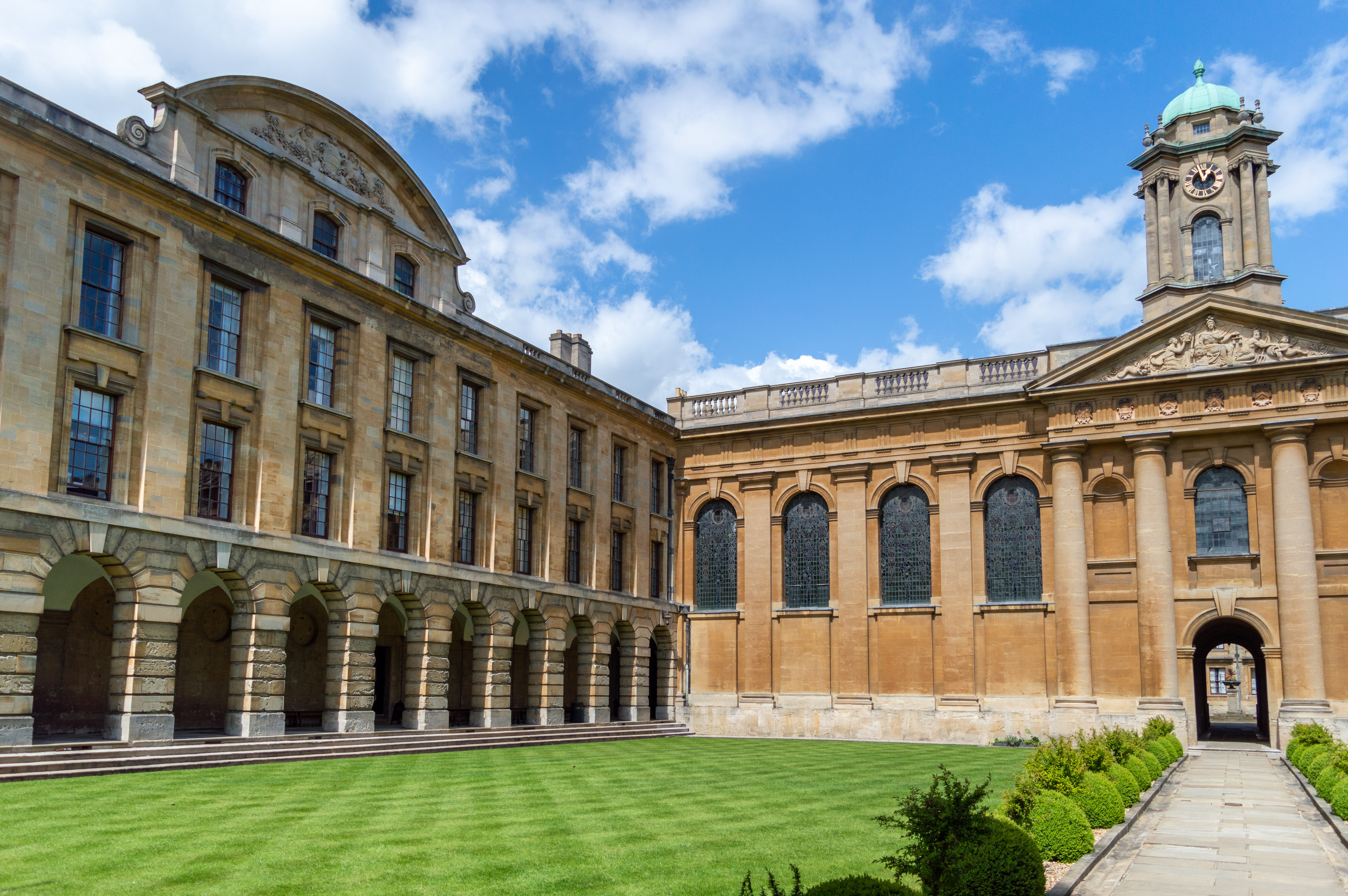
Front Quad at The Queen's College, Oxford

Demobilised in January 1919, Hodgkin returned with his family to Oxford, where he found substantially more students and consequentially more demands on his time. Norman Sykes, who joined Queen's as a student in 1920, recalled that "[t]he protracted tenure of the Provostship by Magrath meant the disappearance of hospitality from the Provost's lodgings"; he looked instead to Hodgkin for "generous and hospitable entertainment". Hodgkin's health, meanwhile, never particularly robust, also became more of an issue, with frequent colds and flu during the winters, and recurring migraines that would last for several days. For years, Hodgkin spent vacations working on a history of Anglo-Saxon England; his initial idea had been to write a life of Alfred the Great for the Heroes of the Nations series, but it quickly blossomed into something larger. In October 1927, a month after the death of his daughter, he began a sabbatical year with time spent at the British Museum and at libraries and museums in Germany and Denmark. (Note: Stops in Germany included in Cologne, where he stayed at the Excelsior Hotel Ernst, and in Freiburg im Breisgau.) The sabbatical "spared the ordeal", his wife later wrote, "of living for that first year of our loss in an empty house". Upon his return, in 1928 Hodgkin was appointed university lecturer in modern history, a post he held until 1934. Owing in large part to the sabbatical, Hodgkin finally finished A History of the Anglo-Saxons, his first major work, in 1933; (Note: Noting the "more than a generation" that went into Hodgkin's work, Godfrey Elton said Hodgkin's "modesty was the chief obstacle: he once remarked that it must be hateful to have to see your work criticised in public". "But in 1933 when Streeter was elected Provost," Elton continued, "Hodgkin must have supposed that he would never succeed to the Headship of the College, for which he must have known, though scarcely have admitted it even to himself, that his devotion so admirably qualified him. And it may be that this decided him to devote himself to bringing his long studies to the point of publication.") the following two years were spent refining it and collecting illustrations, leading to the book's publication in the spring of 1935.

From 1935 to 1936, Hodgkin took a second sabbatical. Most of the time was spent in a cottage in Broad Campden, although two spring months were spent in Palestine, where his eldest son was working, and his second son visiting during a break between graduation and work. Among others, Hodgkin met Arthur Grenfell Wauchope and George Antonius. Once returned to Queen's College following the 1936 summer vacation, Hodgkin spent two terms as pro-provost, (Note: The college's statutes at the time permitted the appointment of a pro-provost "in case of the Provost's sickness, or for any other urgent cause"; the pro-provost would "during the absence or sickness of the Provost perform the functions and exercise the powers of the Provost".) filling in for an ill B. H. Streeter. (Note: Streeter, who had been a Fellow of the college since 1905, had become provost in 1933. According to Hodgkin's wife, the college had initially looked outside for the provost, leading Hodgkin to consider resigning and taking a position at a provincial university in protest.) Hodgkin's diligence and success in the role came as a surprise to some of his colleagues, who had understood him to prefer the human side of college work to the business side; his disapproval of those who were distracted during meetings caused some comparisons to poachers turned gamekeepers. In February 1937, Hodgkin was elected a fellow of the Society of Antiquaries, (Note: In 1945, Hodgkin served on the Society's council.) and in April he stepped down from the provostship upon Streeter's return.

Hodgkin had spent around two years looking for a retirement home; his wife later wrote "the country within a forty mile radius of Oxford is dotted with houses that we looked over, and in several cases came near to buying". During his 1935–1936 sabbatical he received a notice in the morning post that an Ilmington house, Crab Mill, would be auctioned "unless previously disposed of", and upon looking it over Hodgkin purchased it outright, along with eleven surrounding houses and cottages, for some £11,250 (equivalent to £894,000 in 2024). Hodgkin retired around August 1937 (effective 29 September), moving to Crab Mill.

=== Provostship ===
Shortly before Hodgkin's retirement was set to go into effect, Streeter died in a plane crash. The fellows of the college had only three weeks to pick a successor. Hodgkin was seen as a logical choice as the senior official fellow at the time, and had demonstrated his abilities when filling in the previous year. Although he supported electing Oliver Franks, Hodgkin let colleagues know that he would be unable to refuse if chosen. Hodgkin was unofficially selected at a meeting on 22 September, his retirement went into effect on the 29th, and he was officially elected provost on 5 October; his six days spent as an ordinary fellow set a record for brevity, Crab Mill went from retirement home to weekend retreat, and the Hodgkins moved into the provost's lodgings. The new post interrupted plans for a second volume of A History of the Anglo-Saxons, which contemporaries such as F. M. Powicke and V. J. K. Brook either lamented or justified by Hodgkin's contributions as provost.

Only the first two of Hodgkin's nine years as provost were not during the Second World War, and even then, the first two years were spent under its encroaching shadow. Much of the first two years was spent socialising, with guests, and in committees. (Note: During Hodgkin's tenure he mentored Graeme Moodie, eventually helping him obtain a three-year Commonwealth Scholarship to Princeton University.) He also began collecting material for a work on the history of the college. Britain's declaration of war on Germany created a dual life for the college, with students conscripted and buildings requisitioned. It also added the duties of the Ilmington Home Guard, with Hodgkin doing drills and spending some nights in makeshift dugouts in the hills, watching for Germans. Hodgkin also joined the Hebdomadal Council during the war years. The college celebrated the six-hundredth anniversary of its founding in 1940, with more muted celebrations than had first been planned.

Hodgkin's time as provost was remembered for two major works, and for his dedication to the college. First, he began the reconstruction of the library, which, the fellow Ughtred Shuttleworth Haslam-Jones wrote, was "one of the finest buildings in Oxford" once "restored to its former glory". Haslam-Jones termed Hodgkin a "wise ruler" in his oversight of the project, as of the university, setting general principles and delegating authority, while investing himself neither too much nor too little in the details. Hodgkin's second major work was his undertaking of a written history of the college, finished in retirement. Especially during the war years, too, when the college was missing much of its population, Hodgkin—who probably saw his office as a trusteeship—was credited with preserving the continuity and traditions of the college.

=== Retirement ===
Hodgkin retired for the second time in 1946, and was named an honorary fellow. He was 68 at the time and could have held the post for another two years, but was at least partially spurred on to retire by the desire to have Franks replace him. "The College has never had a more devoted or self-effacing Head", wrote Brook, "[a]nd even at the end, he timed his resignation to suit what he thought were the interests of the College." Hodgkin was disappointed when Franks left only two years later to take up the post of British ambassador to the United States.

Hodgkin returned to Crab Mill in retirement, spending time with his family, and completing his book on the history of Queen's College. The book came "into being more rapidly that his Anglo-Saxons", wrote Godfrey Elton, "partly perhaps because he had shed his early inhibitions, but chiefly no doubt because, even more than the Anglo-Saxons, it was a labour of love". It was in press in the spring of 1949, when Hodgkin received news that the sole manuscript had been destroyed in a fire at the printers. A week later, Hodgkin—who had declared "I can never re-write it" but also been offered help by a former pupil to do so—burst into tears upon finding out that the book had been set up in type before the fire, and had thus survived. He also continued to have thoughts of writing a second volume of A History of the Anglo-Saxons and, more so, a family history, although he started neither.

== Personal life ==
On 6 August 1908, Hodgkin proposed to Dorothy Forster Smith, the daughter of Hodgkin's Balliol instructor. The engagement was facilitated by Hodgkin's sister Violet, who invited the unsuspecting Smith, summering at the nearby family house, to Barmoor. Astonished by the proposal, Smith responded with tears; only three days later did she agree to a trial engagement, although the two married on 15 December. The service was held at St Cross Church and conducted by Albert David. Hodgkin had continued living at Barmoor for the past seven years, but the family moved to Oxford in February 1909, purchasing Mendip House on Headington Hill following "a twenty-four hour dash south and frantic interviews with house agents and the owner". The family remained at Mendip for eight years, although Hodgkin spent only leaves there during the war years. Upon their return to Oxford in 1919, they purchased 20 Bradmore Road, formerly the home of the scholar and historian Henry Francis Pelham, a friend of Hodgkin's father; the Hodgkins kept the house until 1936, although they kept a place in Oxford by signing a three-year lease on a flat in Belsyre Court.

The Hodgkins had three children, all born at Mendip. Their first son, Thomas Lionel Hodgkin (b. 1910), became a Marxist historian of Africa. In 1937, he married Dorothy Crowfoot, who under her married name would win the Nobel Prize in Chemistry. A second son, Edward Christian Hodgkin ("Teddy", b. 1913), became a deputy and foreign editor at The Times; a younger daughter, Elizabeth ("Betty", b. 1915), died at the age of eleven, during an emergency operation on her appendix. The death particularly affected both Robert and Edward Hodgkin; for the former, wrote his wife, "I think there was never a time in the years that followed when the joy of her lovely life and the sorrow of her loss were not as present to him as all the happiness that came to him from his two sons and from his grandchildren." For Edward Hodgkin, meanwhile, who went from being a "devoted" brother to being told of her death "awkwardly and curtly, in his first term at Eton", and left to grieve away from his family, the death left what his obituary termed "a wound that was never completely healed". (Note: Eight months after his daughter's death, Hodgkin wrote from Freiburg that "This morning I set my face against the lovely Cologne Primitives and kept rigidly to Roman and Frankish antiquities. Among other things I copied out some of the Frankish inscriptions on tombstones. One of the fifth century: 'Leontius hic jacit fidelis puer dulcisimus patri, pietissimus matri. Qui vixit annis septem et mensis tres et dies sex. Innocens funere raptus, beatus mente, felix et in pace recessit'. ['Leontius lies here, a faithful boy, the sweetest to his father, the most pious to his mother. He lived seven years, three months, and six days. An innocent taken by death, blessed in mind, he departed happily in peace'.] I suppose sorrow has been almost the same through all the ages." In 1930, Edward Hodgkin's friend Randall Swingler published a short poem, Morning Pride, about Betty Hodgkin.)

Hodgkin's father died suddenly in 1913, aged 81. The lease at Barmoor also over, his mother moved to Treworgan, a house along the coast near Falmouth, Cornwall. Hodgkin's younger brother George died in 1918, and his elder brother Edward in 1921. The latter death left Hodgkin "the only 'man of the family'", in his wife's words, and the family's "protector", in his sister's; he subsequently took on responsibility for the family affairs, quipping that "[a]ccounts are a nice change from Alfred". Following the First World War and until his mother's death in 1934, Hodgkin, who had spent time in Cornwall during holidays as a child (including at Glendurgan), visited Treworgan two or three times a year with his children.

Hodgkin lost sight in one eye in November 1943, which he discovered upon waking; his wife attributed this, and other health ailments, to his frequent bicycling when wartime petrol rationing prevented the use of a car. He died on 28 June 1951, at the age of 74, at Crab Mill; his wife died in 1974. Crab Mill later became a retirement home for his son and daughter-in-law.

== Publications ==
- Hodgkin, Robert Howard (1902). "Elizabeth of Bohemia". In Rait, Robert (ed.). Five Stuart Princesses: Margaret of Scotland, Elizabeth of Bohemia, Mary of Orange, Henrietta of Orleans, Sophia of Hanover. Westminster: Archibald Constable & Co. Ltd. pp. 47–164.
- Hodgkin, Robert Howard (1935). A History of the Anglo-Saxons. Vol. I (1st ed.). Oxford: Clarendon Press.
- Hodgkin, Robert Howard (1935). A History of the Anglo-Saxons. Vol. II (1st ed.). Oxford: Clarendon Press.
- Hodgkin, Robert Howard (1939). A History of the Anglo-Saxons. Vol. I (2nd ed.). London: Oxford University Press.
- Hodgkin, Robert Howard (1939). A History of the Anglo-Saxons. Vol. II (2nd ed.). London: Oxford University Press.
- Hodgkin, Robert Howard (1952). A History of the Anglo-Saxons. Vol. I (3rd ed.). London: Oxford University Press.
- Hodgkin, Robert Howard (1952). A History of the Anglo-Saxons. Vol. II (3rd ed.). London: Oxford University Press.
- Hodgkin, Robert Howard (1949). Six Centuries of an Oxford College: A History of the Queen's College, 1340–1940. Oxford: Basil Blackwell.

=== A History of the Anglo-Saxons ===
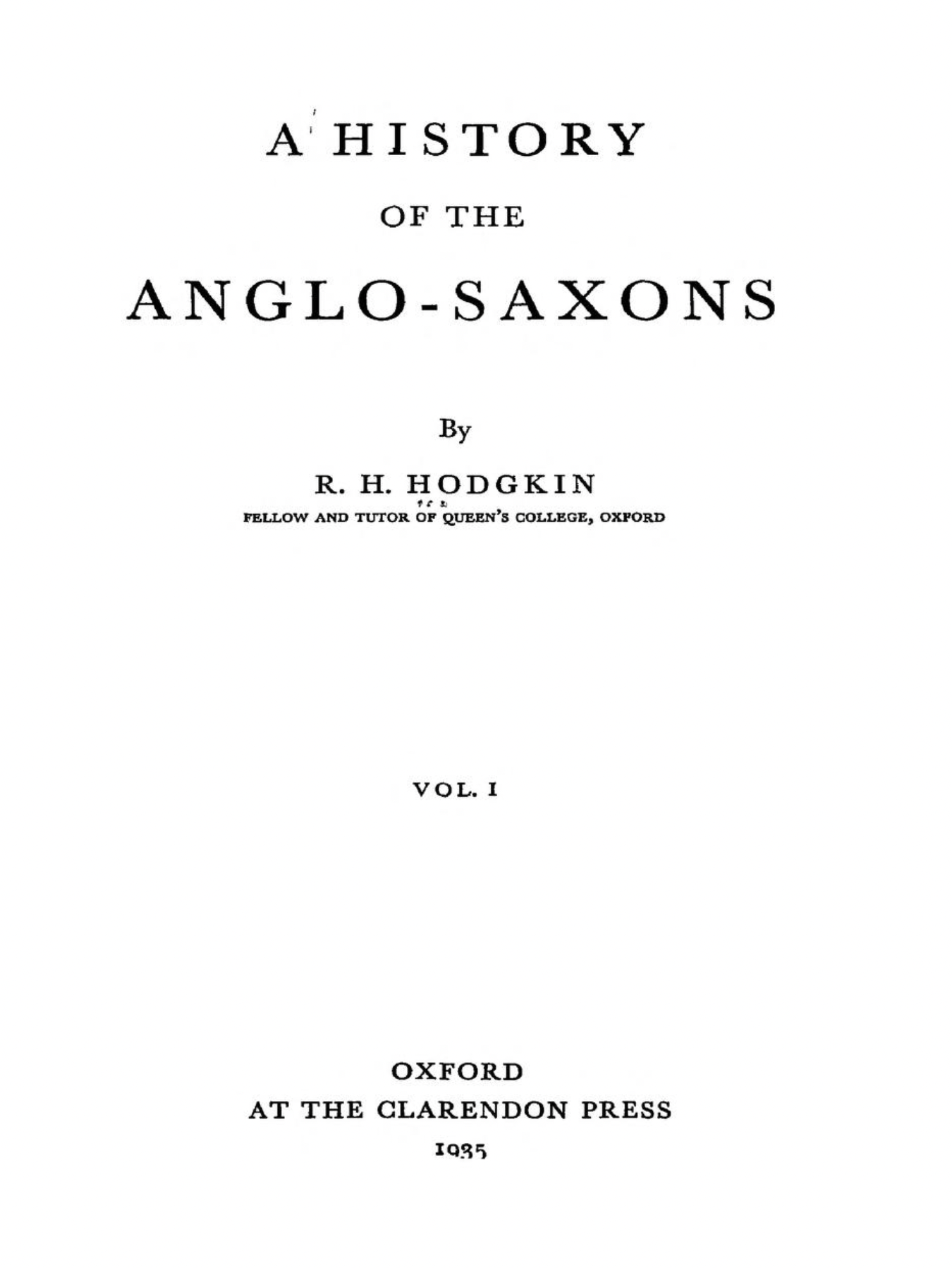
Front cover of the first volume

A History of the Anglo-Saxons was first published in 1935. The two-volume work traced the Anglo-Saxons from their first mentions to the death of Alfred the Great in 899. Noting Hodgkin's father, Charles Wendell David wrote that "[b]eing of the present generation, [Robert Hodgkin's] work necessarily rests more largely on the researches of specialists and is correspondingly more solidly based, but it still has the sweep and roominess and charm with which the elder Hodgkin has made his readers familiar." Reviewers praised Hodgkin's use of archaeological and philological developments, as well as studies of aerial photography and toponymy. T. D. Kendrick praised Hodgkin's "enviable skill in writing", and how the "volumes tell their tale with such clarity, such vigour, and such humour that the reader finds himself anxious to compliment him on the sustained interest of this very long book before paying tribute to the soundness of the author's judgement and the vast trustworthy knowledge that he possesses of all aspects of his subject".

Though it was intended for the more general reader, Francis Peabody Magoun wrote that it "becomes overnight the first history to put in the hands of the serious beginning student of any aspect of English life before the death of Alfred". This balance was criticised by one reviewer, however, who suggested that the book created "a real danger" that it would be used by students as "a heaven-sent labour-saving device", without necessarily doing "full justice to the theories and opinions which he summarises and discusses". Kemp Malone said Hodgkin "writes a somewhat pedestrian but a readable prose", but added "[a]ll in all, his is by far the best general work that we have on the earliest centuries of English culture." According to another reviewer, "Hodgkin deals fearlessly—it might be said ruthlessly—with much of the interpretation of historians treating of this period, who wrote so late as two generations ago."

A second edition, predominantly a corrected version of the first, followed in 1939. Reginald Ralph Darlington wrote that "the appearance of a second edition within four years bears witness to its wide appeal", and Kendrick wrote that the work "is now to be regarded as one of the established great books of our age". A year after Hodgkin's 1951 death, a third edition was published. It was little changed, except for a 48-page appendix on the Sutton Hoo ship-burial authored by Rupert Bruce-Mitford, the assistant keeper of British and Medieval Antiquities of the British Museum. The appendix, Magoun wrote, "is in effect a second interim report which summarizes material scattered through the literature of the intervening years" since Bruce-Mitford's 1946 publication of a report on the find.

=== Six Centuries of an Oxford College ===
Hodgkin's second book, Six Centuries of an Oxford College: A History of the Queen's College, 1340–1940, was published in 1949. The book, wrote one reviewer, told "every thing that is of real significance for the college, from the issue of the Founder's cumbrous statutes to some considerations of the effects of the war of 1939–1945 on the collegiate ideal". Another reviewer wrote that Hodgkin linked "skilfully, and always in close relationship to national history, the varying fortunes of the university and the college and tells of the great men, from John Wyclif to Oliver Franks, whom it has produced or harboured. It is not every college which can boast of two cardinals, one of whom was poisoned by his own chaplain!" According to the first reviewer, the work included "pleasant anecdotes, some shrewd personal judgements and a slight air of nostalgia in the later chapters".

== Bibliography ==
- Creighton, Louise (1918). Life and Letters of Thomas Hodgkin (2nd ed.). London: Longmans, Green, and Co.
- Croft, Andy (2003). Comrade Heart: A Life of Randall Swingler. Manchester: Manchester University Press. ISBN 0-7190-6334-5.
- Cronne, Henry A. (December 1936). "Review: A History of the Anglo-Saxons". History. XXI (83). Historical Association: 258–260. doi:10.1111/j.1468-229X.1936.tb00701.x. JSTOR 24401483.

- Follow-up comments published in Hodgkin, Robert Howard & Cronne, Henry A. (March 1937). "Correspondence: "A History of the Anglo-Saxons"". History. XXI (84). Historical Association: 344–345. doi:10.1111/j.1468-229X.1937.tb00708.x. JSTOR 24401503.

- Darlington, Reginald Ralph (October 1940). "Review: A History of the Anglo-Saxons". The English Historical Review. LV (220): 648–651. JSTOR 554300.
- David, Charles Wendell (October 1936). "Review: A History of the Anglo-Saxons". The American Historical Review. XXII (1). American Historical Association: 99–101. doi:10.2307/1840281. JSTOR 1840281.
- Elliott, Ivo, ed. (1934). "List of Visitor, Master, Fellows, and staff of the College: 1932–3". The Balliol College Register: 1833–1933 (2nd ed.). Oxford: John Johnson at the University Press. pp. 448–451.
- Ferry, Georgina (2014). Dorothy Crowfoot Hodgkin: Patterns, Proteins and Peace, A Life in Science. London: Bloomsbury Reader. ISBN 978-1-4482-1454-9.
- Hodgkin, Dorothy Forster; Holdsworth, Lucy Violet; Jones, Elisabeth Gresford; Bosanquet, Ellen Sophia; Swan, Kenneth; Rendel, George; Brook, V. J. K.; Brook, Marie; Powicke, F. M.; Sykes, Norman; Elton, Godfrey; Smith, John; Haslam Jones, U.; Jameson, Lucy Margaret; Dixon, Alexa Mary; Sutherland, Helen Christian; Hodgkin, Dorothy Mary; Hodgkin, Thomas Lionel & Hodgkin, Edward Christian (1955). Robert Howard Hodgkin: 1877–1951. Gloucester: John Bellows Limited. OCLC 9616797.
- Kendrick, T. D. (October 1935). "Review of A History of the Anglo-Saxons, by Robert Howard Hodgkin". The Antiquaries Journal. XV (4). London: Society of Antiquaries of London: 484–485. doi:10.1017/S0003581500041573. S2CID 163344325.
- Kennedy, Thomas C. (2001). British Quakerism, 1860–1920: The Transformation of a Religious Community. Oxford: Oxford University Press. ISBN 0-19-827035-6.
- Nielson, Francis (April 1943). "The Roots of the Tree of Learning". The American Journal of Economics and Sociology. 2 (3): 305–323. doi:10.1111/j.1536-7150.1943.tb01105.x. JSTOR 3484096.
- Magoun, Francis Peabody (November 1937). "Review: A History of the Anglo-Saxons". Modern Language Notes. LII (7). Johns Hopkins University Press: 510–515. doi:10.2307/2911667. JSTOR 2911667.
- Magoun, Francis Peabody (January 1954). "Review: A History of the Anglo-Saxons". Speculum. XXIX (1). The Mediaeval Academy of America: 125–126. doi:10.2307/2853872. JSTOR 2853872.
- Malone, Kemp (February 1937). "Review: A History of the Anglo-Saxons". Medium Ævum. VI (1). Society for the Study of Mediæval Languages and Literature: 57–60. doi:10.2307/43626025. JSTOR 43626025.
- P., G. R. (January 1950). "Review: Six Centuries of an Oxford College: A History of the Queen's College, 1340–1940". The English Historical Review. LXV (254): 127–128. JSTOR 556566.
- "Proceedings of the Society of Antiquaries". The Antiquaries Journal. XVII (3). London: Society of Antiquaries of London: 359–370. July 1937. doi:10.1017/S0003581500010957. S2CID 246045769.
- "Proceedings of the Society of Antiquaries". The Antiquaries Journal. XXXII (3–4). London: Society of Antiquaries of London: 238–269. July–October 1952. doi:10.1017/S0003581500077234. S2CID 246041892.
- Radford, Courtenay Arthur Ralegh (1936). "Review: A History of the Anglo-Saxons". The Journal of Roman Studies. XXVI (1). Society for the Promotion of Roman Studies: 129–130. doi:10.2307/296743. JSTOR 296743.
- S., F. R. (February–June 1954). "Review: Six Centuries of an Oxford College: A History of the Queen's College, 1340–1940". History: The Journal of the Historical Association. XXXIX (135–136): 142–143. JSTOR 24402830.
- "Statutes of the Queen's College, Oxford: The Provost". Statutes Made for the University of Oxford, and for the Colleges and Halls Therein, by the University of Oxford Commissioners. Oxford: Clarendon Press. 1882. pp. 325–328.
- van Bath, Bernard Hendrik Slicher (July 1949). "Dutch Tribal Problems". Speculum. XXIV (3). The Mediaeval Academy of America: 319–338. doi:10.2307/2848011. JSTOR 2848011. S2CID 161441704.
- Whiting, Bartlett Jere (January 1937). "Review: A History of the Anglo-Saxons". Speculum. XII (1). The Mediaeval Academy of America: 122–124. doi:10.2307/2848672. JSTOR 2848672.
- Wolfers, Michael (2007). Thomas Hodgkin: Wandering scholar. Monmouth, Wales: Merlin Press. ISBN 978-0-85036-580-1.
