= John Hodgkin =

John Hodgkin may refer to:

- John Hodgkin (barrister) (1800–1875), English barrister and Quaker preacher
- John Hodgkin (tutor) (1766–1845), English tutor, grammarian, and calligrapher

== See also ==
- John Hodgkins (died 1560), English suffragan bishop
