= Experimental Biology and Medicine =

Experimental Biology and Medicine may refer to:

- Experimental Biology and Medicine (Karger journal), published from 1967 to 1987 by Karger
- Experimental Biology and Medicine (Frontiers journal), published by Frontiers Media on behalf of the Society for Experimental Biology and Medicine
