= Glenda R. Taylor =

Glenda R Taylor
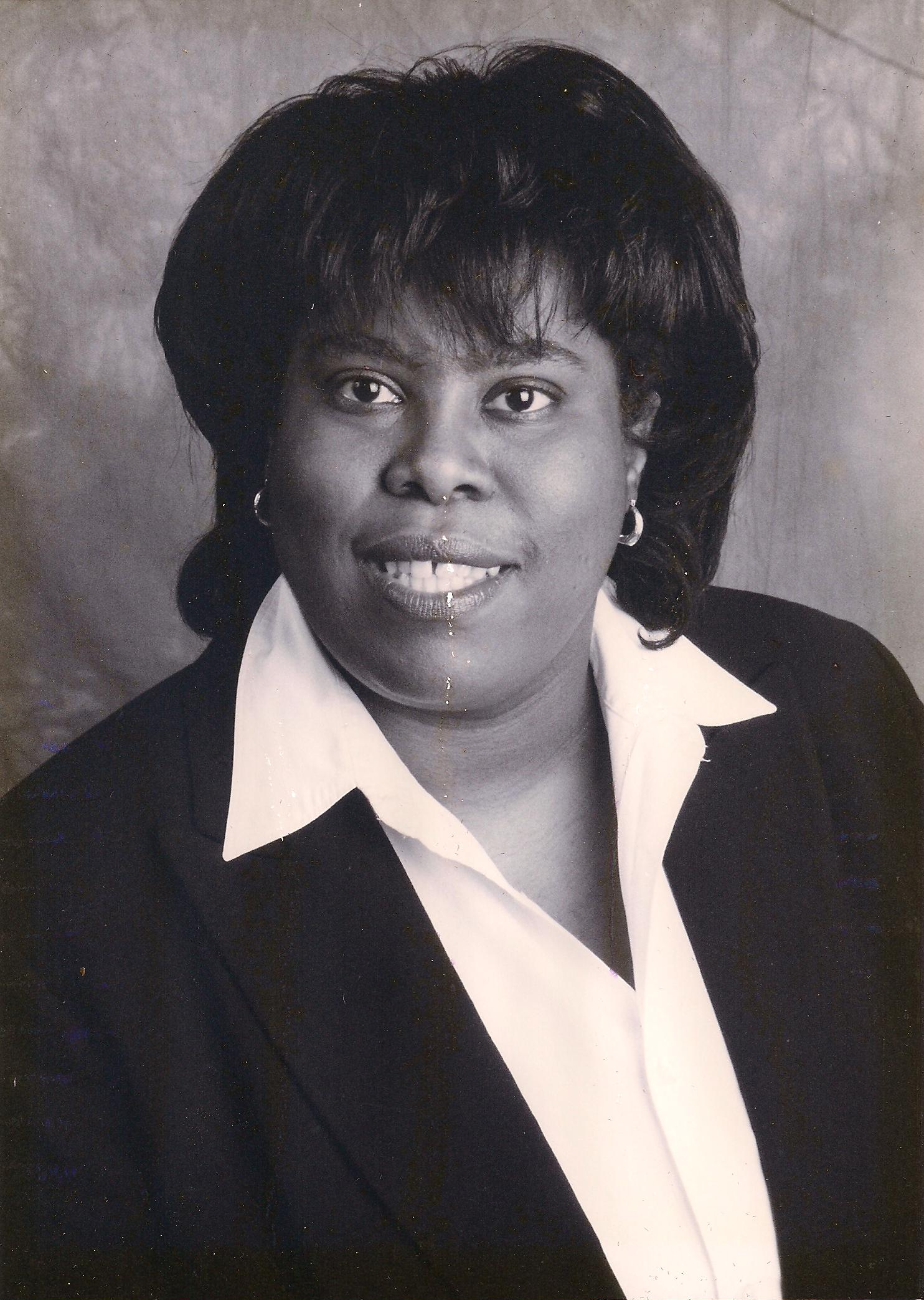
- Born: December 30, 1955 (age 69); Brooklyn, New York

Glenda R. Taylor (born December 30, 1955) is an American author and cultural historian.

== Biography ==
Glenda R. Taylor was born in 1955 in Brooklyn, New York. She is a graduate of Medgar Evers College of the City University of New York, and also studied at the University of Ghana's Institute of African Studies in Accra, Ghana; the University of Science and Technology in Kumasi, Ghana; and Brooklyn College of the City University of New York.

Taylor is the founder of Olympic Vision, a charitable organization, which seeks to provide youth and adults with educational, job placement, mental health and social services. She is a proponent of the John Dewey philosophy which emphasizes the importance of experience in education. organizations and small businesses.

Taylor is the editor of The Secrets of Success: Quotations by African American Achievers and co-editor of The Secrets of Success: The Black Man’s Perspective (New York Network Journal). Her most recent book (co-edited with Mary J. Taylor) is titled, "Truth Beyond Illusion:African American Women 1860s-1950s". Taylor has received a Certificate for Outstanding Service to Youth from the New York State Division for Youth, and is one of the first recipients of the Network Journal's 25 Most Influential Women In Business Award. In 2005, Taylor received the Harriet Tubman Award for her contribution to the non-profit sector.
