= Francis Peyton Rous =

American scientist (1879–1970)

- Francis Peyton Rous
- Born: October 5, 1879; Baltimore, Maryland, U.S.
- Died: February 16, 1970 (aged 90); New York City, U.S.
- Education: Johns Hopkins University
- Known for: Oncoviruses
- Spouse: Marion Eckford de Kay
- Children: Three daughters, including Marion
- Awards: Albert Lasker Award for Basic Medical Research (1958); National Medal of Science (1965); Paul Ehrlich and Ludwig Darmstaedter Prize (1966); Nobel Prize in Physiology or Medicine (1966)
- Scientific career
- Fields: Virology
- Workplaces: University of Michigan, Rockefeller Institute for Medical Research

Francis Peyton Rous ForMemRS (/raʊs/; October 5, 1879 – February 16, 1970) was an American pathologist at the Rockefeller University known for his works in oncoviruses, blood transfusion and physiology of digestion. A medical graduate from the Johns Hopkins University, he was discouraged from becoming a practicing physician due to severe tuberculosis. After three years of working as an instructor of pathology at the University of Michigan, he became dedicated researcher at the Rockefeller Institute for Medical Research for the rest of his career.

His discovery in 1911 that a chicken tumor was caused by a virus (later named Rous sarcoma virus) led to more discoveries and understanding of the role of viruses in the development of certain types of cancer. He was awarded a Nobel Prize in Physiology or Medicine for his work in 1966, 55 years after his initial discovery and he remains the oldest recipient of the Nobel Prize in Medicine or Physiology.

He and Joseph R. Turner studied methods to make use of blood types for blood transfusion. During World War I, they developed a technique for preserving blood sample by using an acid, citrate. This enabled the first practical storage of blood samples for transfusion and was introduced by Oswald H. Robertson at the front line in Belgium in 1917 as the world's first blood bank.

== Early life and education ==
Rous was born in Baltimore, Maryland, to Charles Rous and Frances Anderson née Wood. He had two younger sisters. His father, a grain broker, died when he was 11 years of age. He studied at the local public schools up to secondary education. He received a scholarship to Johns Hopkins University from where he obtained a B.A. degree in 1900. He immediately took up medicine at the Johns Hopkins School of Medicine.

While in the second year at the medical school, Rous contracted tuberculosis through his injured finger while performing an autopsy. A tuberculous bone (axillary tuberculous lymphadenitis) developed in his armpit and was surgically removed. He was given leave from the medical school for recovery. His uncle got him a job as a cowboy at a cattle ranch in Texas, where he worked for a year. He was able to resume his medical course in 1904. Due to the disease, he considered himself as unfit to be a physician, or a "real doctor," for which he focused his interest in medical research. He obtained an M.D. degree in 1905.

== Career and research ==
After completing an internship, Rous joined the University of Michigan as an instructor of pathology. Alfred Warthin, head of the pathology department, advised him to study German to pursue specialised pathological course in Germany. To earn extra salary, Warthin arranged for him temporary teaching position at the summer school. He published his first technical paper on white blood cell analysis in the Proceedings of the Society for Experimental Biology and Medicine (now Experimental Biology and Medicine) in 1906. In 1907, he went to Germany for a training course on morbid anatomy at Friedrichstadt Municipal Hospital (Krankenhaus Dresden-Friedrichstadt) in Dresden under Christian Georg Schmorl.

On his way home from Germany, he showed symptoms of pulmonary tuberculosis and was sent to the Adirondack Mountains in northeastern Upstate New York for recovery. After his return in 1908, Warthin informed him of a Rockefeller Scholarship for cancer research at the Rockefeller Institute for Medical Research (now Rockefeller University) in New York. Using the grants, he studied lymphocytes on which he published a series of papers in 1908. Simon Flexner, director of the Rockefeller Institute and editor of the Experimental Biology and Medicine which published his papers, recognized his research interest and offered him to lead cancer research at the institute. In 1909, he joined the laboratories as a full-time researcher at Rockefeller. In 1920, he was appointed Member of the Rockefeller Institute, and became Member Emeritus in 1945, the position he occupied till his death.

=== Cancer ===
Rous started his Rockefeller research on the tumors in rodents, and turned to that of chicken (specifically, a sarcoma) in the early 1910. A woman brought him a Plymouth Rock hen which had developed a "large irregularly globular mass" on its right breast two months earlier. He identified the tumor as a "spindle-celled sarcoma." After several experiments of attempting to see the effect of the tumor exudate on healthy chicken, he realized that he could induce the same tumour in healthy chickens of the same breed only, so that genetic relatedness was important for the specific tumor. His first report in May 1910 on spontaneous chicken tumor established the first avian tumor that was transplantable to other individuals. Speculating the medical importance, he noted that "there is no reason to suspect on these points [of growth and transmission] that the neoplasm will differ from the better-known tumors of mammals."

He continued to maintain and transplant the tumor in different individuals. In 1911, he made a seminal observation that cell-free filtrate (using Berkefeld filter that separate bacteria and large microbes) of chicken sarcoma could produce a malignant tumor when transferred to other chickens, describing:

A transmissible sarcoma of the chicken has been under observation in this laboratory for the past fourteen months, and it has assumed of late a special interest because of its extreme malignancy and a tendency to wide-spread metastasis... small quantities of a cell-free filtrate have sufficed to transmit the growth to susceptible fowls.

This finding, that cancer could be transmitted by a virus (now known as the Rous sarcoma virus, a retrovirus), was widely discredited by most of the field's experts at that time as "utter nonsense" as it was a medically accepted fact that cancer was not an infection. As recorded by Charles Oberling:

Tumor pathology was then completely under the spell of the German school of pathologic anatomy which, probably as an aftermath of the antagonism between Robert Koch and [Rudolf] Virchow, was utterly opposed to any theory of an infectious origin of cancer. And suddenly, in opposition to all these dignified and bearded Herren Professoren who firmly believed what they said, rose the voice of a young American who claimed to have transmitted by a cell-free filtrate a neoplasm—a chicken sarcoma. Of course this could not be true, and for years they did not even try to repeat his experiments.

He was even accused of using faulty technique and contaminating the tumor samples with cancer cells. However, he was convinced that the malignancy was as those of any other cancer cells, the only difference being that it could be produced by a cell-free filtrate of a tumor. Experiments he continued with James B. Murphy and published made conclusive evidences for the cancerous nature of the infection. An experiment they did with W.H. Tytler in 1912 gave the first clue of virus as the filterable agent, but failed to make an exact identification.

Rous continued to work on cancer up to 1915, after which he gave up due to failure to obtain other carcinogenic agents from chicken and mice, and general acceptance of his discovery. After 18 years, he returned to cancer research upon the request of a colleague Richard Shope. In 1933, Shope had discovered that a skin tumor (papilloma) in cottontail rabbits was due to a filterable virus, later known as Shope papilloma virus, and showed in 1935 that the virus was transmissible in healthy rabbits. Shope realized the similarity as a cancer agent with Rous's virus and requested Rous for further investigation. Rous obliged and soon reported on the details Shope papilloma virus. From his initial study, he knew that such tumor can "undergo progressive changes in the direction of malignancy when they grow vigorously." His research during the next three decades helped to confirm that viral papilloma can lead to cancers.

The virus nature of the Rous sarcoma was shown by William Ewart Gye of the National Institute for Medical Research at Hampstead in 1925. The carcinogenic property was widely accepted after the discovery of the oncogene in 1960, the exact gene of which was identified in the 1970s as src.

=== Blood transfusion ===
The outbreak of World War I inspired Rous to turn his attention to blood transfusion, as he learned soldiers were dying at the war fronts due to blood loss. In 1915, he collaborated with Joseph R. Turner to work on the methods of blood transfusion. That year, they devised a method for testing blood compatibility to avoid complications in transfusion. Although an Austrian physician Karl Landsteiner had discovered blood types a decade earlier, the practical usage was not yet developed, as Rous described: "The fate of Landsteiner's effort to call attention to the practical bearing of the group differences in human bloods provides an exquisite instance of knowledge marking time on technique. Transfusion was still not done because (until at least 1915), the risk of clotting was too great."

He and Turner also successfully developed a technique for prolonged blood preservation initially by adding gelatine in the blood sample. In 1916, they replaced the additive with a citrate-glucose solution which extended blood storage from one week to two weeks. The use of citrate was the key to the beginning of modern blood transfusion. At the time, blood transfusion was by direct person-to-person so that the preservation method allowed transfusion in the absence of a donor. An English physician Oswald H. Robertson, serving in the US Army, brought the new technique to Belgium in 1917. It became the world's first blood bank.

=== Physiology ===
Rous also made important contributions in the physiology of digestion focussing on the liver and gall bladder. With Louise D. Larimore, he described the conditions leading to liver damage and the effect on bile secretion. He and Philip D. McMaster worked out the main function of gall bladder as the site of bile concentration. He showed that bile was concentrated by the gallbladder from water as it is released from the liver, and this also helped to the understanding of diseases associated with bile secretions, such as jaundice and gallstone formation.

== Awards and honors ==
Rous was elected a member of the United States National Academy of Sciences in 1927 and a member of the American Philosophical Society in 1939. He was elected a Foreign Member of the Royal Society (ForMemRS) in 1940. He received the Albert Lasker Award for Basic Medical Research in 1958 and the National Medal of Science in 1965. He was also member of the Royal Society of Medicine, the Royal Danish Academy of Sciences and Letters, and the Norwegian Academy of Science and Letters. He was appointed honorary fellow of the Weizmann Institute of Science and foreign correspondent of the Académie Nationale de Médecine in Paris. He also received the Kovalenko Medal of the National Academy of Sciences, the Distinguished Service Award of the American Cancer Society, the United Nations Prize for Cancer Research, and the Paul Ehrlich and Ludwig Darmstaedter Prize from the Federal Republic of Germany.

Rous shared the Nobel Prize in Physiology or Medicine in 1966 with Charles Brenton Huggins "for his discovery of tumour-inducing viruses." As early as 1926, Karl Landsteiner had nominated him and subsequently received other 16 nominations up to 1951, but was selected 55 years after his initial discovery at the age of 87, and he is recorded as the oldest recipient of the Nobel Prize in Medicine or Physiology. His remains "the longest 'incubation period' in the 110 years history of the Nobel Prizes in Physiology or Medicine."

== Personal life ==
Rous married Marion Eckford de Kay in 1915, who survived him by fifteen years before her own death in 1985. He had three daughters, Marion (Marni), Ellen and Phoebe. Marni (1917–2015) was a children's book editor and the wife of another Nobel Prize winner, Alan Lloyd Hodgkin. Phoebe married Thomas J. Wilson, director of the Harvard University Press.

In his later life he wrote biographies of Simon Flexner and Karl Landsteiner.

=== Death ===
Rous died in 1970 of abdominal cancer at the Memorial Sloan Kettering Cancer Center in New York. His wife died in 1985.
