= Harry Ashby (engraver) =

- Born: 17 April 1744; Wotton-under-Edge, Gloucestershire, England
- Died: 31 August 1818 (aged 74); Exning, Suffolk, England
- Occupation: Writing-engraver

Harry Ashby (17 April 1744 – 31 August 1818) was an English writing-engraver.

== Early life ==
Ashby was born on 17 April 1744 at Wotton-under-Edge, Gloucestershire, and was apprenticed to a clockmaker in that town, who also engraved dial-plates, spoons, and tankards. Here Ashby imbibed a taste for engraving. On the termination of his apprenticeship he removed to London, where, following the bent of his inclination for writing-engraving, he entered into an engagement with Mr. Jefferies, geographer, of Charing Cross, his principal employment being to engrave titles for maps and charts.

== Career ==
Subsequently, Ashby worked for John Spilsbury, writing-engraver, of Russell Court, Drury Lane, to whose business he eventually succeeded, and whose widow he married. Ashby was employed by provincial, colonial, and foreign bankers, to engrave notes and bills. Some penmen also gave scope to his skill as an engraver of specimens of calligraphy. Among the works for which he engraved the plates are:

- John Hodgkin, Calligraphia Græca, 1794;
- William Milns, Penman's Repository, 1795;
- Hodgkin, Specimens of Greek Penmanship, 1804;
- H. Genery, Geographical and Commercial Copies, 1805;
- Richard Langford, Beauties of Penmanship, 1825 (?); and
- some of the plates in Thomas Tomkins, Beauties of Writing, 1809.

== Death ==
In his later years, Ashby lived in retirement at Exning, Suffolk, where he died on 31 August 1818, at the age of 74.
