= Joanna Hines =

British author

- Born: Joanna Hodgkin; London
- Education: Somerville College, Oxford
- Occupation: writer
- Relatives: Hodgkin family
- Writing career
- Language: London
- Genre: novel
- Notable work: Improvising Carla

Joanna Hines is a British author of fiction and non-fiction. She has published a number of acclaimed novels, including Improvising Carla which was dramatised for UK television. She studied at Somerville College, Oxford. She was a Royal Literary Fund fellow at St Mary's University.

Her mother, Nancy Isobel Myers, was the first wife of writer Lawrence Durrell. She now publishes non-fiction under her maiden name, Joanna Hodgkin.

== Works ==
=== Fiction ===
- Dora's Room London : Coronet Books, 1993. ISBN 9780340583999, OCLC 477473668
- The Fifth Secret London : Hodder, 1995
- Autumn of Strangers London : Hodder, 1997
- Improvising Carla London : Simon & Schuster, 2000. ISBN 9780684860527, OCLC 226098107
- Surface Tension London : Simon & Schuster, 2002. ISBN 9780684860534, OCLC 473284430
- Angels of the Flood London : Simon & Schuster, 2004. ISBN 9780743247993, OCLC 440686374
- The Murder Bird New York : Pocket Books, 2007. ISBN 9780743468732, OCLC 851989065
- The Cornish Girl London : Hodder, 1994
- The Puritan's Wife London : Hodder, 1996
- The Lost Daughter London : Hodder, 1999

=== Non-fiction ===
(as Joanna Hodgkin)

- Amateurs in Eden London : Virago, 2012. ISBN 9781844087945, OCLC 829172719
- Tell Me Who I Am London : Hodder 2013 co authored with Alex and Marcus Lewis.

Tell Me Who I Am was released as a documentary for Netflix in 2019.
