= Hodgkin cycle =

Representation of biological membrane depolarization

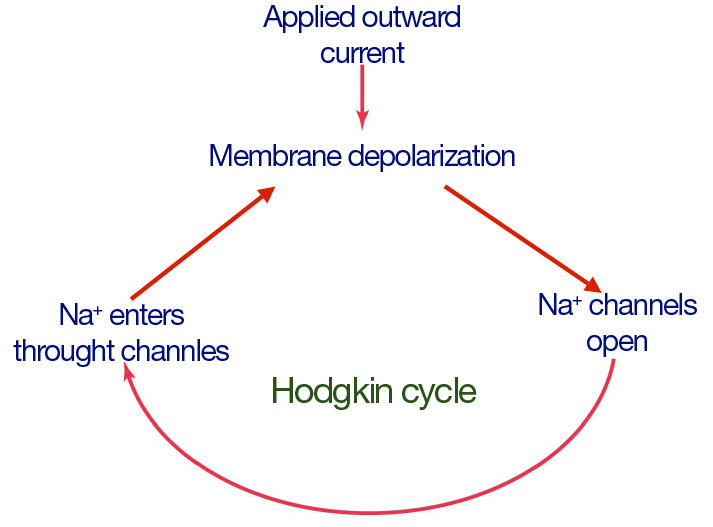

In membrane biology, the Hodgkin cycle is a key component of membrane physiology that describes bioelectrical impulses, especially prevalent in neural and muscle tissues. It was identified by British physiologist and biophysicist Sir Alan Lloyd Hodgkin.

The Hodgkin cycle represents a positive feedback loop in which an initial membrane depolarization leads to uncontrolled deflection of the membrane potential to near V_{Na}. The initial depolarization must reach or surpass a certain threshold in order to activate voltage-gated Na^{+} channels. The opening of Na^{+} channels allows Na^{+} inflow, which, in turn, further depolarizes the membrane. Additional depolarization activates additional Na^{+} channels. This cycle leads to a very rapid rise in Na^{+} conductance (g_{Na}), which moves the membrane potential close to V_{Na}. The cycle is broken when the membrane potential reaches to the sodium equilibrium potential and potassium channels open to re-polarize the membrane potential. This positive feedback loop means that the closer these voltage-gated Na^{+} channels are to each other, the lower the threshold of activation.

== Importance in cell physiology ==
An understanding of membrane physiology is needed in order to understand how cells communicate with one another. Signalling between cells, such as neurons for example, revolves around changes in the electrical potentials across their membranes. In a healthy cell at rest, the intracellular area is usually negatively charged relative to the extracellular region. Depolarization refers to when the intracellular region is neutralized to be at the same voltage relative to the extracellular region. The concentration of sodium ions is intimately related to the electrical potential across a membrane. Depolarization often occurs via the influx of sodium ions to the intracellular region. Given that sodium ions have a positive charge, the intracellular region becomes less negatively charged relative to the extracellular region.
