= Marni Hodgkin =

American children's book editor

- Born: Marion Rous; 28 November 1917; New York City, US
- Died: 11 March 2015 (aged 97); Cambridge, England
- Education: Swarthmore College
- Occupation: Children's book editor
- Years active: 1950–1978
- Employer: Macmillan Publishers
- Spouse: Alan Lloyd Hodgkin
- Children: 4
- Parent(s): Francis Peyton Rous; Marion de Kay

Marion "Marni" Hodgkin, Lady Hodgkin (28 November 1917 – 11 March 2015) was an American children's book editor. She was regarded as one of the notable and influential children's book editors of the 1960s. She was the daughter of Francis Peyton Rous and wife of Alan Lloyd Hodgkin, both Nobel Prize winners.

== Early life ==
Born Marion Rous in New York City, she was the eldest of three daughters of the American pathologist Francis Peyton Rous, winner of the 1966 Nobel Prize in Physiology or Medicine, and his wife, Marion de Kay. She studied at the Dalton School in New York City, and Swarthmore College in Pennsylvania.

== Career ==
Hodgkin's career as a children's book editor started in New York, working for Viking Press. She then worked for Rupert Hart-Davis in London.

Hodgkin became Children's Book Editor at Macmillan Publishing Company, which she joined in 1966. Until her arrival, Macmillan had never had a children's literature department, even though its authors included Lewis Carroll and Rudyard Kipling. Picture books that she edited included Kevin Crossley-Holland's The Green Children (1969) and Graham Oakley's Church Mouse series. She rejected Roald Dahl's work twice. She retired from Macmillan in 1978 when her husband was named master of Trinity College, Cambridge.

She was a successful writer of children's literature in her own right, including Young Winter's Tales, Student Body (1950), and Dead Indeed (1955). The last two were detective stories, based on her time at Swarthmore College and Viking Press, respectively.

== Personal ==
She married Alan Lloyd Hodgkin in 1944; they had met while he was working at the Rockefeller Institute in 1938. They had three daughters and one son. Jonathan Hodgkin became a molecular biologist at Cambridge University. Deborah Hodgkin is a psychologist. Her husband, Alan Lloyd Hodgkin, won the Nobel Prize for Physiology in 1963.

She died on 11 March 2015 at the age of 97 in Cambridge, England.
