= Lucy Violet Hodgkin =

English author (1869–1954)

Lucy Violet Hodgkin (married name Holdsworth, 1869–1954) was an English author.

She was born on 19 March 1869 in Benwell Dene, Newcastle upon Tyne, the eldest of six children of historian Thomas Hodgkin and his wife Lucy, née Fox. She was educated at home. As a child, she helped her father with his writing. She then began writing Quaker-related biographies and children’s stories, sometimes under the names L. Violet Hodgkin or L.V. Hodgkin.

Hodgkin was a friend of Mary Coleridge, and introduced Coleridge’s poetry to Robert Bridges.

In 1909, the Hodgkin family visited the Holdsworth family in Havelock North, New Zealand, where Hodgkin had a profound experience of silent worship. She wrote about silent worship in several articles in The British Friend and in the 1919 Swarthmore Lecture, titled ‘Silent Worship: the Way of Wonder.’

In 1922, she married John Holdsworth and returned to New Zealand. Her journal concerning colonial New Zealand was published in 2000.

Hodgkin was profoundly deaf and communicated by lip-reading and pencil and paper.

She died on 6 April 1954.

== Works ==
- Pilgrims in Palestine (1890)
- The Happy World: Notes on the Mystic Imagery of the Paradiso of Dante (1902)
- A Book of Quaker Saints (1917)
- The Lark’s Nest (1920)
- George Hodgkin's Life and Letters (1921)
- Loveday Hambly and her Guests (1927)
- The Romance of the Inward Light (1932)
- Anima, the Pilgrim of the Cross (1933)
- A Day-book of Counsel and Comfort from the Epistles of George Fox (1937)
- Seas of the Moon (memoir, 1946)
- The Shoemaker of Dover (1943)
- In Quietness: Thoughts on Silent Worship (1945)
- Gulielma: Wife of William Penn (1947)
- Fierce Feathers and Other Stories (short story collection published posthumously, 1965)
- View of the bay: its inhabitants seen through the eyes of the 53-year-old Lucy Violet Holdsworth, the newly-wed wife of John Holdsworth of 'Swarthmoor' in Havelock North: from her journal (ed. Jim and Audrey Brodie, 2000)
