= Institute of African Studies =

Interdisciplinary research institute in Ghana

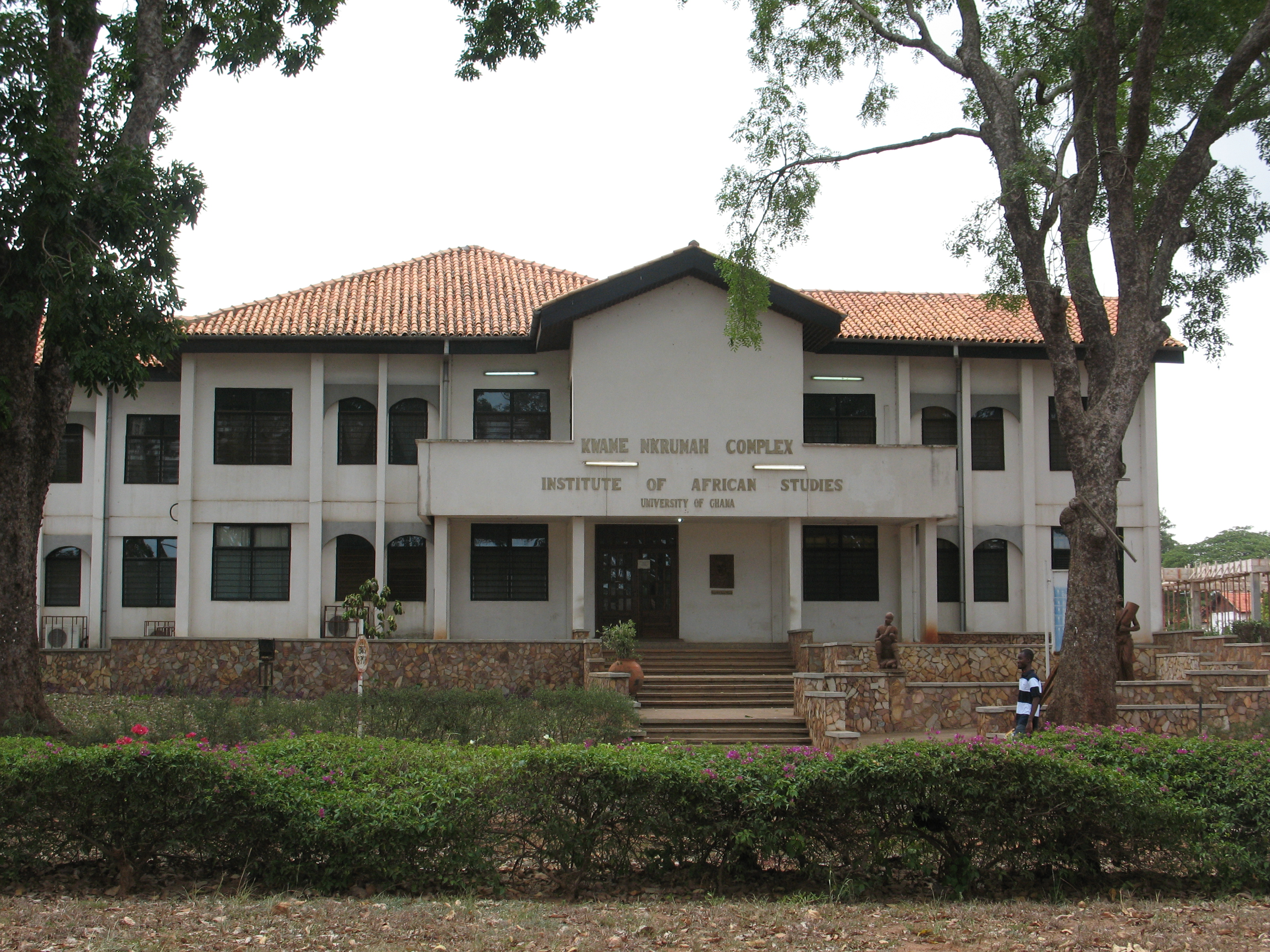
- Website: ias.ug.edu.gh

The Institute of African Studies, on the Anne Jiagee Road on the campus of the University of Ghana at Legon, is an interdisciplinary research institute in the humanities and social sciences. It was established by President Kwame Nkrumah in 1962 to encourage African studies.

Thomas Lionel Hodgkin served as the first Director, from 1962 to 1965. On 25 October 1963, President Nkrumah gave an inaugural address at the institute, entitled "The African Genius", in which he called for the recovery of African traditions and an African-centered approach to knowledge.

== Location ==
- The Institute of African Studies is located on the main Legon campus of the University of Ghana. The institute has an old site and a new site. The New Site, 100 meters from the main entrance to the Legon campus, houses the institute's administration and the offices of most of its faculty members.
- The Old Site houses the institute's Library, Printing Unit, Publications Unit and Store, Offices for the Ghana Dance Ensemble and the J. H. Kwabena Nketia Archives, as well as offices of some international programmes.

The Institute issues a peer-reviewed journal, Research Review of the Institute of African Studies. This journal is now known as the Contemporary Journal of African Studies.
