= Jonathan Hodgkin =

British biochemist

Jonathan Hodgkin FRS
- Born: Jonathan Alan Hodgkin; 1949 (age 76–77)
- Education: University of Oxford (BA); University of Cambridge (PhD)
- Awards: Edward Novitski Prize (2017)
- Scientific career
- Workplaces: Laboratory of Molecular Biology
- Thesis: Genetic and Anatomical Aspects of the Caenorhabditis elegans Male (1974)
- Notable students: Magdalena Skipper
- Website: www.keble.ox.ac.uk/academics/about/professor-j-hodgkin

Jonathan Alan Hodgkin (born 1949) FRS is a British biochemist. He is the Professor of Genetics at the University of Oxford and an emeritus fellow of Keble College, Oxford.

== Education ==
Hodgkin was educated at the University of Oxford where he graduated in 1971. He was awarded a PhD from the University of Cambridge in 1974 for research on the genetics of the worm Caenorhabditis elegans.

== Career and research ==
Hodgkin was a scientist at the Medical Research Council (MRC) Laboratory of Molecular Biology in Cambridge. Hodgkin was one of the earliest researchers to explore the genetics of development in the nematode worm Caenorhabditis elegans. He first unraveled the genetic and maturational events in worm sex determination before extending his interest to other developmental pathways, behaviour and immunity.

Most Caenorhabditis elegans worms are self-fertilizing hermaphrodites, with two X chromosomes, but X0 males can also arise spontaneously, permitting genetic crosses. Hodgkin used genetic mutations in this tiny, fast-breeding species to define the regulatory cascade of genes that controls the development of male or hermaphrodite characteristics providing a model for approaching development in other species.

Since 2000, Hodgkin has focused on the nematode's response to attack by bacteria, exploring highly conserved pathways of innate immunity that are also relevant to development. Through microarray analysis, he has identified antibacterial factors produced by the worm that could be candidates for new antibiotics. He has also discovered novel pathogenic bacteria that attack nematodes, which may have potential as biological pest control agents against parasitic nematodes.

=== Awards and honours ===
Hodgkin was elected a Fellow of the Royal Society (FRS) in 1990. In 2011, he received The Genetics Society Medal. Hodgkin was a member of the Faculty of 1000. He was awarded the Edward Novitski Prize by the Genetics Society of America in 2017.

== Personal life ==
Hodgkin is the son of Nobel laureate Alan Lloyd Hodgkin and the editor Marni Hodgkin.
