= Eliot Hodgkin =

English painter

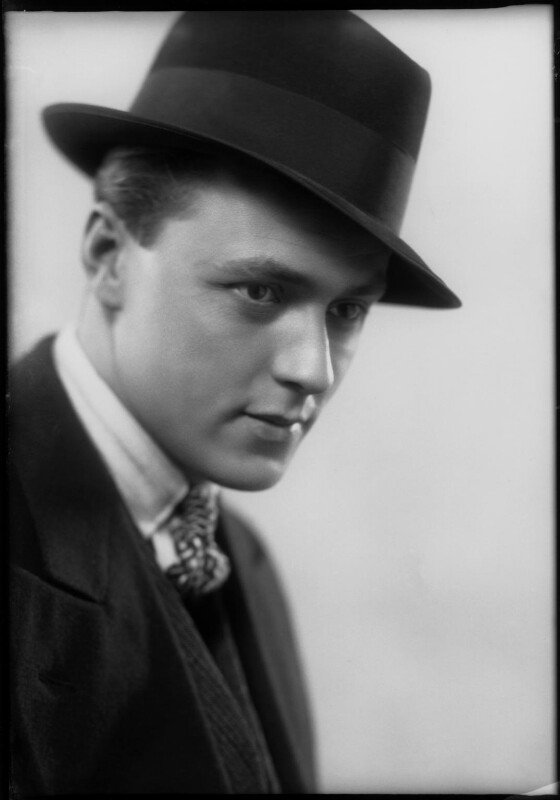
- Hodgkin in 1931
- Born: Curwen Eliot Hodgkin; 19 June 1905; Purley-on-Thames, England
- Died: 30 May 1987 (aged 81); London, England
- Education: Byam Shaw School of Art, Royal Academy Schools
- Known for: Painting
- Spouse(s): Mimi Hodgkin (1940–1987)
- Website: eliothodgkin.com

Eliot Hodgkin (19 June 1905 – 30 May 1987) was an English painter, best known for his highly detailed still lifes executed either in tempera or oil.

== Early life ==
Curwen Eliot Hodgkin was born at Purley Lodge, Purley-on-Thames, near Pangbourne, Berkshire on 19 June 1905, the only son of Alice Jane (née Brooke) and Charles Ernest Hodgkin. The Hodgkins were a Quaker family and were related to Roger Fry. The scientist Thomas Hodgkin was his great-grandfather's older brother and the abstract painter Howard Hodgkin (1932–2017) was his cousin.

Hodgkin was educated at Harrow School from 1919 to 1923. His artistic life started in London at the Byam Shaw School of Art and at the Royal Academy Schools under Francis Ernest Jackson. Hodgkin began with oil painting in the late 1920s and in 1937 he started painting in tempera.

== Career ==
By the middle of the 1930s Hodgkin had established himself as a painter of still lifes, landscapes and murals, exhibiting regularly at the Royal Academy. His first one-man exhibition was in London at Picture Hire Ltd. in 1936. Shortly afterwards he began working in egg tempera.

During World War II Hodgkin was working in the Home Intelligence Division of the Ministry of Information, and proposed making some drawings of plants growing in London's bomb sites. Some originals were seen in March 1945, and as a result, he was offered a 35-guinea commission as part of the War Artists Scheme. Two pictures were delivered in July, and one was accepted.

In 1959 he turned down the opportunity of becoming an Academician, but continued to exhibit at the Royal Academy throughout his career, exhibiting a total of 113 paintings at the Royal Academy Summer Exhibitions between 1934 and 1981.

Hodgkin had one-man shows at the Leicester Galleries, New English Art Club, Picture Hire Galleries, Royal Society of British Artists, Arthur Jeffress Gallery and Agnew's, Wildenstein, and in New York at Durlacher Bros.

Eliot was also a writer. His books include She Closed the Door (1931), Fashion Drawing (1932), 55 Views of London (1948) and A Pictorial Gospel (1949).

In 1979 Hodgkin stopped painting because of worsening eyesight.

== Interest and style ==
Eliot Hodgkin provided a brief description of his interest in still life painting in 1957, in response to an enquiry from the editors of The Studio: "In so far as I have any conscious purpose, it is to show the beauty of natural objects which are normally thought uninteresting or even unattractive: such things as Brussels sprouts, turnips, onions, pebbles and flints, bulbs, dead leaves, bleached vertebrae, an old boot cast up by the tide. People sometimes tell me that they had never really ‘seen’ something before I painted it, and I should like to believe this... For myself, if I must put it into words, I try to look at quite simple things as though I were seeing them for the first time and as though no one had ever painted them before."

In a letter written to Sir Brinsley Ford, Hodgkin wrote: "I like to show the beauty of things that no one looks at twice."

Hodgkin began painting in tempera in about 1937, using a medium based on a recipe given to him by Maxwell Armfield (1881–1972), his friend and former teacher. In 1967 Hodgkin contributed an article "How I Paint in Tempera" to "Tempera: Yearbook of the Society of Painters in Tempera", in which he wrote: "Tempera has no attraction for me simply because it was used by the Italian primitives, most of whose work does not greatly appeal to me. I use it because it is the only way in which I can express the character of the objects that fascinate me. With oil paint I could not get the detail without getting also a disagreeable surface: moreover I should have to wait while the paint dried before continuing."

Eliot wrote in the R.W.S. catalogue, 1946: 'Why tempera?... Because tempera enables me most nearly to achieve the effects I am aiming at... I try to show things exactly as they are, yet with some of their mystery and poetry, and as though seen for the first time. And it seems to me that, in trying to depict "a World in a grain of sand", perhaps the best medium is tempera, because it combines clarity and definition with a certain feeling of remoteness.'

== Personal life ==
On 24 April 1940, Hodgkin married Maria Clara (Mimi) Henderson (née Franceschi), his lifetime partner. In April 1941 they had their only son, Max.

During the last years of his life Hodgkin suffered from a crippling disease, described as an ataxia of unknown origin.

== Death and legacy ==
Eliot died on 30 May 1987 at the age of 81 and his ashes are buried at St John's Notting Hill.

After Hodgkin's death in 1987, Hazlitt, Gooden & Fox did a retrospective exhibition in 1990. In 2019, after almost 30 years, Brought to Life: Eliot Hodgkin Rediscovered was the first major exhibition of the artist's works, and took place in Waddesdon Manor.
