= John Hodgkin (barrister) =

British lawyer

John Hodgkin (11 March 1800 – 5 July 1875) was an English barrister and Quaker preacher.

== Life ==
The son of John Hodgkin, he was born at Pentonville, London, on 11 March 1800. He and his older brother Thomas Hodgkin were educated at home, partly by their father; John Stuart Mill was one of the few associates of their boyhood. His youth and middle life were passed at Tottenham.

John Hodgkin became a pupil of George Harrison, a Quaker conveyancer, of the school of Richard Preston and Peter Bellinger Brodie. As a conveyancer Hodgkin was in the same tradition, which aimed at concision, at a time when legal documents were still often diffuse. He obtained a large practice, but was best known as a teacher of the law; his chambers had many pupils, with whom he read for an hour daily. They included Joseph Bevan Braithwaite, James Hope-Scott (who was also with William Plunkett of the Temple), and Frederick Prideaux.

Hodgkin rarely appeared in court except to uphold an opinion which he had given on a disputed question of title; and at the age of 43, after a serious illness, he retired from the legal profession, and devoted the remainder of his life to religious and philanthropic work. He visited Quaker congregations in Ireland, France, and America, and was for two years clerk to their yearly meeting.

At the time of the Irish famine of 1845–6 Hodgkin assisted in the work of the relief committees established by Quakers in Dublin and London. He struggled long, but in the end unsuccessfully, to introduce improved methods of fishing among the seafaring population of the Claddagh near Galway. He also had a large share in the preparation of the Encumbered Estates Act (1849), a measure which, as he hoped, would remove some of the economic troubles under which Ireland was labouring. The position of one of the judges of the court founded by this act was offered to him by Lord John Russell, but he declined it.

Hodgkin moved at the age of 58 to Lewes, where he resided. A visit to America in 1861 coincided with the outbreak of the American Civil War which made the position of the Quakers difficulty: the two major "testimonies", against war and against slavery, tended to draw them in opposite directions. During the last ten or twelve years of his life he took an active part in the proceedings of the Social Science congress. He died at Bournemouth on 5 July 1875, aged 75.

== Works ==
Hodgkin was an advocate of legal reform, and published about 1827 a pamphlet entitled Observations on the Establishment of a General Register of Titles, advocating such a measure.

== Family ==
Hodgkin was three times married, and left children by each marriage. His first wife was Elizabeth, daughter of Luke Howard. Their first son was John Eliot Hodgkin, an engineer and antiquary; the historian Thomas Hodgkin was their second son. One daughter, Mariabella, married Edward Fry; another, Elizabeth, married Alfred Waterhouse. Elizabeth died during childbirth of their fifth child (who died soon thereafter) in 1835.

Hodgkin then married Ann Backhouse (1815–1845), who died after a few years; Jonathan Backhouse Hodgkin (1843–1926) was their son. His third wife was Elizabeth Haughton Hodgkin (1818–1904); they had six children.
