= Experimental Biology and Medicine (Karger journal) =

- Discipline: Biology, medicine
- Language: English

Publication details
- Former name(s): Issues in Biomedicine
- History: 1967–1987; 1990–1991
- Publisher: Karger Publishers
- Frequency: Irregular

Standard abbreviations
- ISO 4: Exp. Biol. Med.

Indexing
- Experimental Biology and Medicine
- CODEN: EXBMAA
- ISSN: 0071-3384
- LCCN: sn84008267
- OCLC no.: 01568632
- Issues in Biomedicine
- ISSN: 1010-8408

Experimental Biology and Medicine was a peer-reviewed academic journal of biology and medicine published by Karger Publishers from 1967 to 1987. The publication resumed as Issues in Biomedicine from 1990 to 1991, until its cessation. The journal was indexed in Index Medicus.
