= Thomas Hodgkin (historian) =

British historian, banker and Quaker minister (1831–1913)

Thomas Hodgkin FBA
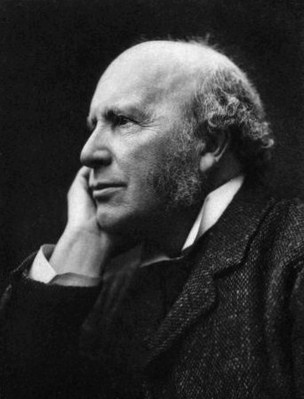
- Born: 29 July 1831; Tottenham, United Kingdom
- Died: 2 March 1913 (aged 81); Falmouth, United Kingdom
- Children: 7, including Robert
- Parent: John Hodgkin (father)
- Relatives: Hodgkin family

Academic background
- Education: University College London; University of Oxford

Academic work
- Institutions: University College London; Durham University
- Main interests: Roman Empire; Medieval philosophy
- Notable works: Italy and Her Invaders

Thomas Hodgkin, FBA (29 July 1831 – 2 March 1913) was a British historian, biographer, banker, and Quaker minister. Hodgkin's magnum opus, Italy and Her Invaders, was an eight-volume work on the history of the wars in the Late Roman Empire.

== Biography ==
Hodgkin was son of John Hodgkin, barrister and Quaker minister, and Elizabeth Howard (daughter of Luke Howard). In 1861 he married Lucy Ann (1841–1934) (daughter of Alfred Fox who created Glendurgan Garden and Sarah, born Lloyd, his wife). They had three sons and three daughters.

Having been educated as a member of the Society of Friends and taken the degree of BA at University College London and obtained the additional degrees of DCL (Oxford and Durham) and LittD (Dublin). He became a partner in the banking house of Hodgkin, Barnett, Pease and Spence, Newcastle-on-Tyne, a firm afterwards amalgamated with Lloyds Bank.

While continuing in business as a banker, Hodgkin devoted a good deal of time to historical study, and soon became a leading authority on the history of the early Middle Ages, his books. His magnum opus, Italy and Her Invaders, was published in eight volumes. He died at Falmouth on 2 March 1913. His and the Hodgkin family papers are held at the Wellcome Library in London.

== Family ==
The family of Thomas and Lucy Hodgkin is listed as:

- Lucy Violet (1869–1954), author, married John Holdsworth
- John (died in infancy)
- Edward (1872–1921) married Katie Wilson
- Elizabeth, known as Lily (born 1874) married Herbert Gresford Jones
- Ellen Sophie (1875–1965) married Robert Carr Bosanquet
- Robert Howard (24 April 1877 – 28 June 1951) married Dorothy Smith. He was Provost of The Queen's College, Oxford, author of A History of the Anglo-Saxons (1935)
- George (1880–1918) married Mary Wilson. Their son, Alan Hodgkin, received the 1963 Nobel Prize in Physiology.

Lucy Violet Hodgkin, later Holdsworth, was a writer and gave the 1919 Swarthmore Lecture under the title Silent Worship: The way of wonder. She assembled her father's letters and wrote a memorial to her brother, George, published in 1923.

Ellen Sophia, later Bosanquet, wrote an autobiography, published by her daughter Diana Hardman, as Late Harvest: Memories, letters poems.

== Publications ==
Hodgkin's chief works are:

- Italy and her Invaders (8 vols., Oxford, 1880–1899; vols. I, II, 1890, (revised 1892), vols. III, IV, 1892 (rev 1896), vols. V, VI, 1895, vols. VII, VIII, 1899); republished as The Barbarian Invasions of the Roman Empire, (8 vols., The Folio Society, 2001)
- The Dynasty of Theodosius (Oxford, 1889);
- Theodoric the Goth (London, 1891);
- An introduction to the Letters of Cassiodorus: being a condensed translation of the Variae Epistolae of Magnus Aurelius Cassiodorus, Senator (London, 1886).

He also wrote a Life of Charles the Great (London, 1897); Life of George Fox (Boston, 1896); and the opening volume of Longman's Political History of England (London, 1906).
