= John Hodgkin (tutor) =

British artist (1766–1845)

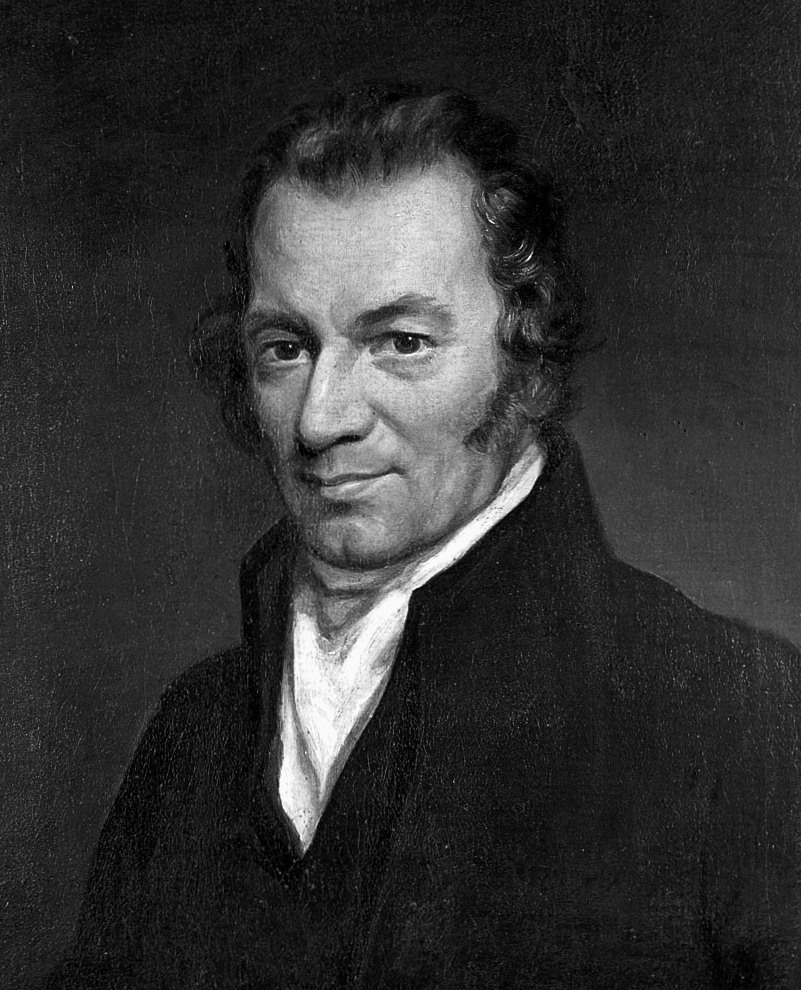
John Hodgkin in the early 1800s.

John Hodgkin (11 February 1766 – August 1845) was an English tutor, grammarian, and calligrapher.

== Life ==
He was born at Shipston-on-Stour, and was educated partly at a Quaker school at Worcester, and partly by his uncle, Thomas Hodgkin, a successful private tutor in London, who invited his nephew to follow his profession. Thomas Hodgkin accepted an offer from David Barclay of Youngsbury to become headmaster of Ackworth School in Yorkshire; and at age 15 John Hodgkin went there as assistant for a year. In 1787 he joined Thomas Young in superintending the education of Hudson Gurney, Barclay's grandson; the two were resident tutors, at Youngsbury and elsewhere. In combination they forming a successful study group and friendship. The two tutors seem to have given each other mutual instruction for four years, and tutors and pupil remained warm friends through life.

In 1792 Hodgkin spent some months at Vincennes in France. He returned to England, and soon became well known as a private tutor. His pupils were mainly ladies belonging to the families of wealthy citizens in the environs of London. These he instructed in the classics and mathematics, but especially in the art of handwriting.

Hodgkin resided for some years at Pentonville, London, and then moved to Tottenham, where he died in August 1845.

== Works ==
Hodgkin left a manuscript autobiography, covering his time in France in the aftermath of the French Revolution. When Louis XVI took the oath to the constitution, Hodgkin, as a Quaker, had a conscientious objection to raising his hand; and his plain dress caused him to be taken for an abbé. He described the consternation at Vincennes on 10 October 1792, the day of the massacre of the Swiss guard.

Hodgkin's Calligraphia Græca was written in 1794, and was engraved by his friend Harry Ashby. It was dedicated to Hodgkin's friend Young, at whose suggestion it was composed. Young furnished the gnomic sentences from various authors, which Hodgkin wrote in Greek characters. A translation by Young of King Lear's curse into Greek iambics, undertaken at the request of Edmund Burke, was also added. The work was not published till 1807, when it appeared together with Pœcilographia Græca, in which nineteen Greek alphabets of various periods are figured, and some seven hundred contractions used in Greek manuscripts are given. Some of them were brought to Hodgkin's notice by Richard Porson.

Hodgkin also published, besides school and exercise books:

- Definitions of some of the Terms made use of in Geography and Astronomy, London, 1804; 2nd edit., 1812.
- Specimens of Greek Penmanship, London, 1804.
- An Introduction to Writing, 4th edit., London, 1811.
- A Sketch of the Greek Accidence, London, 1812.

He also took part in Excerpta ex J. F. Bastii commentatione cum tabulis lithographicis a J. Hodgkin transcripta, 1835.

== Family ==
Hodgkin married in 1793 Elizabeth Rickman of Lewes, a cousin of Thomas Rickman the architect. Thomas Hodgkin (1798–1866) and John Hodgkin (1800–1875) were their sons.
