= Arthur Smith (historian) =

British historian (1850–1924)

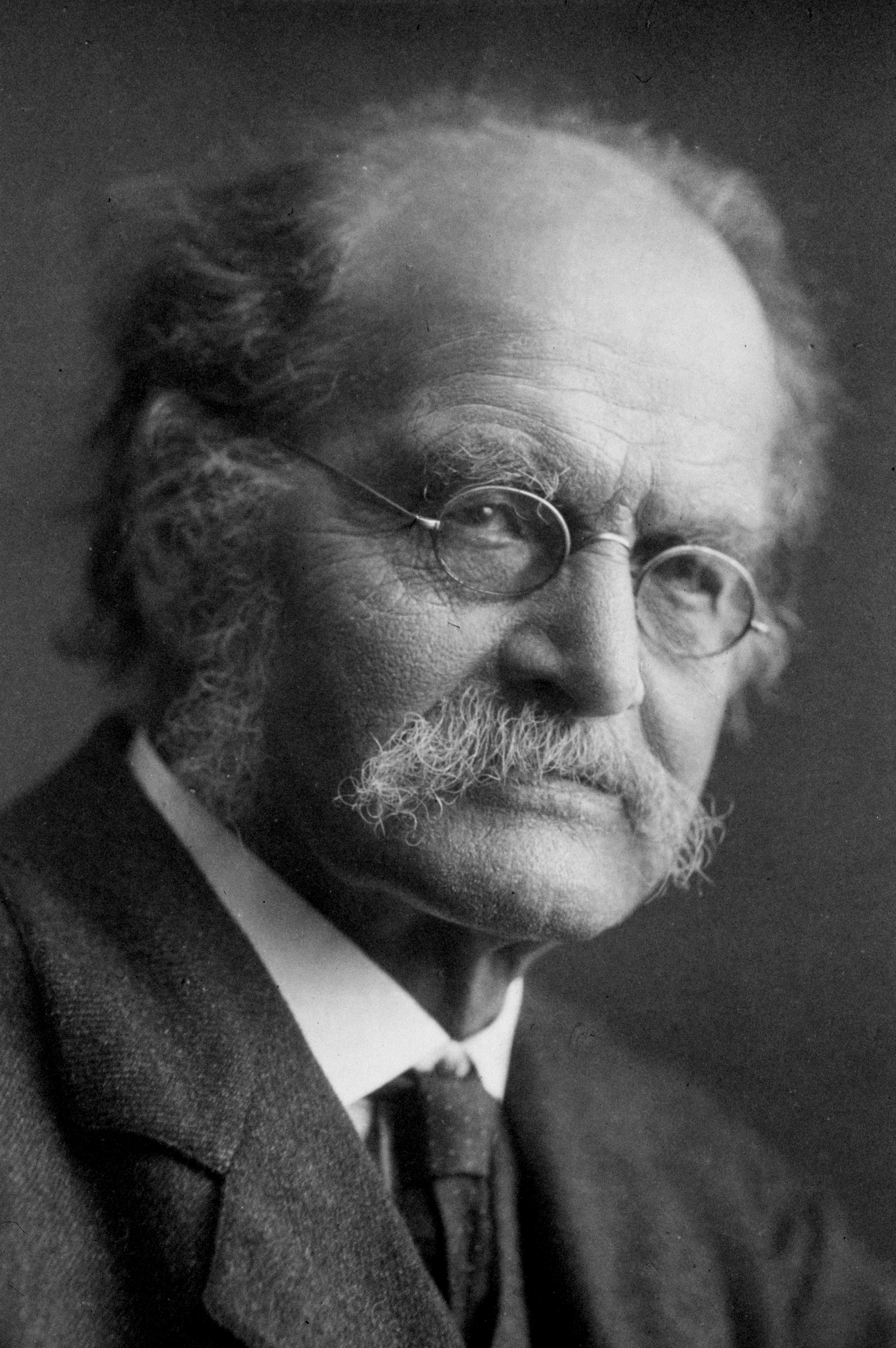
- Smith in the early 20th century

Master of Balliol College, Oxford
- In office 1916–1924
- Preceded by: James Strachan-Davidson
- Succeeded by: Sandie Lindsay

Personal details
- Born: Arthur Lionel Smith; 4 December 1850
- Died: 12 April 1924 (aged 73)
- Spouse: Mary Smith (m. 1879)
- Children: 7

Academic background
- Education: Christ's Hospital; Balliol College, Oxford

Academic work
- Discipline: Historian
- Sub-discipline: Modern history; History of England; Church and state in medieval Europe; Frederick II, Holy Roman Emperor
- Institutions: Trinity College, Oxford; Balliol College, Oxford
- Notable students: R. H. Tawney

Arthur Lionel Smith (4 December 1850 – 12 April 1924) was a British historian at the University of Oxford. Smith served as Master of Balliol College, Oxford, from 1916 to 1924.

== Early life ==
Smith was born in on 4 December 1850, the second son of the civil engineer William Henry Smith and his wife Alice Elizabeth Strutt, daughter of Jacob Strutt and his wife Elizabeth Byron. His widowed mother placed Arthur in Christ's Hospital at age six, before leaving the country. He was a student at Balliol College, Oxford from 1869 to 1874.

On graduating, Smith became a Fellow of Trinity College, Oxford. In 1876, he entered Lincoln's Inn. He was married in 1879.

== Career ==
Smith left Trinity, and began to teach at Balliol, in 1879. He became a Fellow there in 1882. He was Dean in 1907, and was Master 1916–1924.

In October 1907 Smith paid a visit to Ruskin College on behalf of a group of some of his university colleagues. He broached the idea of bringing Ruskin closer to the University, suggesting that this would involve the University providing funds for the College, and allowing Ruskin College students to join the University. Although this was warmly received by a couple of students, the bulk asked him what the University wanted in return. When he was unable to give a clear reply, the bulk of the students – drawing on their experience as trade union negotiators – became suspicious that the proposal would lead to the erosion of the college's independence. These concerns were vindicated when following a visit from Lord Curzon where the proposal was repeated and Dennis Hird, a lecturer in Sociology and Logic responded informing Curzon that as far as the students were concerned Ruskin College was irrevocably part of the Labour movement, which they envisaged making great changes in society presently. It subsequently transpired that certain members of the Ruskin College had been planning to sack Hird and to alter the curriculum by replacing Sociology and Logic with literature and temperance.

Smith was important in developing history teaching. He was a close friend of the pomologist Ronald Hatton.

== Personal life ==
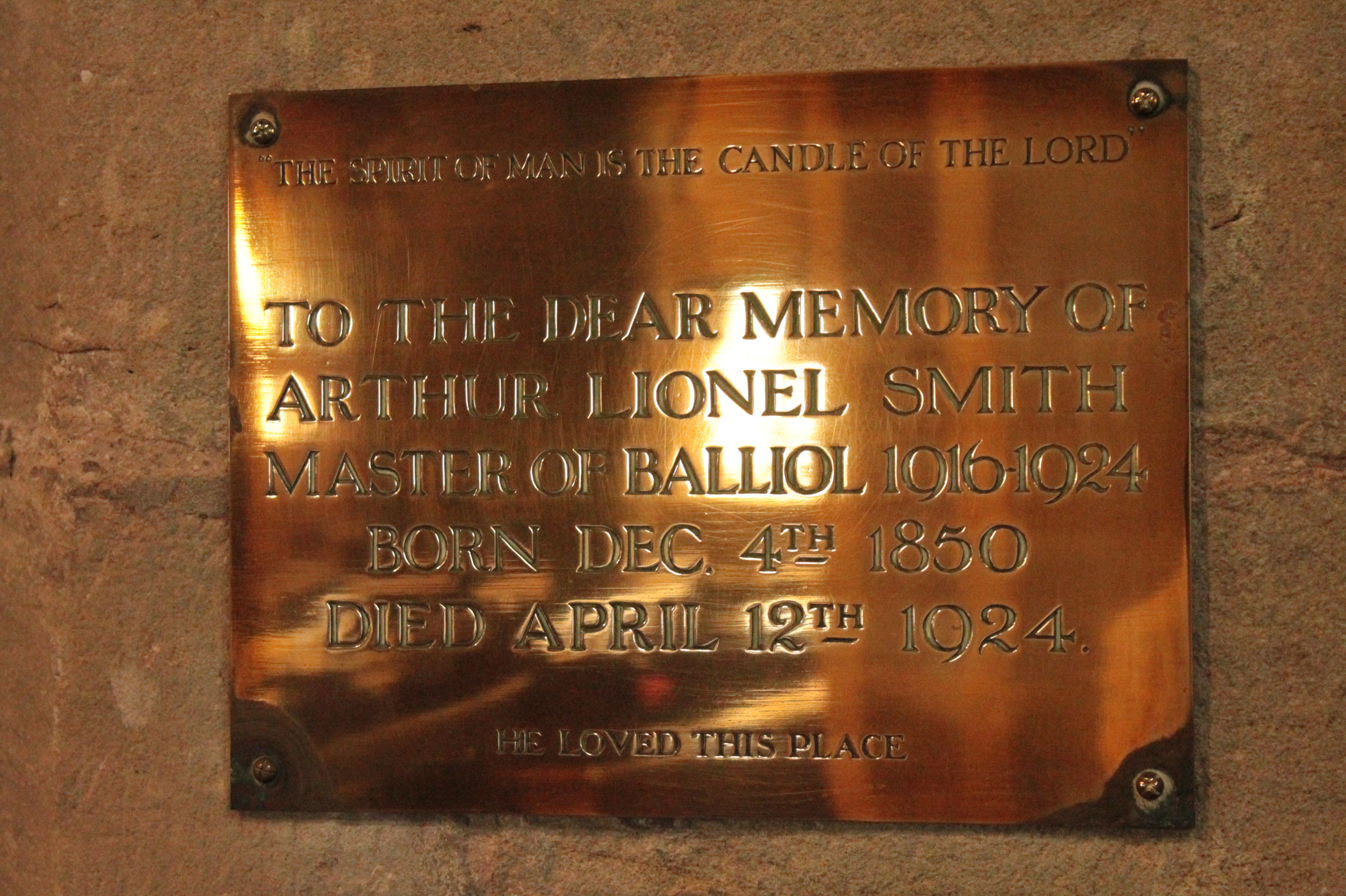
Memorial to Arthur Lionel Smith, St Aidan's Church, Bamburgh

In 1879, Smith married Mary Smith, with whom he had nine children. They first lived at 7 Crick Road in North Oxford until 1893. Their daughter Miriam married the diplomat Sir Reader Bullard. Smith's daughter Rosalind married Oxford historian Edward Murray Wrong. His youngest daughter Barbara married Sir Hugh Cairns the first Nuffield Professor of Surgery.

Academic offices
Preceded by James Leigh Strachan-Davidson	Master of Balliol College, Oxford; 1916–1924	Succeeded by Alexander Dunlop Lindsay
