= Arnaud Oihenart =

Arnaud Oihenart, also known as Arnauld de Oihenart (7 August 1592 – 14 January 1668), was a Basque lawyer, politician, historian and poet.

Oihenart was born at Mauléon, Kingdom of Navarre, France. He studied law at Bordeaux, where he took his degree in 1612. He practised first in his native town, and after his marriage to Jeanne d'Erdoy, the heiress of a noble family of Saint-Palais, Pyrénées-Atlantiques, at the bar of the Parliament of Navarre. He worked as a lawyer at the Estates of Soule, where he was elected commoner representative in 1663.

He spent his leisure and his fortune in the search for documents bearing on the old Basque and Béarnese provinces; and the fruits of his studies in the archives of Bayonne, Toulouse, Pau, Périgord and other cities were embodied in forty-five manuscript volumes, which were sent by his son Gabriel to Colbert. Twenty of these are in the Bibliothèque Nationale of Paris (Coll. Duchesne). In his quest for information, he attempted to scour the files of the Accountancy Chamber or Comptos in the Spanish Navarre, but was denied access by the viceroy to prevent his using it against the 1512 Spanish military takeover.

Oihenart published in 1625 a Déclaration historique de l'injuste usurpation et retention de la Navarre par les Espagnols and a fragment of a Latin work on the same subject is included in Auguste Galland's Mémoires pour l'histoire de Navarre (1648). His most important work is Notitia utriusque Vasconiae, tum Ibericae, tum Aquitanicae, qua praeter situm regions et alia scitu digna (1638 and 1656), a description of Gascony and Navarre. His collection of 537 Basque proverbs or adages, Atsotizac edo Refravac, included in a volume of his poems Gastroa Nevrthizetan, printed in Paris in 1657 under the French title Les Proverbes Basques Recueillis Par Le Sr D’Oihenart, Plus Les Poesies Basques du mesme Auteur, was supplemented by a second collection, Atizen Venquina. The proverbs were edited by Francisque Xavier Michel (1847), and the supplement by P. Hariston (1892) and by V. Stempf (1894).

See Julien Vinson, Essai d'une bibliographie de la langue basque (Paris, 1891); J. B. E. de Jaurgain, Arnaud d'Oihenart et sa famille (Paris, 1885).

== Descendants ==
One of his descendants, Bernardo Oyhanarte, emigrated from France and arrived in Argentina on January 5, 1854. Bernardo Oyhanarte came from the canton of Saint-Jean-Pied-de-Port, after a stopover in Montevideo, aboard the ship Progreso. Julio César Oyhanarte (1920–1997), in turn descended from Bernardo Oyhanarte, was an Argentine jurist who served as a Justice of the Supreme Court of Argentina from 1958 to 1962 and from 1989 to 1991.

== See also ==
- Joan Tartas
