= Jeanne Leschi =

French physical anthropologist

Jeanne Leschi (active 1948–1959) was a French physical anthropologist known for her work with Wolof people and Dogon people in West Africa. Leschi completed her doctorate in science from the University of Paris.

== Life ==
Leschi earned her doctorate from the University of Paris in science. She was first employed by the French National Museum of Natural History and was a researcher at the Centre National de la Recherche Scientifique. She was a member of the Society of Anthropology of Paris.

Her work included an investigation on the melanoderm and leucoderm among races, which addressed idea that each human race has a distinct endocrine equilibrium. Her study approached the subject from the angle of the corti-adrenal function of melanoderm and leucoderm races.
