= Transliterations of Manchu =

There are several systems for transliteration of the Manchu alphabet, which is used for writing the Manchu and Xibe languages. These include transliterations in Latin script and in Cyrillic script.

== Romanization ==
The romanization used in most recent western publications on Manchu is the one employed by the American sinologist Jerry Norman in his Comprehensive Manchu-English Dictionary (2013), a central reference tool in modern Manchu studies.

This system, which has become the de facto modern standard in English-language publications, is the most recent incarnation of a system originally designed by the German linguist Hans Conon von der Gabelentz for his 1864 edition of the Manchu translation of the Four Books and other Chinese classics. As he explains:

"Because Manchu possesses an alphabetic script, it was acceptable, as being without any disadvantage whatsoever, to replace the indigenous Manchu script, the use of which would have made printing much more difficult and expensive, by our alphabet. I started out from the principle of substituting a single symbol for each Manchu letter, while avoiding the addition of diacritical marks as much as possible."

With his new system, Gabelentz did away with cumbersome transliterations such as dch, tch, kh, replacing them with j, c, h. The result has been described as a "simple and convenient system".

Gabelentz also used this transliteration in his Manchu-German dictionary (1864), and the system was adopted unchanged by other German manchurists such as Erich Hauer for his dictionary (1952–55), and Erich Haenisch for his grammar (1961).

In the 19th century the system was adopted, with minor changes, by the French linguist Lucien Adam in his grammar (1873), by the Belgian linguist Charles de Harlez in his handbook (1884), and by the German diplomat and linguist Paul Georg von Möllendorff. In English-language publications, the latter is often credited with being the inventor of the system, probably because his Manchu Grammar (1892) was the first book in English to use it. Thus Norman himself refers to "the Möllendorff system of romanization". Authors writing in French and German generally recognize Gabelentz as its creator.

The system as used by Gabelentz (1864), Möllendorff (1892) and Norman (2013) is set out below, with the older system used by Gabelentz in his grammar (1832) added for comparison. Also in the table are the Pinyin-based system designed by Hu (1994) which is the standard in Chinese-language publications, and the input system of BabelPad. The table follows the traditional order of the Manchu alphabet.

Manchu script	IPA value	Gabelentz 1832	Gabelentz 1864	Möllendorff 1892	Norman 2013	Hu 1994	Babel- Pad	Abkai
ᠠ	/a/	a						
ᡝ	/ə/	e						
ᡳ	/i/	i						
ᠣ	/o/	o						
ᡠ	/u/	u						
ᡡ	/ʊ/	ô		ū		uu		v
ᠨ᠊	/n/	n						
ᡴ᠊	/qʰ/	k						
ᡤ᠊	/q/	g						
ᡥ᠊	/χ/	kh	h					
ᠪ᠊	/p/	b						
ᡦ᠊	/pʰ/	p						
ᠰ᠊	/s/, /ɕ/	s						
ᡧ᠊	/ʃ/, /ɕ/	ch	ś	š		sh	x	
ᡨ᠊	/tʰ/	t						
ᡩ᠊	/t/	d						
ᠯ᠊	/l/	l						
ᠮ᠊	/m/	m						
ᠴ᠊	/tʃʰ/, /tɕʰ/	tch	c			ch	c	q
ᠵ᠊	/tʃ/, /tɕ/	dch	j			zh	j	
ᠶ᠊	/j/	y						
ᡴᡝ᠊	/kʰ/	k						
ᡤᡝ᠊	/k/	g						
ᡥᡝ᠊	/x/	kh	h					
ᠺ᠊	/kʰ/	k’		k‘	k’	kk	kh	k‘
ᡬ᠊	/k/	g’		g‘	g’	gg	gh	g‘
ᡭ᠊	/x/	kh’	h’	h‘	h’	hh		h‘
ᡵ᠊	/r/	r						
ᡶ᠊	/f/	f						
ᠸ᠊	/w/	w						
ᡮ᠊	/tsʰ/	ts	z’	ts‘	ts	c	ts	c
ᡮᡟ	/tsʰɨ/	tse	z’e	ts		cy	tsy	cyʻ
ᡯ᠊	/ts/	ds	z	dz		z	dz	z
ᡯᡳ᠌	/tsɨ/	dse	ze	dz		z	dz	zyʻ
ᡰ᠊	/ʐ/	j	ź	ž		rr	z	rʻ
ᠰᡟ	/sɨ/	sse	s̱e	sy				syʻ
ᡱ᠊ᡳ	/tʂʰɨ/	tchhi	c'i	c‘y	cy	chy	chi	qyʻ
ᡷ᠊ᡳ	/tʂɨ/	dchhi	j'i	jy		zhy	zhi	jyʻ

The standard transliteration system follows the following conventions:

- The velar and uvular consonants are not differentiated: ⟨k⟩ and ⟨q⟩ are both transliterated as k, ⟨g⟩ and ⟨ɢ⟩ are both g, and ⟨x⟩ and ⟨χ⟩ are both h.

In Manchu orthography, the use of either the velars or the uvulars is largely predictable: velars before e, i, u and uvulars before a, o, ū. The standard transliteration leaves some ambiguity, as the spelling is not entirely predictable in syllable-final position. For example teksin "straight" can be written as ⟨teksin⟩ or as ⟨teqsin⟩.

- The spelling ⟨nk⟩ is transliterated as ng, for example ⟨inenkgi⟩ inenggi "day", ⟨cankqai⟩ cangkai "only, just", ⟨gunk⟩ gung "duke".
- The spelling ⟨ii⟩ is transliterated as i, for example ⟨baiita⟩ baita "thing", ⟨meiihe⟩ meihe "snake", ⟨duiin⟩ duin "four".

In the standard transliteration, the spellings sh and th each represent two separate consonants, as in eshen /əsxən/ "uncle", butha /butχa/ "hunting, fishing". In Hu’s transliteration, separate s and h are written as s’h (es’hen) to avoid confusion with sh (Norman š). Gabelentz (1864) used the transcriptions sḥ and tḥ, with a dot under the h (esḥen, butḥa).

== Cyrillization ==
The following cyrillization (paired in the table below with the Norman system) was designed by the Russian diplomat and linguist Ivan Zakharov and used in his important Manchu dictionary (1875) and grammar (1879). He applies the following rules:

- The velar and uvular consonants are not differentiated: ⟨k⟩ and ⟨q⟩ are both transliterated as к, ⟨g⟩ and ⟨ɢ⟩ are both г, and ⟨x⟩ and ⟨χ⟩ are both х.
- The velars are marked with a macron (к̄, г̄, х̄) when followed by а (a), о (o) and у (u); к̄ ⟨k⟩ is also used for the velar when it occurs in syllable-final position.
- The spelling ⟨nk⟩ is transliterated as н before velars and uvulars, for example ⟨inenkgi⟩ инэнги "day", ⟨cankqai⟩ чанкай "only, just"; before other consonants, and in word-final position, ⟨nk⟩ is transliterated as нъ, for example ⟨sinknambi⟩ синънамби /siŋnambi/ "to listen", ⟨gunk⟩ гунъ /ɡuŋ/ "duke".
- The back vowel [ʊ] is transliterated у after the uvulars, and ӯ after other consonants (see Table below).
- Syllable-final consonants are written with the hard sign (бъ, мъ, etc.), with the exception of нь (n) which is written with the soft sign because нъ stands for /ŋ/.
- The spelling ⟨-ii-⟩ is transliterated as й, for example ⟨baiita⟩ байта "thing", ⟨meiihe⟩ мэйхэ "snake", ⟨duiin⟩ дуйнь "four".
- The ⟨-i-⟩ is not transliterated in the spellings ⟨-iya-⟩, ⟨-iye-⟩, ⟨-iyo-⟩, and ⟨-iyū-⟩.
- Combinations of ⟨y⟩ plus vowel are transliterated with the Cyrillic iotated vowel letters я (ya), ѣ (ye), іō (yo), ю (yu), and ю̄ (yū).

	а	э	и	о	у	ӯ		
	a	e	i	o	u	ū		
н-	на	нэ	ни	но	ну	нӯ	-нь	
n-	na	ne	ni	no	nu	nū	-n	
-нг-	нга	нгэ	нги	нго	нг̄у	нгу	-нъ	
-ngg-	-ngga	-ngge	-nggi	-nggo	-nggu	nggū	-ng	
-нк-	нка	нкэ	нки	нко	нк̄у	нку		
-ngk-	ngka	-ngke	-ngki	ngko	-ngku	ngkū		
к-	к̄а	кэ	ки	к̄о	к̄у		-к̄(ъ)	
k- ⟨k-⟩	k’a	ke	ki	k’o	ku		-k	
к-	ка			ко		ку	-к(ъ)	
k- ⟨q-⟩	ka			ko		kū	-k	
г-	г̄а	гэ	ги	г̄о	г̄у			
g- ⟨g-⟩	k’a	ke	ki	g’o	ku			
г-	га			го		гу		
g- ⟨ɢ-⟩	ga			go		gū		
х-	х̄а	хэ	хи	х̄о	х̄у			
h- ⟨x-⟩	h’a	he	hi	h’o	hu			
х-	ха			хо		ху		
h- ⟨χ-⟩	ha			ho		hū		
б-	ба	бэ	би	бо	бу	бӯ	-бъ	
b-	ba	be	bi	bo	bu	bū	-b	
п-	па	пэ	пи	по	пу	пӯ		
p-	pa	pe	pi	po	pu	pū		
с-	са	сэ	си	со	су	сӯ	-съ	
s-	sa	se	si	so	su	sū	-s	
			cы					
			sy					Pinyin si
ш-	ша	шэ	ши	шо	шу	шӯ		
š-	ša	še	ši	šo	šu	šū		
т-	та	тэ	ти	то	ту	тӯ	-тъ	
t-	ta	te	ti	to	tu	tū	-t	
д-	да	дэ	ди	до	ду	дӯ		
d-	da	de	di	do	du	dū		
л-	ла	лэ	ли	ло	лу	лӯ	-лъ	
l-	la	le	li	lo	lu	lū	-l	
м-	ма	мэ	ми	мо	му	мӯ	-мъ	
m-	ma	me	mi	mo	mu	mū	-m	
ч-	ча	чэ	ци	чо	чу	чӯ		
c-	ca	ce	ci	co	cu	cū		
			чи					
			cy					Pinyin chi
чж-	чжа	чжэ	цзи	чжо	чжу	чжӯ		
j-	ja	je	ji	jo	ju	jū		
			чжи					
			jy					Pinyin zhi
	я	ѣ		іō	ю	ю̅	-й	
y-	(i)ya	(i)ye		(i)yo	yu	(i)yū	-i	
р-	ра	рэ	ри	ро	ру	рӯ	-ръ	
r-	ra	re	ri	ro	ru	rū	-r	
ф-	фа	фэ	фи	фо	фу	фӯ		
f-	fa	fe	fi	fo	fu	fū		
в-	ва	вэ						
w-	wa	we						
ц-	ца	цэ		цо	цу	цӯ		
ts-	tsa	tse		tso	tsu	tsū		
			цы					
			ts					Pinyin ci
цз-	цза	цзэ		цзо	цзу	цзӯ		
dz-	dza	dze		dzo	dzu	dzū		
			цзы					
			dz					Pinyin zi
ж-	жа	жэ	жи	жо	жу	жӯ		
ž-	ža	že	ži	žo	žu	žū		

== Sources ==
- Adam, Lucien (1873). Grammaire de la langue mandchou. Paris: Maisonneuve.
- Gabelentz, Hans Colon de la (1832). Elémens [sic] de la grammaire mandchoue. Altenbourg: Comptoir de la Littérature.
- Gabelentz, Hans Colon von der (1864). Sse-schu, Schu-king, Schi-king in Mandschuischer Uebersetzung mit einem Mandschu-Deutschem Wörterbuch. Abhandlungen für die Kunde des Morgenlandes, Vol. III, part 1 (Text). Leipzig: Deutsche Morgenländische Gezellschaft.
- Gabelentz, Hans Colon von der (1864). Sse-schu, Schu-king, Schi-king in Mandschuischer Uebersetzung, mit einem Mandschu-Deutschen Wörterbuch. Abhandlungen für die Kunde des Morgenlandes, Vol. III, part 2 (Wörterbuch). Leipzig: Deutsche Morgenländische Gesellschaft.
- Haenisch, Erich (1961). Mandschu-Grammatik mit Lesestücken und 23 Texttafeln. Leipzig: VEB Verlag Enzyklopädie.
- Harlez, Charles de (1884). Manuel de la langue mandchoue. Grammaire, anthologie & lexique. Paris: Maisonneuve.
- Hauer, Erich (1952–1955). Handwörterbuch der Mandschusprache. Tokyo, Hamburg: Gesellschaft für Natur- und Völkerkunde Ostasiens. ISBN 978-3-447-05528-4.
- Hu Zhenyi, ed. (1994). Xin Man Han da cidian / Iche Manzhu Nikan gisun kamchibuha buleku bithe [New Comprehensive Manchu-Chinese Dictionary]. Ürümqi: Xinjiang renmin chubanshe. ISBN 7-228-02404-4.
- Ligeti, L. (1952). "À propos de l'écriture mandchoue" (PDF). Acta Orientalia Academiae Scientiarum Hungaricae. II: 235–301.
- Möllendorff, Paul Georg von (1892). A Manchu Grammar, with Analyzed Texts. Shanghai: American Presbyterian Mission Press.
- Norman, Jerry (2013). A Comprehensive Manchu-English Dictionary. Harvard-Yenching Institute Monograph Series, 85. Cambridge (Mass.), London: Harvard University Press. ISBN 978-0-674-07213-8.
- Roth Li, Gertraude (2010). Manchu: A Textbook for Reading Documents. Second Edition. University of Hawai‘i at Mānoa: National Foreign Language Resource Center. ISBN 978-0-9800459-5-6.
- Захаров, Иван Ильич (1875). Полный Маньчжурско-Русскій Словарь [Comprehensive Manchu-Russian Dictionary] (PDF). Санктпетербургъ: Типографія Императорской Академіи Наукъ.
- Захаров, Иван Ильич (1879). Грамматика Маньчжурскаго Языка [Grammar of the Manchu Language]. Санктпетербургъ: Типографія Императорской Академіи Наукъ.
