= Julio Oyhanarte =

Argentine immigration lawyer

- Citizenship: Argentine
- Education: Universidad Austral; UCLA School of Law; King's College London
- Occupation: Lawyer
- Known for: Immigration TV
- Relatives: Julio César Oyhanarte (grandfather)

Julio Oyhanarte is an Argentine lawyer specializing in United States immigration law. He is a grandson of Julio César Oyhanarte, who served two terms as a justice of the Supreme Court of Argentina during the mid and late 20th century. Julio Oyhanarte is a co-founder of the law firms DGO Legal and DGOPC Law, and also created Immigration TV, known as Inmigración TV on its Spanish-language channels.

== Early life and education ==
Julio Oyhanarte's paternal ancestor was the French Basque jurist and poet Arnaud Oihenart (1592–1667), and his great-granduncle was the lawyer, politician, and diplomat Horacio Oyhanarte (1885–1946). One of his ancestors, Bernardo Oyhanarte, emigrated from France and arrived in Argentina on 5 January 1854 aboard the ship Progreso, having set out from the canton of Saint-Jean-Pied-de-Port and stopped over in Montevideo. His grandfather was the jurist Julio César Oyhanarte (1920–1997), a Justice of the Supreme Court of Argentina from 1958 to 1962 and from 1989 to 1991.

Oyhanarte earned his law degree from Universidad Austral in Argentina and later completed a Master of Laws (LL.M.) at the University of California, Los Angeles School of Law. In 2017, he was selected as a Chevening Scholar to pursue a master's degree in public policy at King's College London.

== Career ==
Before moving to the United States, Oyhanarte practiced law in Argentina. From 2010 to 2014, he served as a legal secretary at Argentina's Council of the Magistracy.

Oyhanarte was admitted to the State Bar of California in 2019. In the United States, he practices at DGO Legal and DGOPC Law, firms he co-founded. Oyhanarte primarily specializes in immigration law pertaining to Latin American immigrants in the United States.

In 2024, he participated in MIT delta v, operated by the Martin Trust Center for MIT Entrepreneurship.

Oyhanarte and Immigration TV received multiple Shorty Awards distinctions, and four Webby Award nominations between 2025 and 2026. He also received the Martín Fierro Award in the Latinos por el Mundo category for Inmigración TV in November 2025.
