= Honoré Chavée =

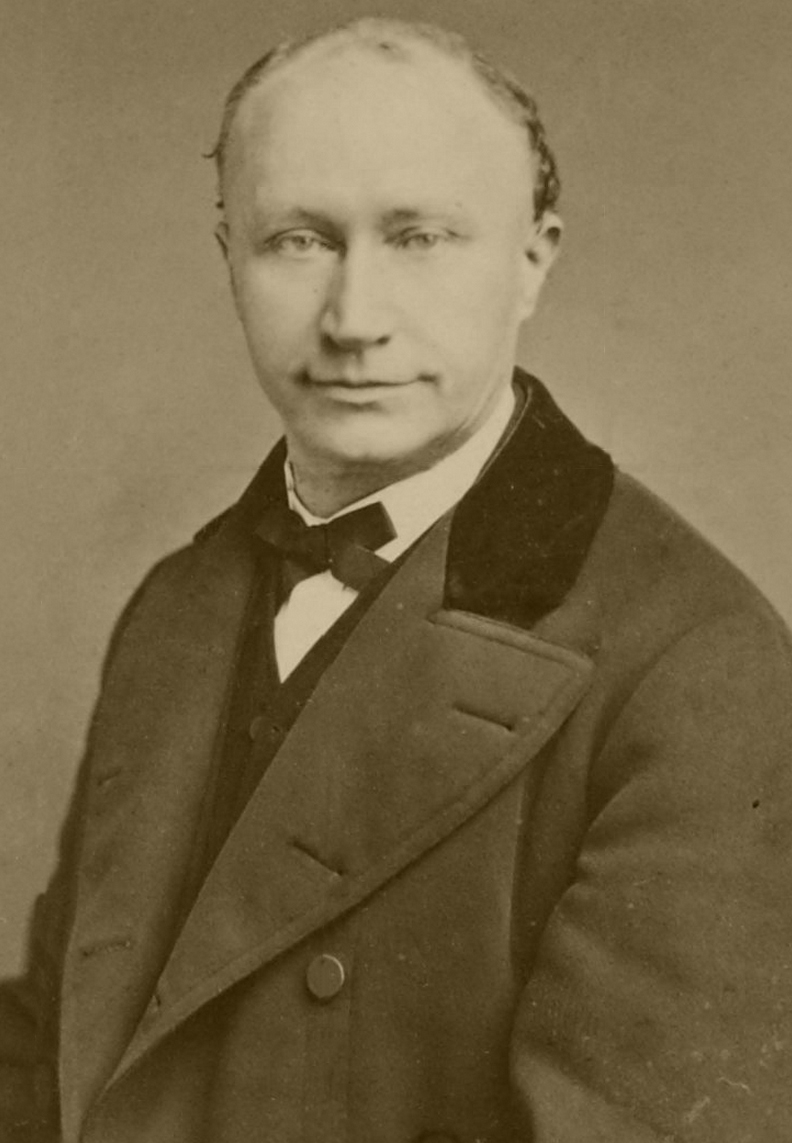
Honoré Chavée

Honoré Chavée (1815–1877) was a Belgian Indo-Europeanist and Semitologist who started natural linguistics in France. He also founded the Revue de Linguistique et de Philologie Comparée — the first French journal devoted to linguistics — in 1867 with his student Abel Hovelacque.

Chavée first trained as a priest at Namur Diocesan Seminary before eventually leaving the faith (becoming a Freemason) and moving to Paris to teach at Collège Stanislas de Paris from 1846 to 1848. He was mostly a self-taught philologist influenced by Franz Bopp, Friedrich Christian Diez, and Frédéric Eichhoff although he did study Semitic languages under the instruction of Jan Theodoor Beelen. He gave guest lectures in Bologna and Pisa.

Chavée considered language to be a living organism. His comparative research included word meanings, and he attempted to reduce them to elementary semantic atoms. Most of historical reconstructions are speculative. He also contributed linguistic descriptions of Walloon language, his native tongue, and worked on language education.
