= Taensa language =

Falsified indigenous language of North America

Taensa
- Native to: United States
- Region: northeastern Louisiana
- Ethnicity: Taensa
- Extinct: late 19th century
- Language family: Natchez: Taensa

Language codes
- ISO 639-3: –
- Glottolog: None
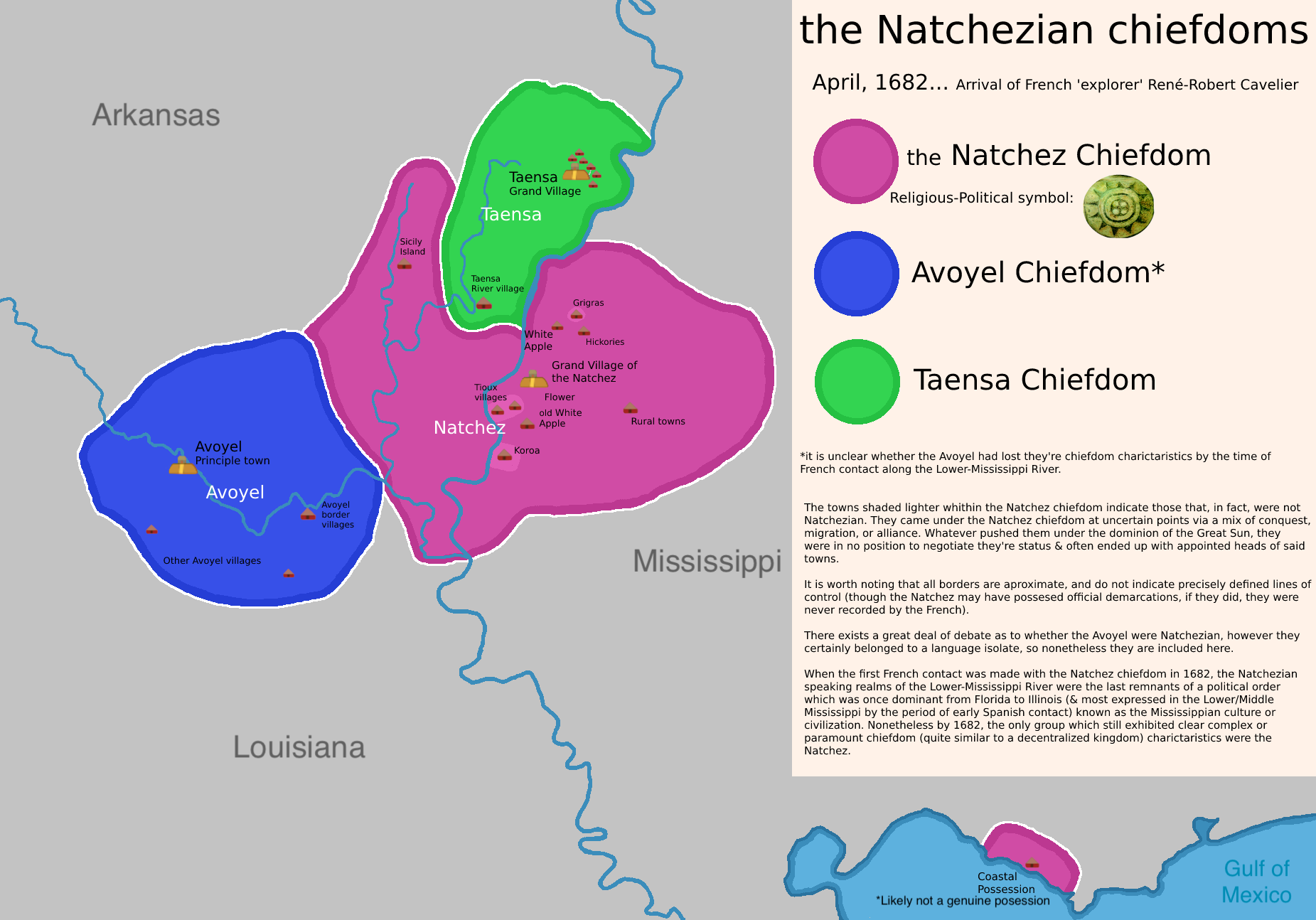
- Taensa

The Taensa language was spoken by the Taensa people originally of northeastern Louisiana, and later with historical importance in Alabama. Though poorly documented, it was probably a dialect of the Natchez language. It was also the subject of controversy beginning in 1880–1882, when a French student published a grammar and sample texts of a language that he claimed to be Taensa, though it bore no resemblance to Natchez — these publications are generally considered to be a hoax and the language it described to be invented.

The earliest European reports of the language were from French missionary priests who said that they learned Natchez in order to speak to the Taensa people; Mooney's summary of the people and missionary efforts describes the Taensa language as a variant of the Natchez.

A clerical student named Jean Parisot published purported "material of the Taensa language, including papers, songs, a grammar and vocabulary" in Paris in 1880–1882, reports which led to considerable interest on the part of philologists and linguists of the time. Several eminent scholars accepted the materials as genuine, but by 1885, Daniel Garrison Brinton and Julien Vinson had begun arguing that the work was fraudulent. After much debate, the consensus of the field came to be that the work was a hoax.

== Background of actual people and language ==
The Native Americans originally of northeastern Louisiana known as the Taensa were related to, but had separated themselves from the peoples of the Natchez nation, following a series of conflicts with them and others—e.g., the Taensa had been subject to slave raids by the Chickasaw, Yazoo, and Natchez. By the time of the Natchez Massacre under the governor of French Louisiana, Bienville, the Taensa had moved from Louisiana to Alabama. Also referred to as the Tensas, Tensaw, and grands Taensas (in French), and by many other near variants (see the article on the Taensa people), the people so named were village-dwelling Native Americans originally from lands near present-day Tensas Parish, Louisiana. Relocating several times in response to inter-tribal hostilities, the Taensa ultimately migrated, ca. 1740, under French protection to lands along the current Tensas river near Mobile, Alabama, only to return to the Red River in Louisiana after land cessions by the French to the English in 1763, then moving southward to Bayou Boeuf and Grand Lake before their disappearance as a community.

While French missionary priests François de Montigny and Jean-François Buisson de Saint-Cosme stated that the Taensa spoke Natchez, a language that both missionaries were learning, others, such as Mooney describe the Taensa language as a variant of the Natchez.

The Taensa spoken by these people was a form of the Natchez, a language isolate that may be related to the Muskogean languages. Over time small differences in pronunciation emerged, but the two languages appear, based on the available data, and from this historical vantage point, to have been largely the same. Beginning in the early nineteenth century, the Taensa people became intermixed with other groups, particularly the Chitimacha. Their language survived into the second half of the nineteenth century, and people identifying as Taensa have been documented from the 1930s through to the present day.

== The fraudulent invention ==
Taensa
- Created by: Jean Parisot
- Date: 1882
- Purpose: Constructed language: fraud; Taensa

Language codes
- ISO 639-3: None (mis)
- Glottolog: (insufficiently attested or not a distinct language) taen1234

=== Document ===
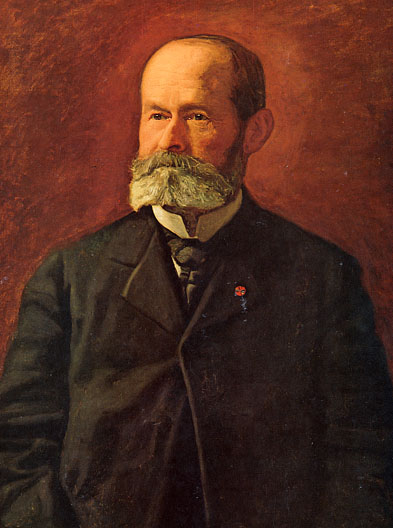
Daniel Garrison Brinton, initially positive, later argued the grammar was a hoax.

In the 1880s, Jean Parisot, a nineteen-year-old student at a seminary in Plombières, France, published a grammar and other material of what he claimed to be the hitherto undocumented language of the Taensa people of Louisiana. He claimed the material was based on an undated and anonymous manuscript in Spanish that he had found in the library of his maternal grandfather (surnamed Haumonté). Parisot published a short notice on the language in La Revue de linguistique et philologie comparée in 1880. Lucien Adam, an older linguist who had worked on North American languages, encouraged Parisot to publish the full material and contributed commentaries to the resulting book. The Grammaire et vocabulaire de la langue Taensa, avec textes traduits et commentés par J.-D. Haumonté, Parisot, L. Adam was published in 1882 in Paris and caused a stir among linguists.

The material included an outline of the grammar, vocabulary and fragments of text in the Taensa language. When the material was published, two eminent French Americanists, Lucien Adam and Julien Vinson, supported the work.

=== Controversy ===
The linguist Albert Samuel Gatschet defended the work at first. Gatschet stated that the language was unrelated to any other. In 1885 he started studies in Indiana, and thereafter became silent on the subject. The ethnologist Daniel Garrison Brinton also had an initially positive reaction, quoting a complete song from the grammar in an 1883 work on native American literature and praising the songs as "Ossianic in style." Later Brinton reversed his position and declared that the material was fake, publishing his reasons in 1885. Vinson also came to believe it was a hoax. Adam continued to defend the work for a while, but in 1885 he and Brinton co-authored Le Taensa a-t-il été forgé de toutes pièces, which discussed whether the entire work was a forgery. In 1908 and 1910, John R. Swanton concluded it was a hoax, based on primarily historical rather than linguistic grounds, presenting evidence that the Taensa people spoke either the Natchez language or a close variant of it. Franz Boas's Introduction to the Handbook of American Indian Languages concluded there were enough "internal evidences of the fraudulent character" of the material that "it will be far safer to reject both the vocabulary and grammar".

The fraud could have been the work of the unknown individual who created the manuscript Parisot claimed to find, or it could have been the work of Parisot, although Adam and Parisot jointly stated that the documents had not been Parisot's work when the scandal broke in 1885. Parisot later spent time in Turkey and in 1898 and 1902 published further works on linguistics based on his experience there.

In 2018, Yale linguistics professor Claire Bowern challenged Brinton and Swanton's conclusion, arguing that the available evidence does not conclusively point to a hoax.

== See also ==
- Taensa
- Natchez language
- Natchez people
- Julien Vinson

== References cited ==
- Adam, Lucien; Brinton, Daniel Garrison (1885). Le Taensa a-t-il été forgé de toutes pièces. Maisonneuve.
- Adam, Lucien; Parisot, Jean (1885). Dom Parisot ne produira pas le manuscrit Taensa. Lettre, etc.
- Brinton, Daniel Garrison (1885). The Taensa Grammar and Dictionary: A Deception Exposed. Grand Rapids, MI: Fleming H. Revell. Limited view, no internal content provided.
- Bendix, Regina (2009-07-30). In Search of Authenticity: The Formation of Folklore Studies. Univ of Wisconsin Press. ISBN 978-0-299-15543-8.
- Boas, Franz (1911). Introduction to Handbook of American Indian languages. U of Nebraska Press. ISBN 978-0-8032-5017-8.
- Campbell, Lyle (1997). American Indian Languages. Oxford University Press. ISBN 978-0-19-534983-2.
- Kniffen, Fred Bowerman; Gregory, Hiram F. (1994-09-01). The Historic Indian Tribes of Louisiana: From 1542 to the Present. LSU Press. ISBN 978-0-8071-1963-1.
- Mooney, James (1912). "Taensa Indians". In Knight, K. (ed.). The Catholic Encyclopedia. Vol. 14. New York, NY: Robert Appleton Co. Via NewAdvent.org.
- Sturtevant, William C. (2005). "History of Research on the Native Languages of the Southeast". Native Languages Of The Southeastern United States. U of Nebraska Press. ISBN 978-0-8032-4235-7.
