= Auray =

Commune in Brittany, France

Auray An Alre (Breton)
- Commune
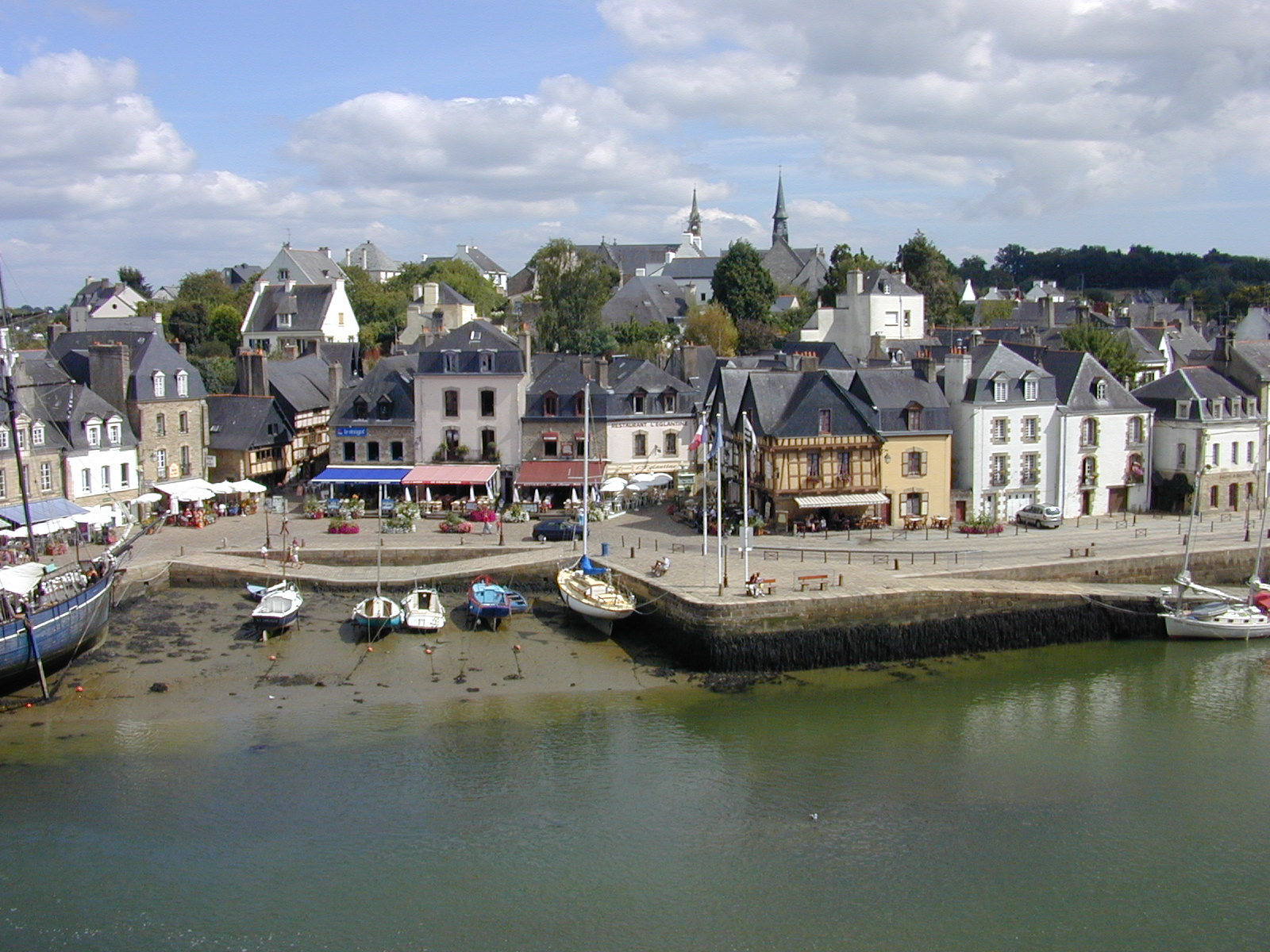

- Coat of arms
- Location of Auray
- Location within France Location within Brittany
- Coordinates: 47°40′07″N 2°58′53″W
- Country: France
- Region: Brittany
- Department: Morbihan
- Arrondissement: Lorient
- Canton: Auray
- Intercommunality: Auray Quiberon Terre Atlantique

Government
  - Mayor (2026–32): Françoise Nael
- Area^{1}: 6.91 km^{2} (2.67 sq mi)
- Elevation: 37 m (121 ft)
- Highest elevation: 43 m (141 ft)
- Lowest elevation: 0 m (0 ft)
- Population (2023): 14,207
  - Density: 2,060/km^{2} (5,330/sq mi)
- Time zone: UTC+01:00 (CET)
  - Summer (DST): UTC+02:00 (CEST)
- INSEE/Postal code: 56007 /56400
- ^{1} French Land Register data, which excludes lakes, ponds, glaciers > 1 km^{2} (0.386 sq mi or 247 acres) and river estuaries.

Auray (French pronunciation: [ɔʁɛ]; Breton: An Alre, [ãn alˈreː] or simply Alre) is a commune in the Morbihan department, administrative region of Brittany, northwestern France.

Inhabitants of Auray are called Alréens (French) and Alreiz (Breton).

== Geography ==
The city is surrounded by the communes of Crac'h to the south and the west, Brech to the north and Pluneret to the east. It is crossed by the Loch, a small coastal river, which flows into the Gulf of Morbihan. The town is high on the west bank of the river Auray on the edge of the Armorican plateau which is cut deeply by the river. The port of Saint-Goustan is also in the valley, east of the river.

== History ==
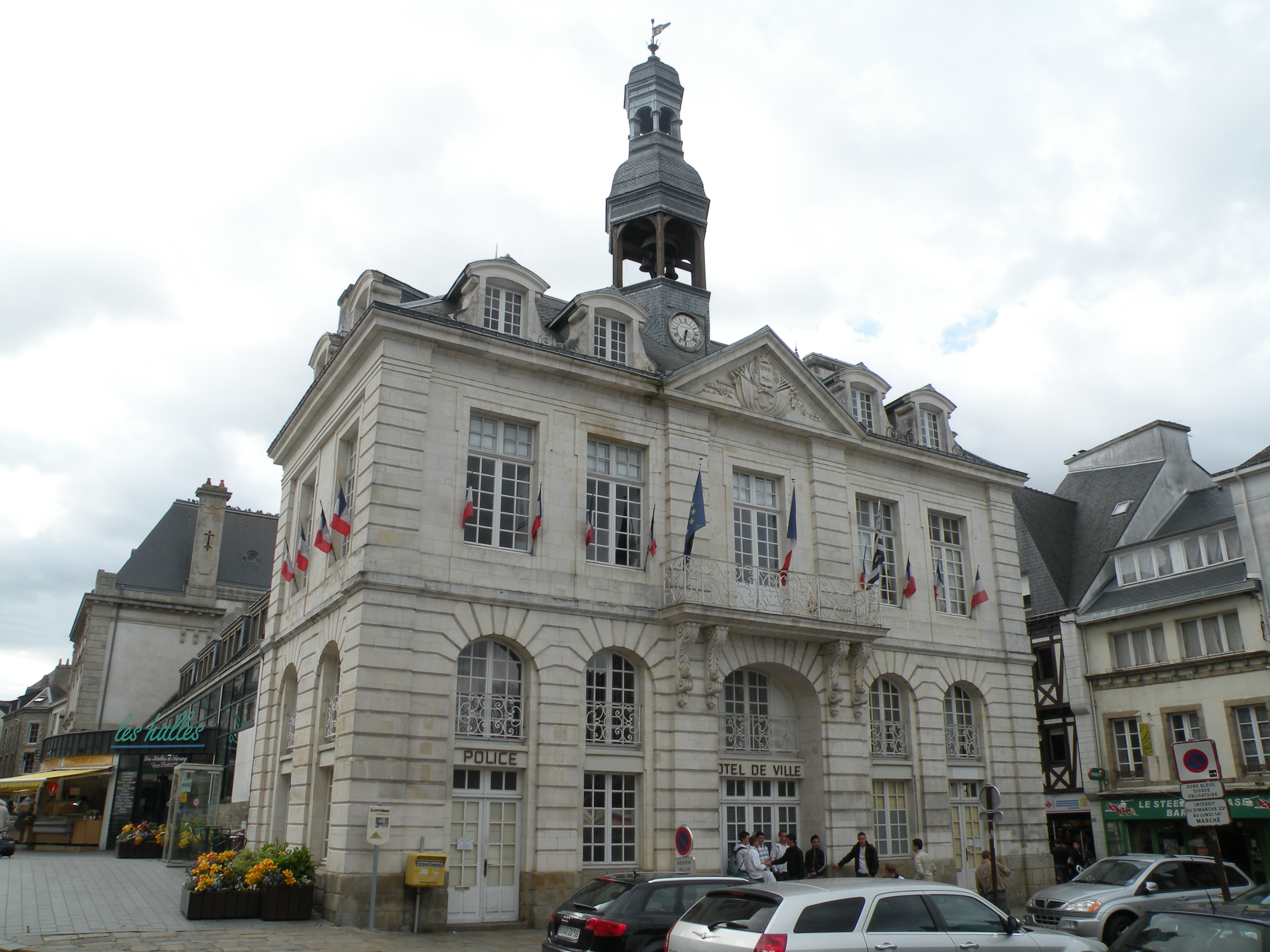
The town hall

The Battle of Auray on 29 September 1364 was the last battle of the Breton War of Succession. Kerblois, the place in Brech at which the defeated Charles de Blois was killed is marked by a crucifix.

In 1632, sailors departed from the port of Saint-Goustan to re-capture the town of Port Royal in Acadia on behalf of Cardinal Richelieu.

Benjamin Franklin arrived at the port of Saint-Goustan on 3 December 1776 at the beginning of the US War of Independence to seek military aid from Louis XVI.

In 1795, after the failure of the Quiberon Expedition, part of the royalist Chouannerie rebellion, and the surrender of the Armée des émigrés ordered by Sombreuil on 21 July, most prisoners were transferred to Auray. After a summary trial by a military commission made up of citizens of the town, 750 people were shot and buried in a meadow in Brech on the western shore of the Loch, now called the Champ des martyrs (French: Martyrs' field). In 1829, their bones were exhumed and deposited in the vault of a memorial chapel at the Auray monastery.

The railway station was strategically important during the Second World War. Concrete used to build bunkers on the region's beaches travelled through the station. After the war, the collection of military scrap material led to the creation of business in Pi-park.

== Heraldry ==

Auray's historic coat of arms: A shield of or and azure lozenges.

Auray's modern coat of arms: A field of gules, a stoat running with a floating scarf of ermine. A charge of azure with three fleur-de-lis of or.

== Population ==
Historical population
Year	Pop.	±% p.a.
1968	8,449	—
1975	10,256	+2.81%
1982	9,892	−0.51%
1990	10,323	+0.53%
1999	10,911	+0.62%
2007	12,435	+1.65%
2012	12,771	+0.53%
2017	13,627	+1.31%
2023	14,207	+0.70%
Source: INSEE

== Language ==
Historically, the people of Auray have spoken the Vannes dialect of Breton but the citizens spoke French from the eighteenth century onwards. Breton was used for preaching in Auray parishes until the 1930s. In September 2008, 3.27% of children enrolled in primary schools in the town were bilingual.

== Transport ==
=== Port ===
The port of Saint-Goustan is the site of the original town. It is located on the River Auray at the highest tidal reach of the river that ships can access. It was open to ships until the nineteenth century and was also a trading port which was particularly active in its routes with Spain and Britain. The decline of trade in the port began with the arrival of the railway in 1862 and today it is a marina and port of call on tours of the Gulf of Morbihan.

=== Roads ===
Saint-Goustan, located in the lower town, was the first point at which the river could be bridged on the coastal road between Vannes and Quimper. Downstream, the River Auray is wide and steep. Upstream, the marshes of the Loch valley makes passage difficult to Tréauray which is 4 km to the north. The Roman road from Lyon to Gésocribate (Le Conquet) via Nantes, passes the commune.

In the mid-19th century, the construction of a new road on an embankment on the marshes of Loch allowed direct access to the town from Vannes. In 1950, the Vannes-Lorient route nationale bypassed the centre of Auray to the north. In 1989, the four-carriageway Kerplouz viaduct was built on the RN165 over the Auray river downstream from St. Goustan. This rid the town of transit traffic, and created an industrial area south of the city centre.

=== Railways ===
Auray railway station is located on the Savenay - Landerneau line and marks the end of the Auray - Quiberon line. The station was inaugurated at the opening of the Rennes - Redon and the Savenay - Landerneau lines on 26 September 1862.

On 18 December 1864, a rail link to Pontivy was opened. The building of the Pontivy - Saint-Brieuc section in 1872 completed a route that crosses Brittany from the south to the north. The Pontivy - Auray section was closed to passenger traffic on 2 October 1949 but is still used for transporting goods.

On 24 July 1882, the Auray-Quiberon line was opened. Known as the Tire-bouchon (French: Corkscrew), it currently runs only in the summer.

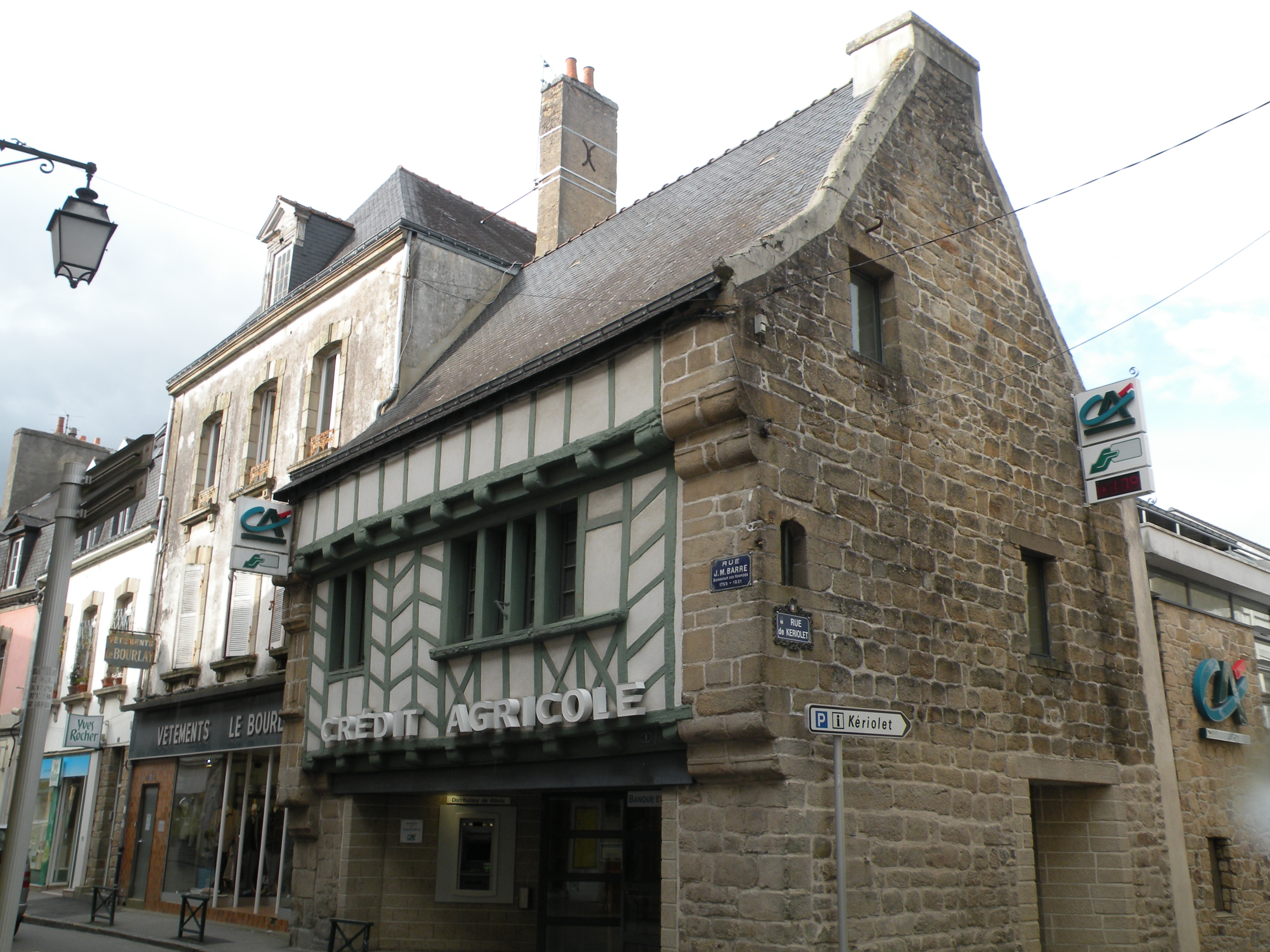
Timbered house in the town centre

Auray station is located more than 2 km north of the town centre because of the problem of building a viaduct crossing the Loch Valley. A new area was developed in the late 19th century along the road from Brech which has a junction with the Lorient road at the northern exit of the town next to the station. In particular, the Saint-Goustan port trading companies created premises there. The establishment of a train depot and a maintenance workshop for locomotives in the early 20th century attracted a greater workforce.

Today, the station is served by the Paris - Rennes - Quimper TGV and Brittany TER. In the summer, the station experiences a significant increase in activity. It is one of the boarding points for the car-train service and the Auray - Quiberon line has been reopened to passenger traffic. The freight business is very small, like everywhere else in Morbihan.

== Sights ==
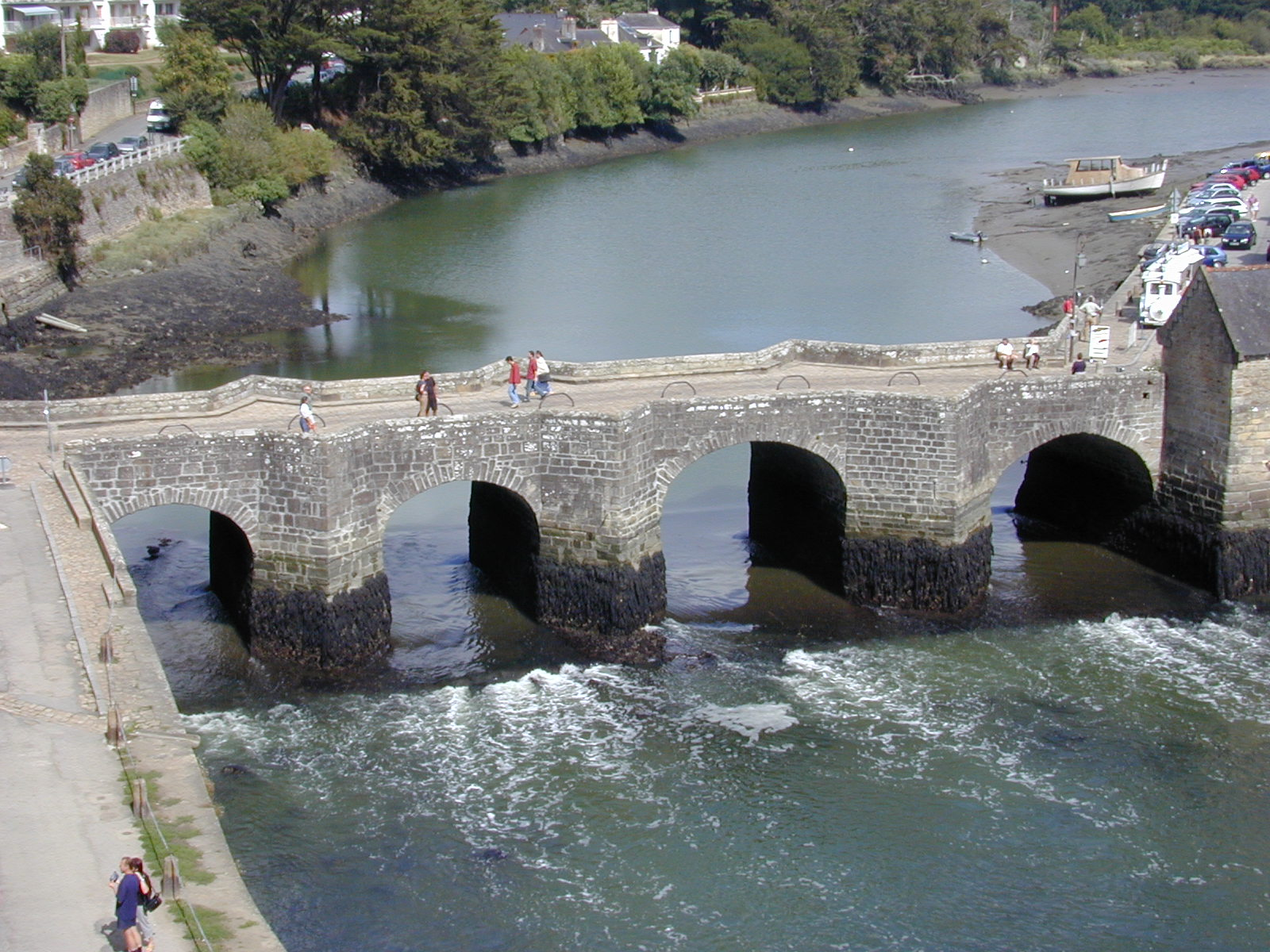
The Pont-Neuf bridge

- The port of Saint-Goustan.
- The church of St Gildas. Built in 1636 and classified as a historic monument, it contains an altar-piece from Laval and a 19th-century organ.
- The Chapel of the Holy Spirit. Built in the thirteenth century, it is the last remnant of the headquarters of the Montpellier Ordre du Saint-Esprit. In the fourteenth century, this Maison Magistrale Conventuelle et Hospitalière du Saint-Esprit à Auray, referred to in 1289 by Jean Monette, would become one of the major houses in France and, under his authority, one of some fifty foundations. In 1762, Pope Clement XIII abolished the Ordre du Saint-Esprit. Auray installed the headquarters of a general hospital on the site and later, in 1790, a military hospital. In the early 19th century, what remains of the buildings was converted into a barracks. Restoration work took place from 1990-1994 which returned the chapel to its earlier form and it has taken the name of Caserne Dugesclin. The restoration has allowed the building to regain its original form: a unique space of five spans and a shape uncommon to Brittany. The building was classed as a historical monument on 4 November 1982.
- The Town Hall, built in the 18th century has been a historical monument since 1963.
- The church of Saint-Sauveur. Built in the 19th century (its door dates to the sixteenth century), it contains a model battleship armory dating from 1865.

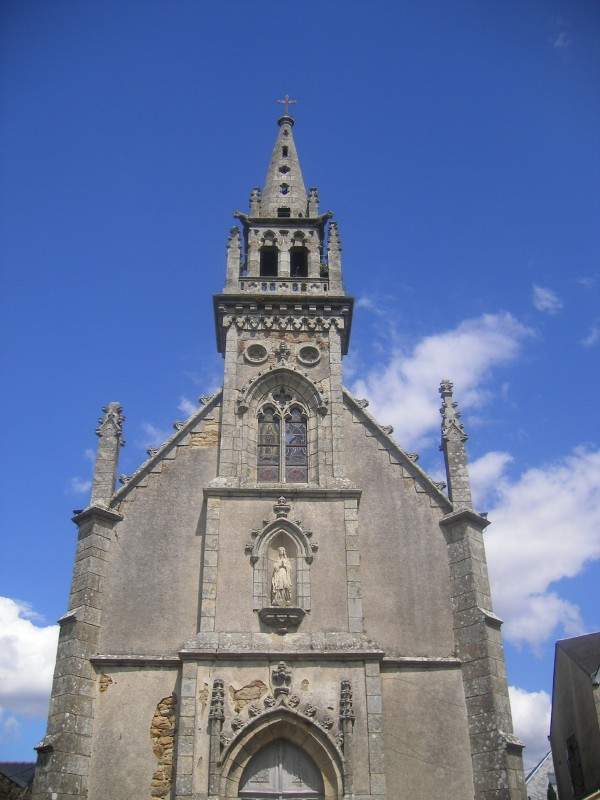
The Chapel of Notre-Dame-de-Lourdes

- The Chapel of Notre-Dame-de-Lourdes (1862–1878).
- The Saint-Goustan bridge. The first mention of a stone bridge linking the lower town to the upper is from the thirteenth century. In 1464, after its rebuilding, it was renamed Pont Neuf. Its final form dates to 1752 and its last restoration was in 1983. A toll-house building is on the right-hand-side.
- The Chazelles fountain. Located on the Martin dock, it dates from 1821 and was used to supply water to people and passing boats.
- The Auray monastery, north of the Auray railway station, is in Brech.

== Personalities ==
- Roland Becker, a traditional Breton musician, was born in Auray.
- Alain Lanty, pianist, composer and performer, was born in Auray.
- Georges Cadoudal, head of the Chouan during the French Revolution, was born in Kerléano which is today in Auray, but which was in the Brech parish at the time of his birth.
- Philippe Gildas, TV presenter, was born in Auray.
- Auguste Le Guennant (1881–1972), composer and organist, was born in Auray
- Ulrich Le Pen, a footballer, was born in Auray.
- Charles Letourneau (1831–1902), an anthropologist, was born in Auray
- Marcel Mettenhoven, the landscape painter, was born and died in Auray.
- Ballerat Georges, (1902–2000), a landscape painter, died in Auray.
- General Auguste Lahoulle (1891-1959) was born in Auray.
- Norman Doray, DJ and record producer, was born in Auray.
- Thibault Tricole, Darts player, was born in Auray.

== International relations ==
Auray is twinned with:

- Ussel, Corrèze, France
- Utting, Germany

== Sport ==
Since 1985, the city has hosted the Open Super 12 during French winter vacations, an international tennis tournament. Some well-known players have taken part, including Amélie Mauresmo, Olivier Rochus, Justine Henin-Hardenne, Kim Clijsters, Rafael Nadal, Paul-Henri Mathieu, Richard Gasquet, Dinara Safina and Alizé Cornet.

Auray received the start of the second stage of the Tour de France 6 July 2008.

== See also ==
- Communes of the Morbihan department
