= Adolphe Bloch =

French biological and racialist anthropologist

Adolphe Bloch (1882–1969) was a 20th-century French biological and racialist anthropologist as well as a Turkologist, and member of the Society of Anthropology of Paris.

He was particularly interested in the Osmanlis.

== Bibliography ==
- 1898: Les invasions barbares. Une généalogie de l'histoire de l'art
- Bloch, Adolphe (19 July 1900). "Galien anthropologiste" (PDF). Bulletins de la Société d'anthropologie de Paris. V (in French). 1: 347–359. doi:10.3406/bmsap.1900.5930. Archived from the original (PDF) on 2015-09-24.
- Bloch, Adolphe (3 July 1902). "De la race qui précéda les Sémites en Chaldée et en Susiane". Bulletins de la Société d'anthropologie de Paris. V (in French). 3: 666–682. doi:10.3406/bmsap.1902.6078.
- Bloch, Adolphe (1908). "Origine du nom de russe". Compte rendu de la treizième session - Monaco 1906. Congrès international d'anthropologie et d'archéologie préhistoriques (in French). Vol. II. Monaco: Inprimerie de Monaco. pp. 323–331.
- Bloch, Adolphe (15 May 1913). "À propos d'un enfant né avec une queue". Bulletins de la Société d'anthropologie de Paris. VI (in French). 4 (3–4): 369–372.
- Bloch, Adolphe (1 April 1915). "La calvitie au point de vue physiologique et anthropologique". Bulletins de la Société d'anthropologie de Paris. VI (in French). 6 (2): 106–115.
- Bloch, Adolphe (1 July 1915). "De l'origine des Turcs et en particulier des Osmanlis". Bulletins et Mémoires de la Société d'anthropologie de Paris. VI (in French). 6 (3): 158–168. doi:10.3406/bmsap.1915.8733.
