= Pierre Huard =

French physician and anthropologist

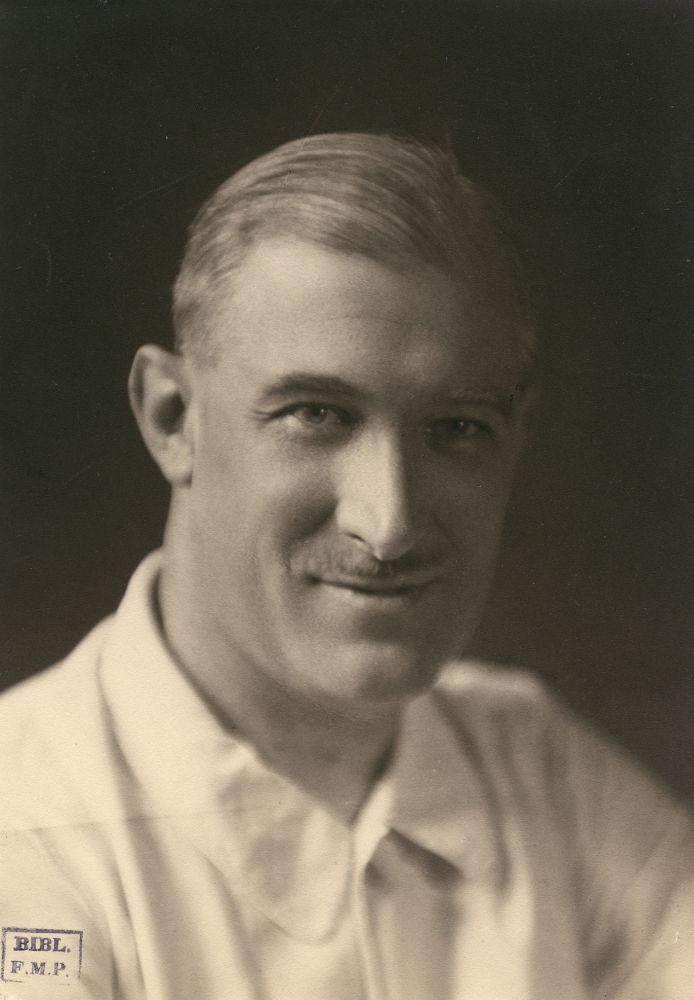
- Born: Pierre Alphonse Huard; 16 October 1901; Bastia
- Died: 28 April 1983 (aged 81); Paris
- Occupations: Physician; Anthropologist

Pierre Huard (16 October 1901 – 28 April 1983) was a French physician (surgeon and anatomist), historian of medicine and anthropologist, long in post in Indochina, dean of several faculties of medicine (Hanoï, Paris), rector of the Université Félix Houphouët-Boigny, a pioneer in the history of medicine.

== Biography ==
Born in Bastia, where his father was the director of customs (a native of Lorraine), Pierre Huard studied at the École de santé navale (Brest and Bordeaux) before being posted to Syria, then in French Indochina. He returned to France in 1936 to pass the agrégation de médecine (anatomy section), but immediately returned to the hospital and medical school of Hanoi. After the Second World War, he was appointed Dean of the Hanoi Medical University. During the First Indochina War, he was a delegate of the French High Command and the Red Cross after the Battle of Diên Biên Phu (1954) for the repatriation of wounded French soldiers. In 1957, he became medical officer of the troupes de marine, appointed professor at the Faculty of Medicine of Rennes (1955–1963) then at that of Paris (1967-1973). From 1964 to 1966, he was Rector of the University of Abidjan, then study director at the École pratique des hautes études (1966-1973). From 1970 to 1979, he was director (dean) of the Unité de formation et de recherche biomédicale des Saints-Pères of the Paris Descartes University.

Pierre Huard was the founder of the "European Center for the History of Medicine" at the Université Louis-Pasteur of Strasbourg and the "Institute of the History of Medicine and Pharmacy" at the René Descartes University (1977). He was president of the "Société française d'histoire de la médecine". He also was a member of the Society of Anthropology of Paris

In 1967, he was awarded the Prix Broquette-Gonin for his book Mille ans de chirurgie (Ve–XVe).

== Bibliography ==
=== Works by Pierre Huard ===
The publications of Pierre Huard, in addition to those of a purely medical nature (surgery and tropical medicine), mainly concern the history of medicine, surgery and life sciences, the history of science in Vietnam, Japanese and traditional Chinese medicine (with Ming Wong and Zensetsou Ohya), The history of anatomy and surgery (with Mirko Grmek). He published about thirty books and nearly 1000 articles.

List of works devoted to Asian medicine here

=== Articles on Pierre Huard ===
- Pierre Huard (1901–1983). In: Revue d'histoire des sciences. 1983, volume 36 n° 3–4. p. 332-334
