= Julien Vinson =

French linguist (1843-1926)

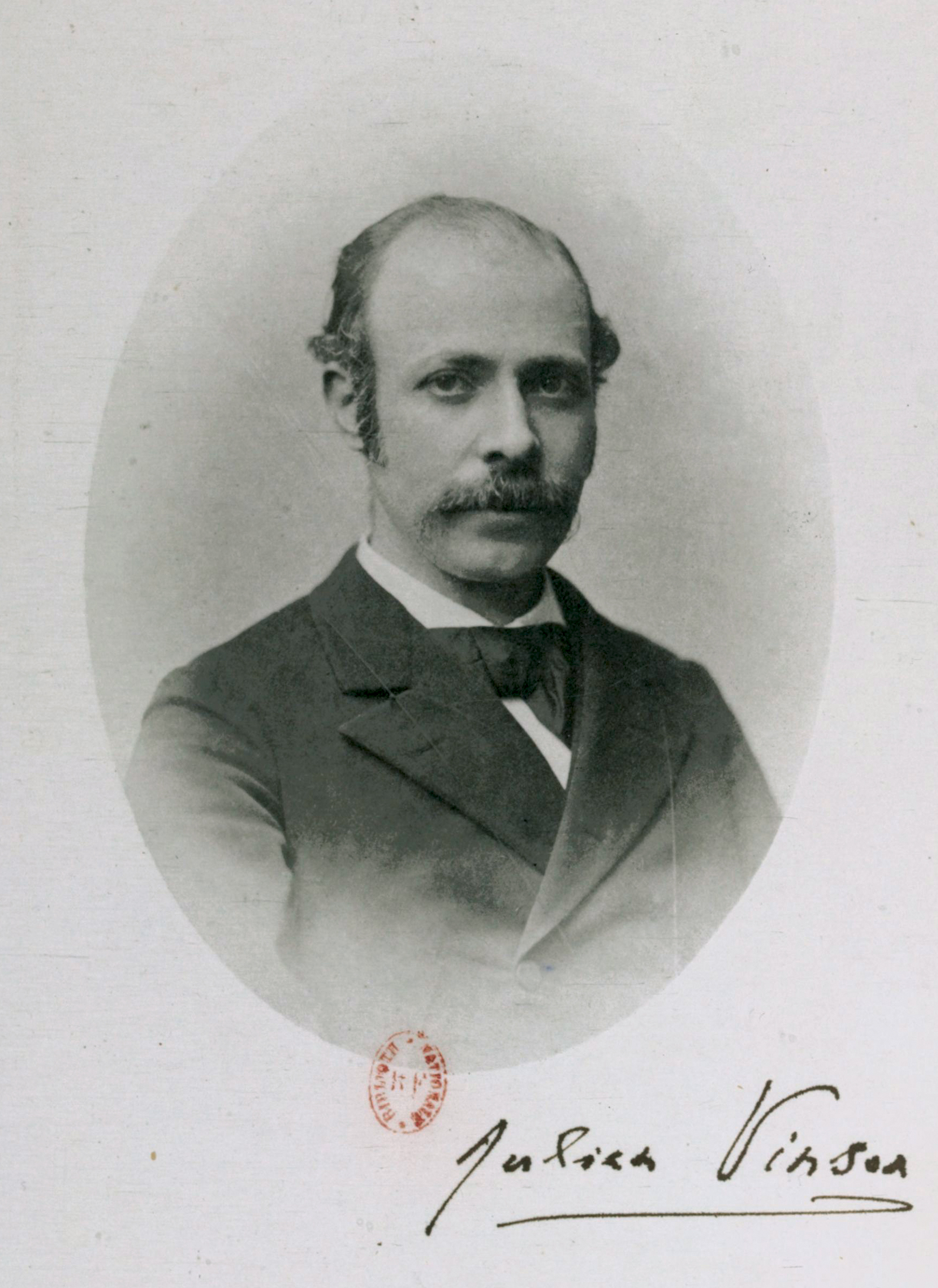
- Born: 21 January 1843; Pondicherry, India
- Died: 21 November 1926 (aged 83)
- Occupation: Linguist
- Known for: Tamil Grammar

Julien Vinson (21 January 1843 – 21 November 1926) was a French linguist who specialized in the languages of India, mainly Tamil, and also in the Basque language.

== Early years ==
Julien Vinson was born in 1843 to a French family living in Pondicherry, India. He learned the languages of the country at a very young age. Vinson first studied at the Forestry School at Nancy, and was appointed Deputy Inspector of Forests and then Inspector of Waters and Forestry. As an amateur he devoted all his free time to linguistics. He contributed to the Revue orientale (Eastern Review), then to the Revue de linguistique et de philologie comparée (Journal of Linguistics and Comparative Philology). He belonged to the naturalist school of linguistics, at that time opposed to the proponents of the school of historical comparative linguistics represented by Michel Bréal and Gaston Paris.

== Linguist ==
From 1873, the editor Abel Hovelacque hired Vinson and Émile Picot as co-editors of the journal. In 1874 Hovelacque gave way as Director to Julien Girard Rialle. In 1880, Picot retired. Girard de Rialle and Vinson shared the direction of the magazine. Finally, in 1882, Vinson became solely responsible for the magazine until it closed down in 1916. Julien Vinson undertook most of his work on the Basque language and Indian languages (Hindustani, Tamil), without neglecting other areas such as the American languages.

In 1891, Vinson wrote a letter to U.V.Swaminatha Iyer, the Tamil scholar and researcher who led the collection and publication of classical Tamil texts, after having read the recently published Cīvaka Cintāmaṇi. They exchanged several further correspondences with Vinson expressing his wish to see more of classical works to light. Swaminatha Iyer mentions that this motivated him even further in his quest to bring out more classical Tamil works. In 1903 he would be the first to create a Tamil language grammar in French drawing extensive examples from Tamil texts. In 1879, he was responsible for teaching Hindustani and Tamil at the School of Living Oriental Languages. There he was professor from 1882 until his death in 1926.

In 1882 the Grammaire et vocabulaire de la langue Taensa, avec textes traduits et commentés par J.-D. Haumonté, Parisot, L. Adam was published in Paris and caused a stir among linguists. It claimed to describe the Taensa language, the hitherto undocumented language of a people of Louisiana. When the material was published, Vinson and Lucien Adam both supported the work. Later, Vinson and other linguists came to believe it was a hoax.

== Bibliography ==
- Quelques pages inédites du père Constant-Joseph Beschi (de la Compagnie de Jésus)(s.n., 1889) [microform] :
- L'Inde française et les études indiennes de 1882 à 1884 (Maisonneuve frères et Ch. Leclerc, 1885)
- Manuel de la langue tamoule (Asian Educational Services, 1986)
- La langue taensa (1886)
- Manuel de la langue hindoustani (urdǔ et hindî) (J. Maisonneuve, 1899. Rééd. Asian Educational Services, 1987)
- La poésie chez les races du sud de l'Inde (Maisonneuve, 1871)
- Les religions actuelles (Adrien Delahaye et Emile Lecrosnier, 1888)
- Manuel de la langue tamoule (grammaire, textes, vocabulaire) (Imprimerie nationale, E. Leroux, éditeur, 1903)
- Éléments de la grammaire générale hindoustanie (Maisonneuve et cie, 1883)
- Le verbe dans les langues dravidiennes (Maisonneuve et Cie, 1878)
- Essai d'une bibliographie de la langue basque (J. Maisonneuve, 1891. Rééd. Maisonneuve & Larose, 1967)
- Bibliographie de la langue basque (Seminario de Filología Vasca "Julio de Urquijo" de la Excelentísima Diputación Foral de Guipúzcoa, 1984)
- Les Basques et le pays basque, mœurs, langage et histoire (L. Cerf, 1882; rééd. C. Lacour, 1993)
- Le Folk-lore du Pays Basque (Maisonneuve, 1883)
- Légendes bouddhistes et Djaïnas, traduites du tamoul par Julien Vinson, 1900
- Essai d'une bibliographie de la langue basque (rééd. Anthropological Publications, 1970)
