= Charles Letourneau =

French anthropologist (1831–1902)

Charles Jean Marie Letourneau (23 September 1831, Auray – 21 February 1902, 6th arrondissement of Paris) was a 19th-century French anthropologist.

== Biography ==
In 1865 he joined the Society of Anthropology of Paris of which he was general secretary from 1887 until his death. He thus succeeded Paul Broca who served in this position until 1880.

Friedrich Engels cites Letourneau's work, particularly L'évolution du mariage et de la famille (1888), in later editions of The Origin of the Family, Private Property and the State. Engels asserts that an early stage of human society featured "complete promiscuity in sexual intercourse", contrary to the beliefs of most anthropologists of the era. He quotes Letourneau: "Among mammals there is no strict relation between the degree of intellectual development and the form of sexual life".

== Publications ==
- 1868: La Physiologie des passions
- 1877: La biologie
- 1878: Physiologie des passions
- 1879: Science et matérialisme
- 1880: La sociologie d'après l'ethnographie
- 1882: Questions de sociologie et d'ethnographie
- 1887: L'Évolution de la morale, leçons professées pendant l'hiver de 1885-1886
- 1888: L'évolution du mariage et de la famille
- 1894: L'évolution littéraire dans les diverses races humaines
- 1895: La guerre dans les diverses races humaines
- 1897: L'évolution de l'esclavage dans les diverses races humaines
- 1898: L'évolution de l'éducation dans les diverses races humaines
- 1898: L'évolution religieuse dans les diverses races humaines
- 1901: La psychologie ethnique
- 1903: La condition de la femme dans les diverses races et civilisations
