= Saint-Goustan =

Former fishing port in Auray, Brittany, France

Coordinates: 47°39′55″N 2°58′38″W

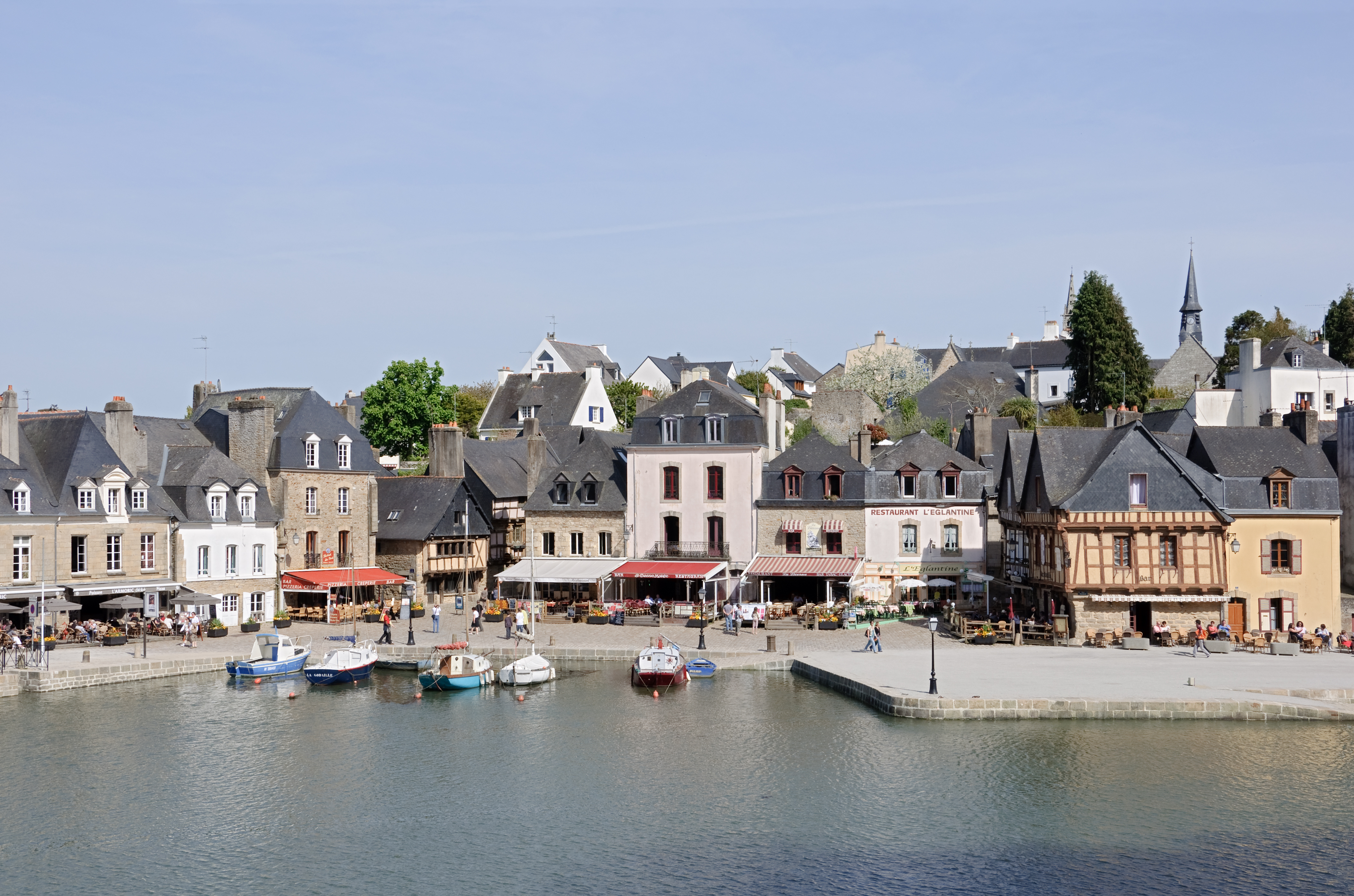
Saint Goustan

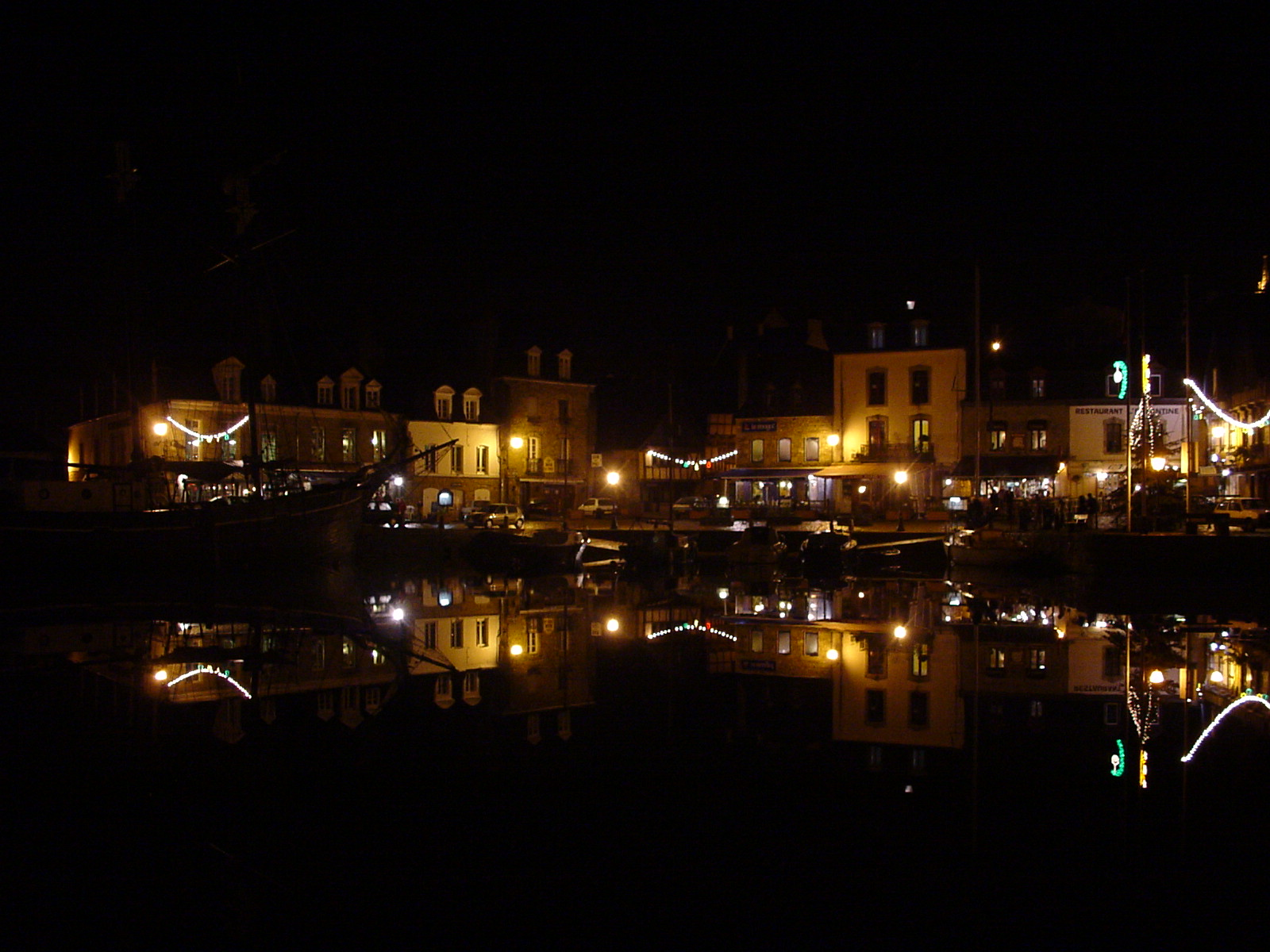
Saint Goustan at night

The French port of Saint-Goustan is a former fishing port and trading centre situated beside the river Auray (or river Loc'h.) In modern times it has become one of the quarters of the commune of Auray in the department of Morbihan in Brittany.

The port is named after Saint Goustan, the patron saint of sailors and fishermen.

== History ==
In the early 17th century, the town of Auray decided to build a port on the left bank of the Loc'h. Quays and ramps were constructed to allow for the unloading of trade ships where previously vessels had used cruder pontoon structures to dock at the side of the river.

An examination of port taxation in 1537 illustrates the commercial activity in Saint-Goustan. The city imports wine, salt, leather, iron and Biscay steel. Conversely, wheat, rye, oats, butter, meat, fish, cloth and fabric are exported. The Auray region was a surplus producer of grain at that time.

The development of the larger Auray port in 1641 was completed with the construction of a wharf and two ramps between the old pier which had been built in 1615. This work included the place Saint-Sauveur and continued south to the construction of the current Franklin dock. The stone moorings were placed in 1692.

The creation of the Lorient port (1665–1670) and the lack of major roads connecting Saint-Goustan to the hinterland were the cause of a decline in activity in the port. This further decreased with the arrival of the railway and the creation, in 1865, of a new road to Auray which isolated the port and further reduced its trade. The only activity on the Franklin wharf in the early 20th century was the transport of wooden beams for coal mines in Wales.

== Events ==
- Book and postcard fair
- Craft markets
- The Loc'h games
- The Southern Brittany Oyster Festival

== The Benjamin Franklin Wharf ==
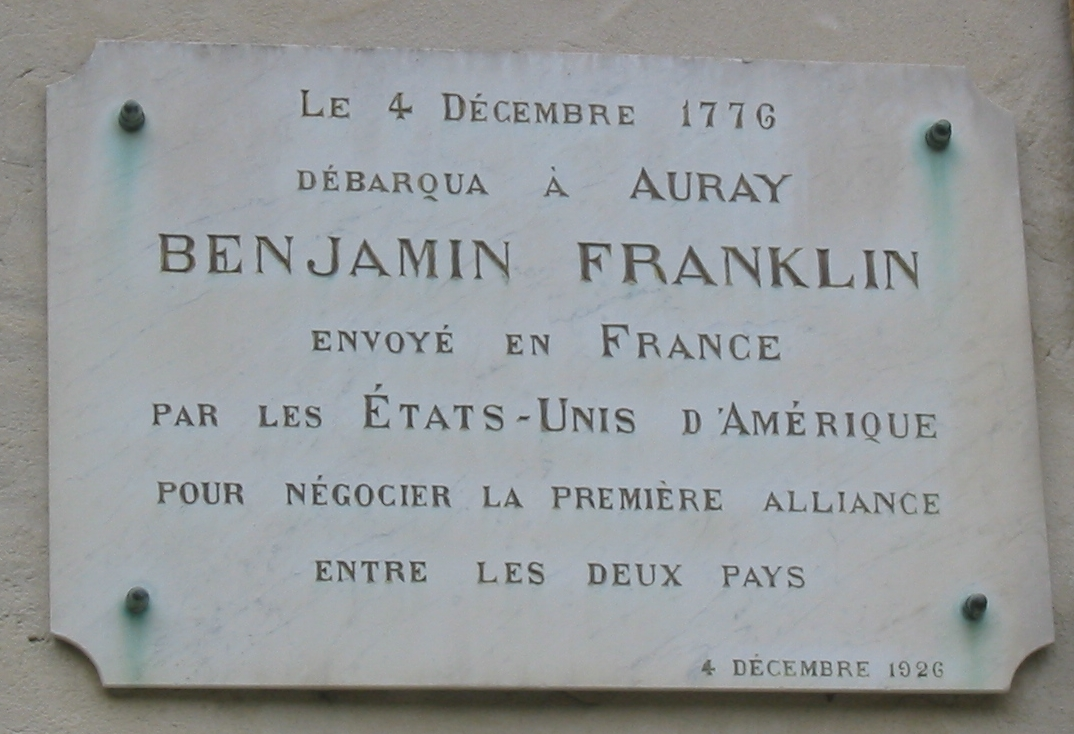
Plaque commemorating the arrival of Benjamin Franklin

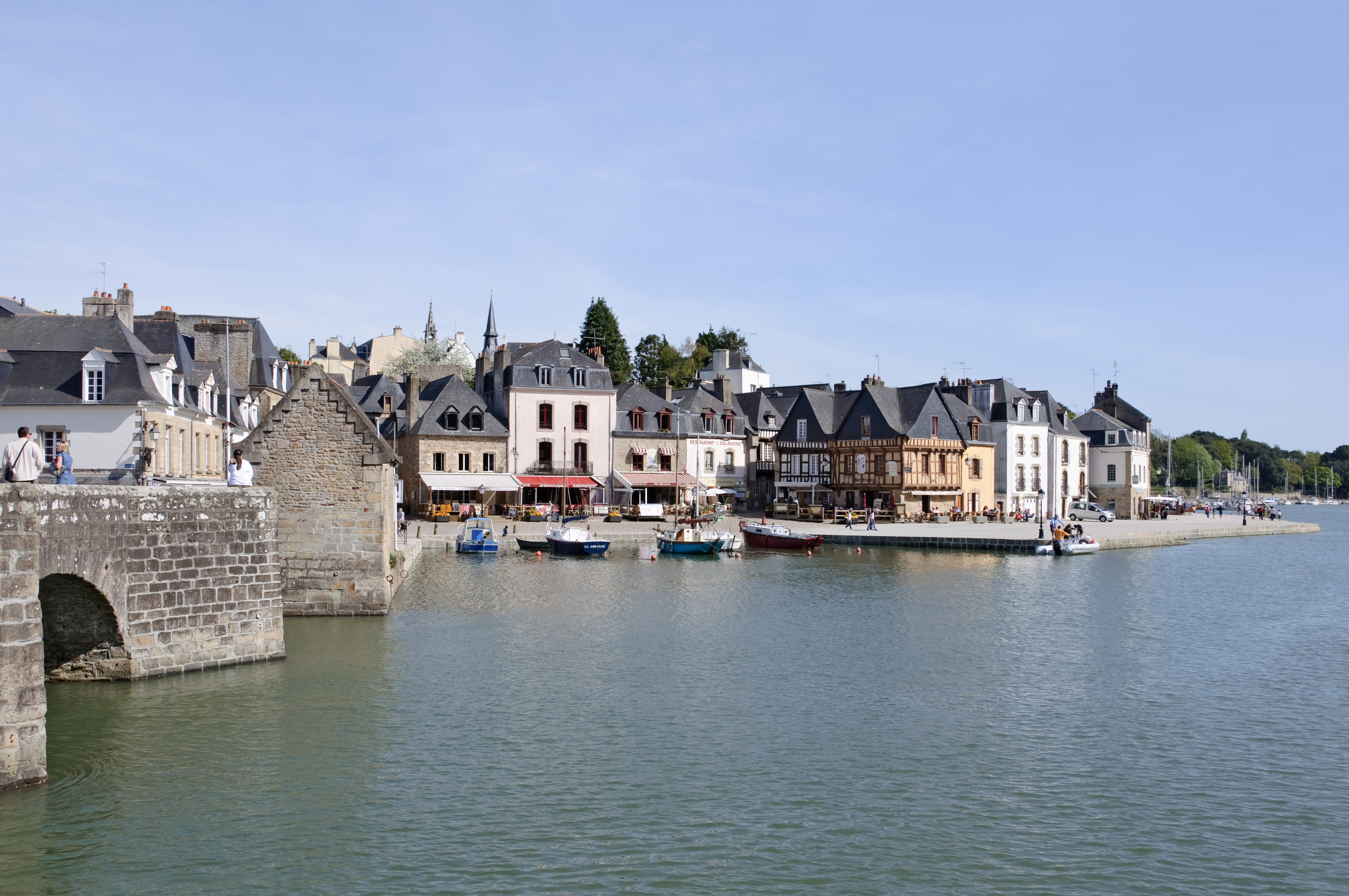
Saint Goustan port with a view on Benjamin Franklin wharf

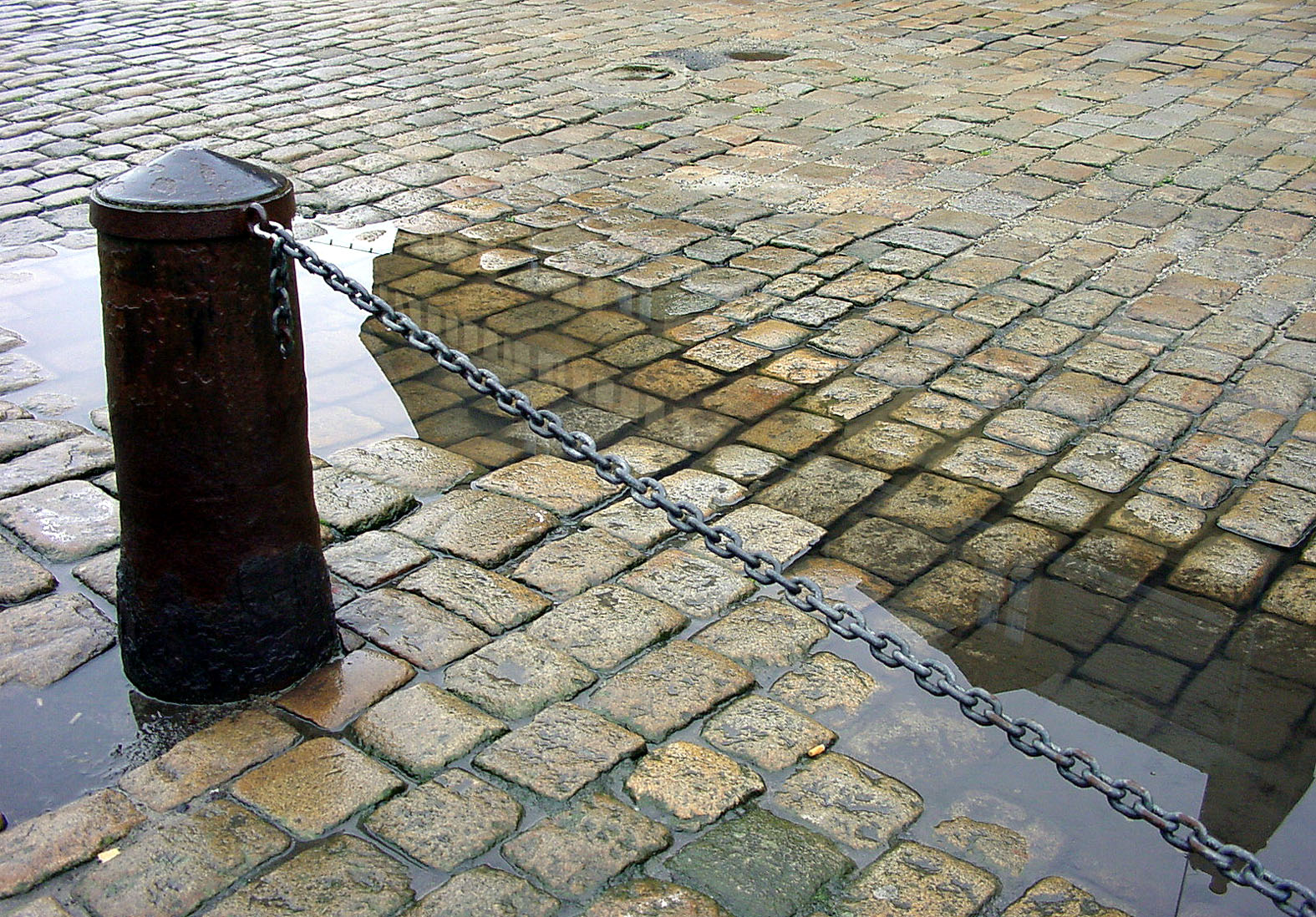
19th century paving on the Benjamin Franklin dock

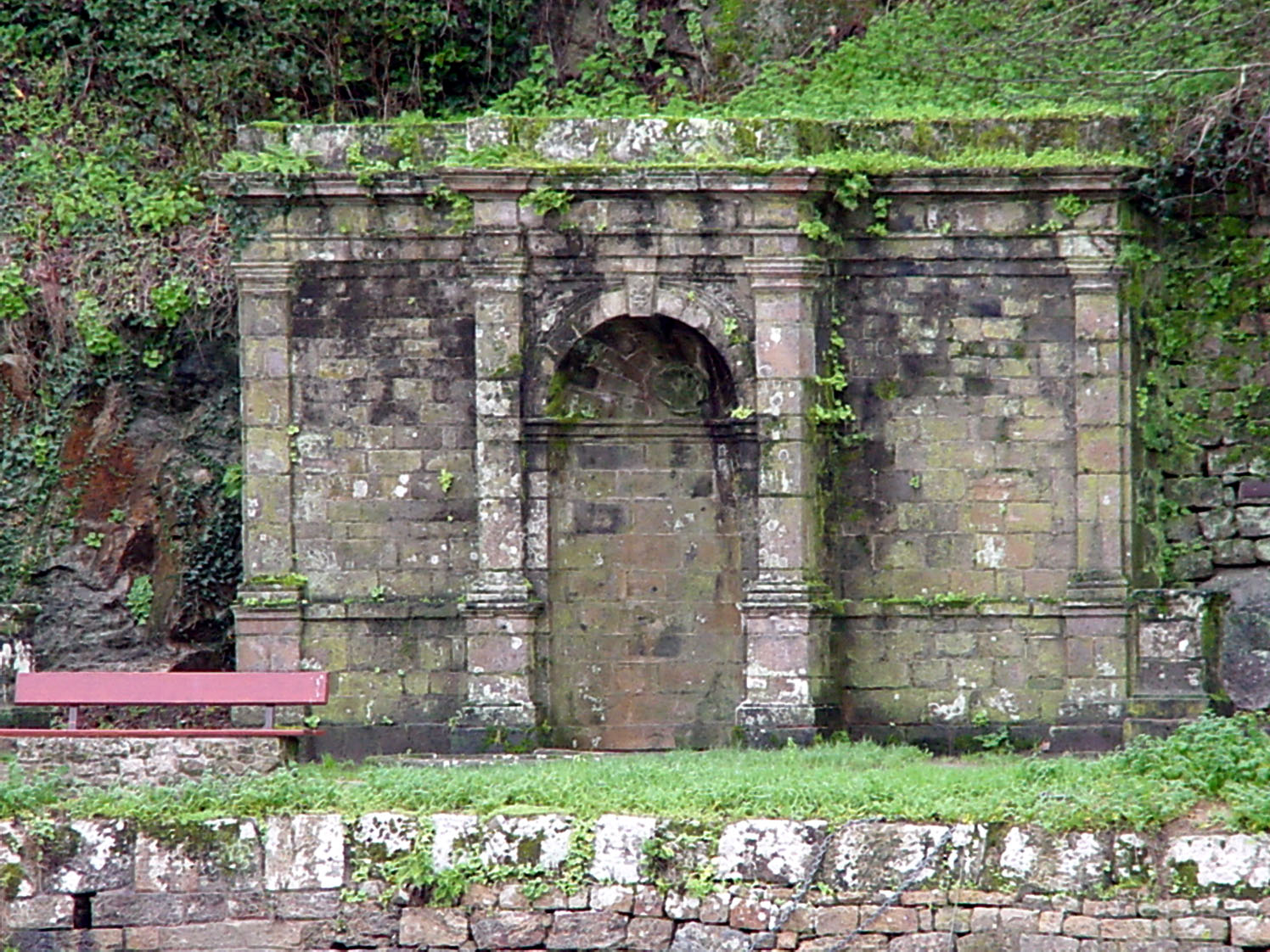
A niche carved of granite opposite the Benjamin Franklin dock

The name of this wharf is a tribute to Benjamin Franklin, the famous diplomat, physicist and engineer who landed at Auray on 3 December 1776 to ask for French aid in the War of Independence. The port, dates back much further, however, to at least the 12th century.

Work began on the dock in 1614 and was extended in 1630. Around 1680, the dock in front of the place Saint-Sauveur was extended further and repaired in 1742. In 1791 it required further repairs which took place from June 1846 to the end of 1852. The quay pavement dates from this time.

The dock deteriorated again, and in 1902 subsided more than 50 cm towards the water. The town council did not want to finance plans proposed by engineers to completely rebuild the wharf 68m away. In 1935, the mayor warned that the dock continued to be a problem and in 1936, it collapsed by about 30m. It took three years before repairs were begun, but the work was completed in 1939.

The dock measures 220m and is classified ZPPAUP (as a protected area) as a monument of the Gulf of Morbihan. The dock is adjacent to restaurants and hotels, and is a venue for markets, art exhibitions, sales of postcards, a carousel and other seasonal activities, as well as sailing instruction. A boat tour to the islands sails from here and an old rigged ship is permanently docked there too. The latter contains a small museum which includes a replica of Saint-Goustan.

The port has been painted by many artists, including Odilon Redon and Mathurin Méheut.

The port became a marina containing approximately 155 moorings next to the dock. It was classified as a departmental port and now receives over 1300 visitors vessels per year (as of 2007).

During the 20th century Saint-Goustan became one of the most popular tourist areas in the Auray area as a result of its picturesqueness and the timbered houses in the town centre. However, the large granite stones of the wharf are gradually disintegrating and tidal erosion has created pockets behind the retaining wall.

At the end of 2008 part of the wharf had subsided and was in danger of collapse. This area is important for the stability of the houses bordering and had to be consolidated with an emergency embankment of large stones. This part of the wharf now need major repairs costing 1.88M Euros which should be undertaken in January 2009. In December 2008, an association was created with the aid of the Heritage Foundation to gather donations to restore the dock.

== Environment ==
The quasi-estuary location and the aid of the presence of mudflats mean that the port and the valley host many species of seabirds. The docks are covered with kelp and local oysters.

The river Auray plays an important part as a natural route for fish and birds. As such it is one of the components of the national environmental framework which is promoted by the Department of the Environment.
