= André Hovelacque =

French anatomist (1880–1939)

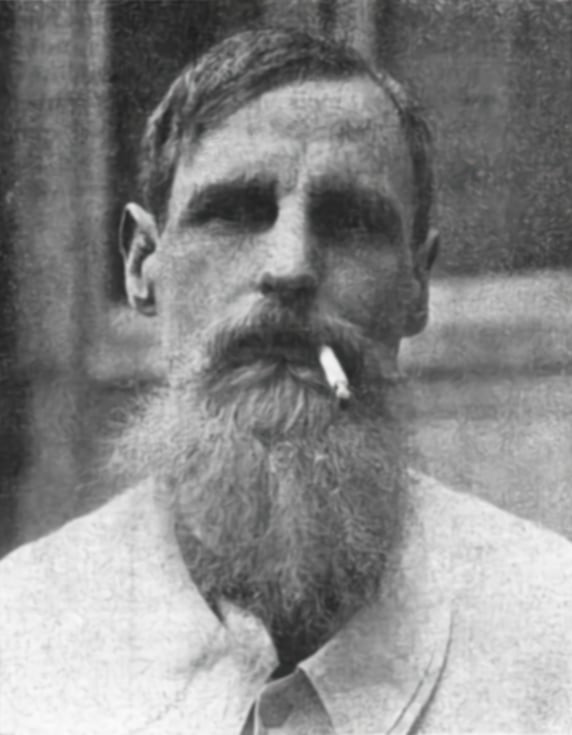
- Born: 29 March 1880; 7th arrondissement of Paris
- Died: 19 July 1939 (aged 59); Paris
- Occupation: Anatomist
- Known for: Studies of the peripheral nervous system
- Spouse: Lévi Alvarès
- Father: Abel Hovelacque

André Édouard Émile Hovelacque (29 March 1880, 7th arrondissement of Paris – 19 July 1939, Paris) was a 20th-century French anatomist who particularly studied the anatomy of the peripheral nervous system.

The son of Abel Hovelacque, he married Madeleine Lévi Alvarès in 1911, herself a physician and great grand niece of David Lévi Alvarès.

== Works ==
- Hovelacque, André (1912). Anatomie descriptive et topographique des racines rachidiennes postérieures;Les divers procédés de radicotomie postérieure (opérations de Foerster), Arthur Van Gehuchten, Guleke) (in French). Nancy: Berger-Levrault.
- Hovelacque, André (1923). Les nerfs crâniens;Anatomie macroscopique (in French). Presses Universitaires de France.
- Hovelacque, André (1927). Anatomie des nerfs crâniens et rachidiens et du système grand sympathique chez l'homme (in French).
