= Abel Hovelacque =

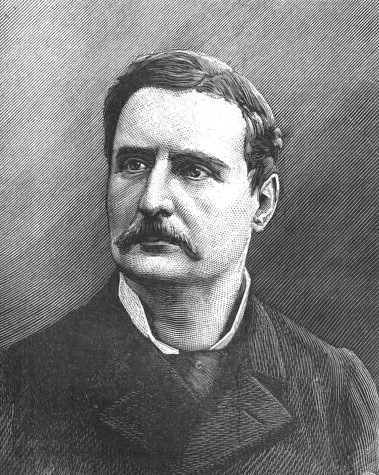
- Hovelacque (1843-1896)
- Born: 14 November 1843; Paris
- Died: 22 February 1896 (aged 52); Paris
- Occupation(s): Linguiste; Anthropologist; Politician

Abel Hovelacque (14 November 1843 – 22 February 1896) was a 19th-century French linguist, anthropologist and politician.

== Biography ==
Abel Hovelacque was a representative of the naturalistic and anthropological linguistics. He studied languages with Honoré Chavée and comparative anatomy with Paul Broca. He was a founder of the École d'anthropologie, in which he was made professor of linguistic ethnography, and of which, after the death of Jules Gavarret, he became director (1890). He was a member of the Society of Anthropology of Paris. In 1886 Hovelacque and Chavée founded the Revue de Linguistique. That same year, he was elected as a member to the American Philosophical Society.

He was also interested in politics. He served on the Conseil municipal de Paris which he presided in 1887–1888. He became MP for Paris (13th) from 1889 to 1894. He was an extreme Republican.

The rue Abel-Hovelacque in Paris was named after him as well as two others in Lille and Saint Etienne. The anatomist André Hovelacque (1880-1939) was his son.

== Publications ==
- Grammaire de la langue zende, Maisonneuve, 1868 Ré-edition Hachette BnF, 2013
- La Linguistique, Reinwald, 1877
- Notre ancêtre, recherches d'anatomie et d'ethnologie sur le précurseur de l'homme, Leroux, 1878
- Études de linguistique et d'ethnographie, Reinwald, 1878
- Les débuts de l'humanité : L'homme primitif contemporain, Doin, 1881
- Les Races humaines, Cerf, 1882

== Sources ==
- Piet Desmet, La linguistique naturaliste en France (1867-1922). Nature, origine et évolution du langage, Louvain, 1994, p. 224-287. Read online.
