= Julio César Oyhanarte =

Argentine jurist (1920–1997)

Julio C. Oyhanarte
- Julio C. Oyhanarte

Justice of the Supreme Court of Argentina
- In office May 1958 – September 1962 Serving with Alfredo Orgaz; Benjamín Villegas Basavilbaso; Aristóbulo Aráoz de Lamadrid; Luis María Boffi Boggero; Esteban Imaz; Pedro Aberastury; Ricardo Colombres
- Appointed by: Arturo Frondizi
- Preceded by: Enrique V. Galli
- Succeeded by: José Federico Bidau

Justice of the Supreme Court of Argentina
- In office November 1989 – April 1991 Serving with Augusto César Belluscio; Eduardo Moliné O'Connor; Carlos Fayt; Ricardo Levene; Julio Nazareno; Rodolfo Barra; Enrique Petracchi
- Appointed by: Carlos Menem
- Preceded by: José Severo Caballero
- Succeeded by: Antonio Boggiano

Personal details
- Born: July 3, 1920 La Plata, Argentina
- Died: April 29, 1997 (aged 76) Buenos Aires, Argentina
- Party: UCRI, UCR
- Spouse: Martha Ríos de Oyhanarte
- Children: Martín, María Martha, and María Victoria
- Profession: Lawyer

Julio César Oyhanarte (July 3, 1920 – April 29, 1997) was an Argentine jurist who served as a Justice of the Supreme Court of Argentina from 1958 to 1962 and from 1989 to 1991.

== Early life and education ==
Julio C. Oyhanarte was born into a family of French Basque descent. He is a descendant of the Basque jurist and poet Arnaud Oihenart. His great-grandfather, Bernardo Oyhanarte, emigrated from France and arrived in Argentina on January 5, 1854. Bernardo Oyhanarte came from the canton of Saint-Jean-Pied-de-Port, after a stopover in Montevideo, aboard the ship Progreso.

From a young age, he was active in the Radical Civic Union (UCR), which his relatives were also part of. His grandfather, Juan Oyhanarte, founded the first committee of the Civic Union in the city of Rojas, and was murdered there because of his political and journalism activities. His father, Raúl Oyhanarte, was a Radical member of the Chamber of Deputies in 1920 and remained a steadfast supporter of Hipólito Yrigoyen. His uncle, Horacio Bernardo Oyhanarte, was a national deputy and served as Foreign Minister during Yrigoyen's second presidency.

He studied law at the National University of La Plata, where he graduated with a gold medal and a perfect grade average of 10. He earned a doctorate from the University of Buenos Aires, with a dissertation titled Los Servicios públicos. Caracterización Jurídica y Nacionalización de las Empresas Prestatarias ("Public Services: Legal Characterization and Nationalization of Service Providers").

== Career ==
He began his professional career in 1949 as an adviser to the UCR caucus in the Senate of the Buenos Aires Province legislature.

After the Revolución Libertadora of September 16, 1955, he was appointed general counsel of the National University of La Plata and professor of constitutional law at the School of Law of the University of Buenos Aires.

In 1957, he was elected a delegate to the Constitutional Convention.

In February 1958, he was elected national deputy for Buenos Aires Province on the ticket of the Intransigent Radical Civic Union (UCRI), but he never took his seat because Arturo Frondizi nominated him to the Supreme Court.

=== Supreme Court ===
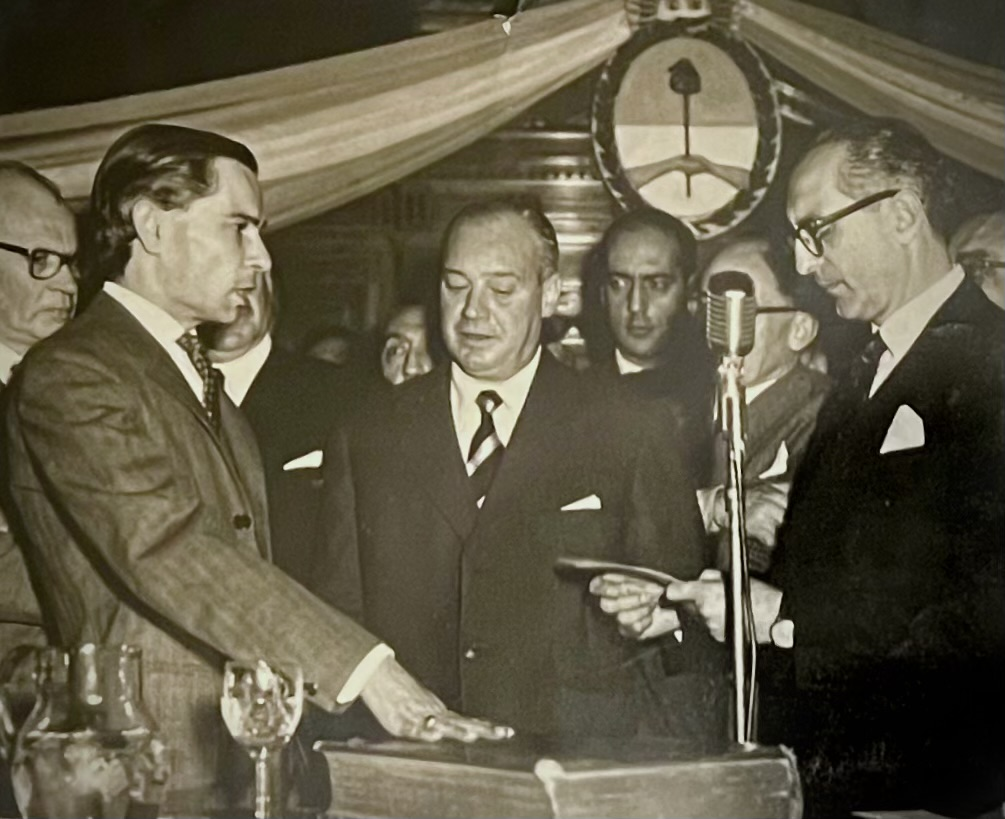
Oyhanarte being sworn in before President Arturo Frondizi, May 1958

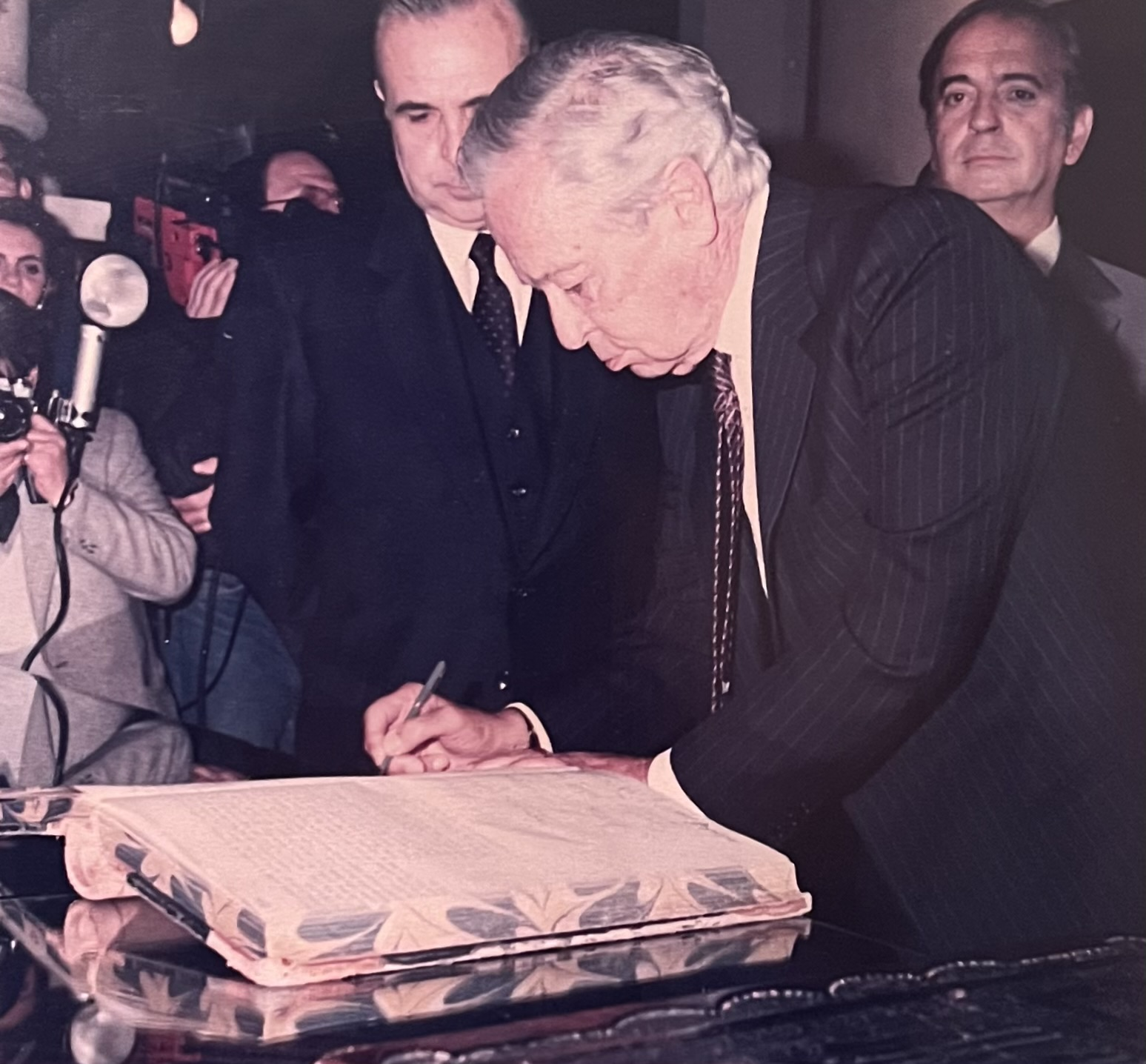
Oyhanarte being sworn in before Chief Justice Enrique S. Petracchi

In 1958, he joined the Supreme Court of Argentina, appointed by President Arturo Frondizi. He was the youngest justice in the history of the court. In the same year, Chief Justice Alfredo Orgaz asked the executive branch to undertake a study on reforming the court and increasing the number of its members.

Oyhanarte played an active and decisive role in bringing about the appointment and swearing-in of José María Guido. Following the military coup of 1962, Oyhanarte's resolute action prevented General Raúl Poggi from assuming the presidency, as he made it possible for Guido to be sworn in, with three journalists accredited at the Palace of Justice signing as witnesses. Oyhanarte was the architect of Guido's assumption of office, which took place while the Armed Forces were preparing to seize the Palace of Justice by force amid violence in the streets.

In November 1989, he was nominated to the Supreme Court for a second time, replacing José Severo Caballero. His appointment was therefore not a result of the expansion of the Supreme Court under Law 23.774, which was not enacted until April 11, 1990. In April 1991, shortly after taking office, he resigned "for personal reasons."

== Legacy ==
For several years, Oyhanarte donated the entirety of the retirement benefits he received as a former justice of the Supreme Court of Argentina to the Association of Magistrates and Officials of the National Judiciary. The donations were used to support the modernization of the courts and to fund the association's library.

The Faculty of Law at Universidad Austral established the "Dr. Julio C. Oyhanarte" Gold Medal Award in his honor. The distinction is awarded to the law graduate who achieves the highest grades in Public Law.

== Personal life and family ==
Oyhanarte was a well-known supporter of the Boca Juniors football club. He was married until his death to Martha Ríos, the third daughter of Zulema Valerio and Eduardo Ríos, an appellate judge in the Buenos Aires provincial judiciary. The couple had three children: Martín, María Martha, and María Victoria.

== Books and articles ==
- Poder político y cambio estructural en la Argentina. Un estudio sobre el Estado de Desarrollo [Political Power and Structural Change in Argentina: A Study of the Developmental State]. Paidós, 1969.
- "Historia del Poder Judicial" [History of the Judiciary]. Todo Es Historia, no. 61, 1972.
- La expropiación y los servicios públicos [Expropriation and Public Services]. Perrot, 1957.
- Las Inmunidades Parlamentarias [Parliamentary Immunities]. La Ley, 1948.
- Régimen constitucional de las fuentes minerales de energía [The Constitutional Framework for Mineral Energy Sources]. La Ley, 1957.
- Recopilación de sus Obras [Collected Works]. La Ley, 2001.
