= Society of Anthropology of Paris =

French learned society for anthropology

The Society of Anthropology of Paris (French: Société d’Anthropologie de Paris) is a French learned society for anthropology founded by Paul Broca in 1859. Broca served as the Secrétaire-général of SAP, and in that capacity responded to a letter from James Hunt welcoming the news that Hunt had established the Anthropological Society of London.

== Notable members ==
- Leopoldo Batres
- Paul Bert
- Louis-Adolphe Bertillon
- Pruner Bey
- Adolphe Bloch
- Paul Broca
- Richard Stephen Charnock
- Joseph Deniker
- Anténor Firmin
- Louis Pierre Gratiolet
- Abel Hovelacque
- Pierre Huard, professor of medicine, rector of the Université Félix Houphouët-Boigny from 1964 to 1966
- Gustave Lagneau
- Pyotr Lavrov (1823–1900, Russian philosopher)
- Gustave Le Bon (member from 1879 to 1888)
- Charles Letourneau, general secretary from 1887 to 1902.
- Léonce Manouvrier
- Charles Martin Ploix, president in 1880.
- Clémence Royer
- André Sanson
- Paul Topinard
