= Joan Tartas =

Basque cleric and writer from Soule

- Tartaseko Joan
- Born: c. 1610; Probably Chéraute, Soule
- Died: Unknown
- Other names: Jean de Tartas; Juan de Tartas; Ivan Tartas (erroneous)
- Occupations: Clergyman, writer
- Notable work: Onsa hilceco bidia (1666); Arima penitentaren occupatione devotaq (1672)

Joan Tartas (Basque: Tartaseko Joan; French: Jean de Tartas; Spanish: Juan de Tartas; also erroneously known as Ivan Tartas) was a Souletin clergyman and writer in the Basque language, probably born in 1610. His date of death is unknown.

Two of his religious works have survived: Onsa hilceco bidia (1666) and Arima penitentaren occupatione devotaq (1672). These works belong to the corpus of early Basque religious literature and reflect the pastoral and devotional concerns of the clergy in the Basque Country during the 17th century.

== Biography ==
Documentary information about his life is scarce and sometimes contradictory. According to Luis Villasante, Tartas may have been born between 1610 and 1612 into a family of prosperous farmers, and he is said to have begun his early studies with the Clerics Regular of Saint Paul in Lescar in 1624.

It has also been suggested that Sanz de Tartas, who served as proofreader for the 1565 New Testament translation by Joannes Leizarraga, may have been his great-uncle.

== Works ==
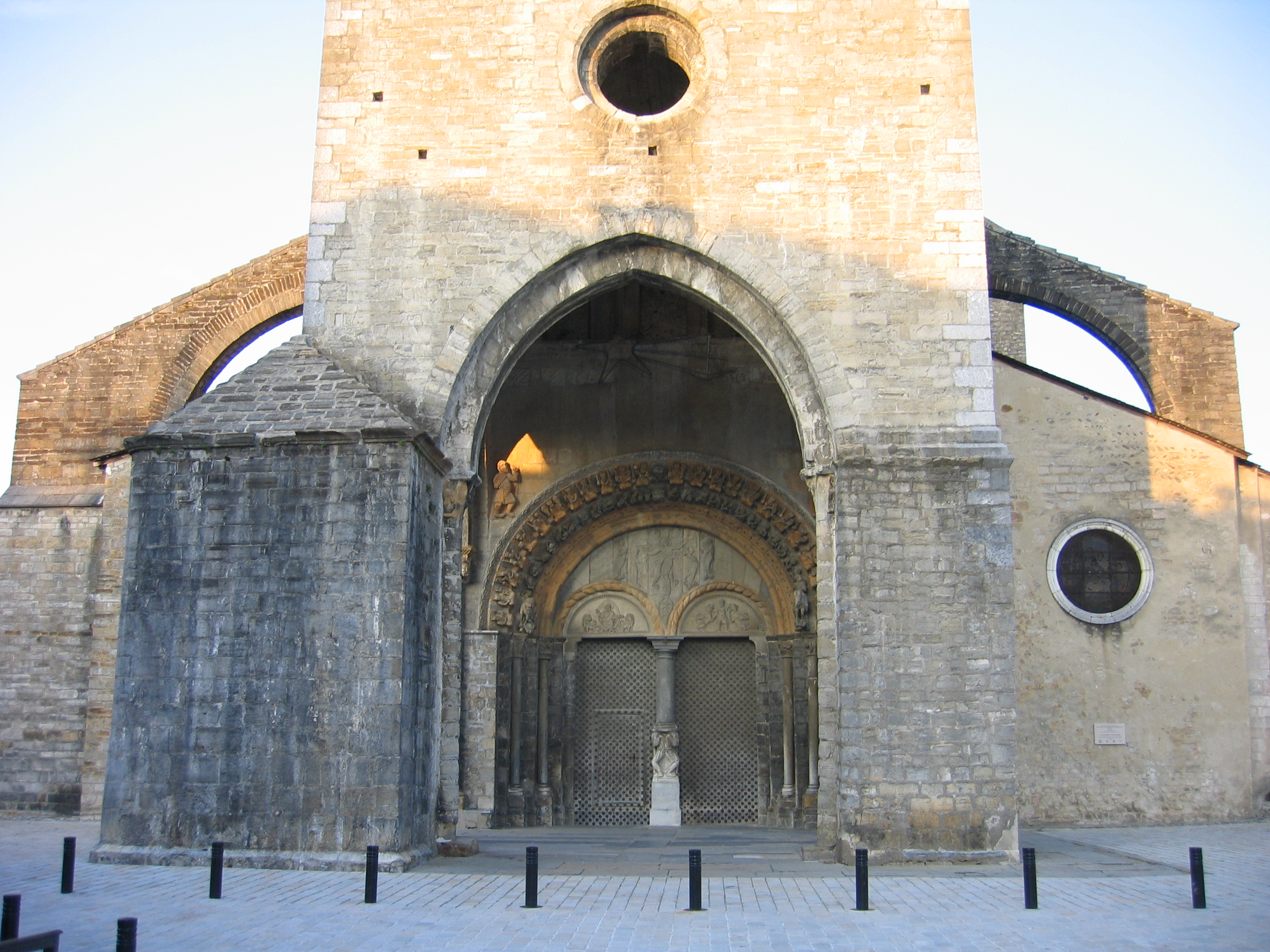
Cathedral of Saint Mary of Olorón, of which Tartas was a canon.

=== Onsa hilceco bidia (1666) ===
Onsa hilceco bidia was published in 1666 and is the earliest surviving work by Joan Tartas, as well as the most studied and widely known. Because a considerable period elapsed between the initial (1633) and final (1641) ecclesiastical approvals, scholars have suggested that the author may have encountered difficulties in obtaining permission to publish the book. These difficulties may have stemmed from the perceived severity of some of the examples used—several of which refer to French monarchs—or from the extensive use of quotations from Latin and pagan authors, toward whom the author occasionally expresses admiration.

==== Theme and style ====
The work is an example of ascetic literature and focuses on the need to prepare properly for death. According to the author, a good life is inseparable from a good death. Tartas summarizes this idea in the following passage:

Ezta halaber hiltçe honic, ezpada, biçitçe honic, onsa hil nahidenac, behardu onsa biçi.

[You can't have a good death if you haven't had a good life. If you want to die well, you need to live well.]

To support his argument, Tartas cites a wide range of sources, including classical authors such as Aristotle and Seneca, the Bible, and Christian writers such as Saint Augustine. The work has often been compared to Gero by Pedro Agerre Axular, as both texts are written in prose, deal with ascetic themes, and display essay-like characteristics, including the frequent use of quotations. However, Tartas's style has been described as less systematic and more limited in rhetorical resources. The book is generally classified as part of the European tradition of religious manuals concerned with individual salvation.

==== Structure ====
According to Tartas himself, the work is organized into four main chapters:

- Chapter 1: «lehenian... paganoen erranaz...» ("firstly... on what the pagans said...").
- Chapter 2: «bigarrenian lege zaharreko eskritura saindiaz» ("secondly, on the old law of the holy scriptures").
- Chapter 3: «Hirugarrenean lege berriaz eta elizako doktor saindiaz» ("thirdly, on the new law and the holy doctors of the Church").
- Chapter 4: «Laugarrenian arrazoin diferentez frogatzea: ontsa hiltzeko bidia dela herioaz eta hilziaz orhitzia» ("fourthly, proving with different reasons: that the way to die well is to remember dying and death").

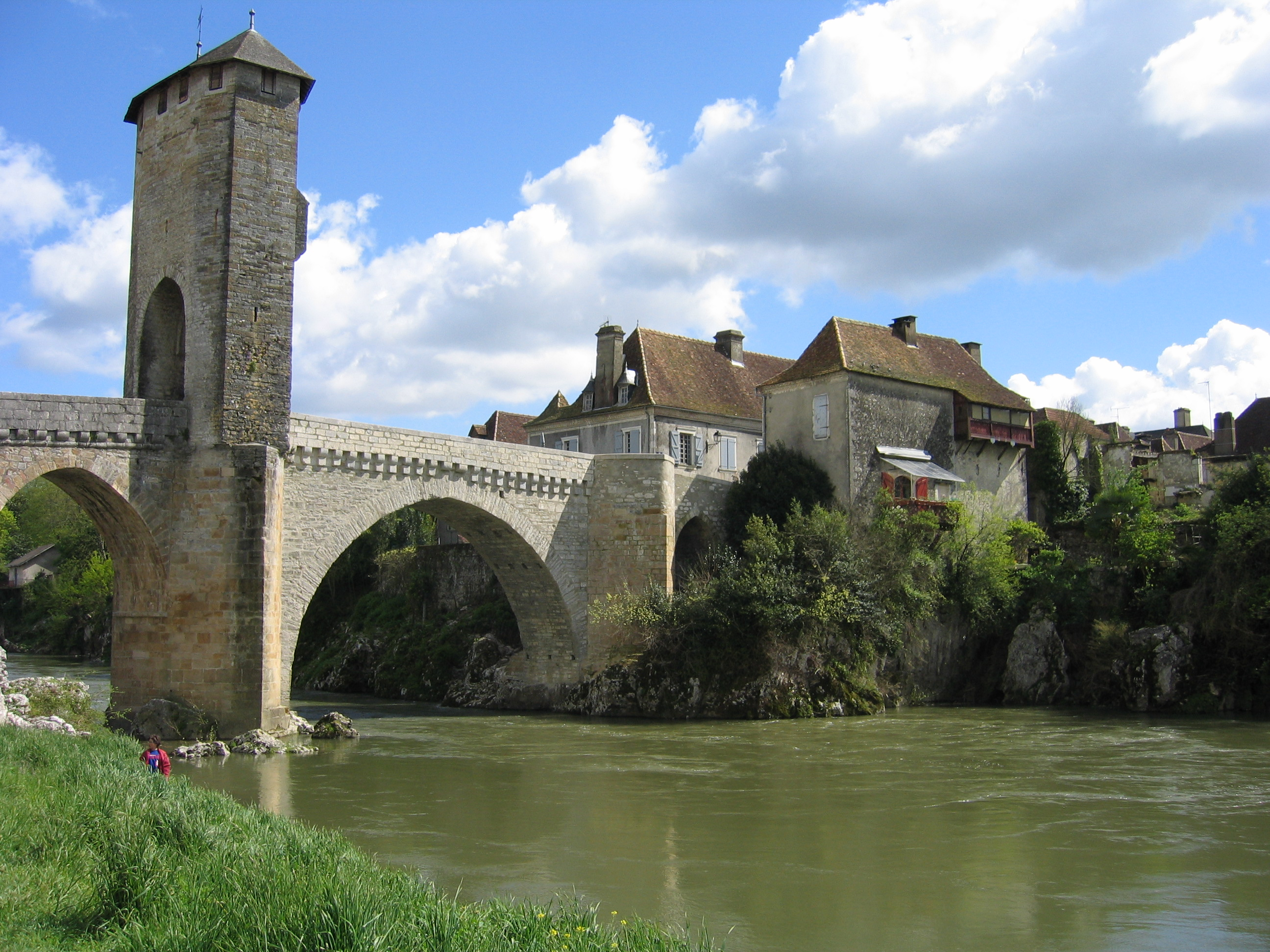
Orthez, place of publication of his second work and where, probably, his spelling was completely changed.

The book concludes with an appendix containing prayers in Basque, the commandments of God and of the Catholic Church, litanies to the Virgin Mary, and several verses dedicated to the author by readers, including Juan de Baguaria, Bonnecase, and P. Darhetz.

=== Arima penitentaren occupatione devotaq (1672) ===
Arima penitentaren occupatione devotaq was published in Orthez by the town's Royal Printer. The edition contains numerous spelling errors and displays a markedly French-influenced orthography, a feature that scholars have sometimes attributed to the printer's intervention. As indicated by its title, the work consists of reflections on Christian devotional practices—particularly prayer, fasting, and almsgiving—with each theme treated in a separate section.

==== Structure ====
- Introduction: written in French and addressed to King Louis XIV of France and the Count of Troisvilles, Jean-Armand du Peyrer, to whom he dedicates this work. The text also contains references praising the author's homeland, particularly Trois-Villes (Iruri in Basque).
- Chapter 1: «Orationia zer den, haren nezesitatia, nolako behar dian izan, zer bertute eta indar dian Jinkoa baitan» ("What prayer is, its necessity, how it should be, and what virtue and strength it has in God"). This chapter discusses the nature and importance of prayer, including the proper manner and circumstances in which it should be performed.
- Chapter 2: «Barura zer den eta haren indarrak zer diren» ("What fasting is and what its strengths are"). This section examines the practice of fasting. Tartas illustrates his discussion with examples, including a reference to an unnamed king of France. He defines the characteristics of proper fasting, lists four circumstances in which it may be broken, provides six examples of how it should be practiced, and emphasizes the need for bodily mortification.
- Chapter 3: «Zer den amoina, nola eta noiz eman behar den, zer den haren indarra eta bertutia» ("What alms are, when and how they must be given, and their strength and virtue"). In this chapter Tartas defines almsgiving, supports its importance with several examples, and recounts two episodes and three related illustrative stories.

The work concludes with three poems dedicated to the author in Latin, French, and Basque; the Basque poem was written by Juan de Baguaria.

== Criticism ==
Tartas utilised the Basque language primarily as a vehicle for pastoral instruction, employing it to disseminate the doctrines of the Catholic Church rather than as an aesthetic or literary medium. Nevertheless, writers such as Pedro Agerre Axular and Tartas himself developed a recognizable prose style with distinctive personal traits. Tartas's writing, for example, is often characterized by a rapid rhythm and a direct tone, features that have led scholars to consider his work worthy of continued study. Critics generally regard his first work, Onsa hilceco bidia, more favorably than his second, Arima penitentaren occupatione devotaq, which has sometimes been described as difficult to read because of its orthographic inconsistencies and strong French influence in spelling.

Tartas's language has been described as relatively unpolished but distinctive and inclined toward wordplay. According to the Carmelite philologist Santi Onaindia, the originality of Tartas's writing lies partly in its unusual and somewhat chaotic character.

The criticisms made by Koldo Mitxelena and Father Luis Villasante in their respective studies of Basque literature have been particularly influential. These scholars highlight a contrast that they consider central to Tartas's originality.

On the one hand, Tartas appears as a "serious", "learned", and "erudite" author. He was a skilled translator, especially from Spanish, French, and Latin into Basque. Mitxelena considered Tartas's erudition to be greater than that of Axular, and noted that some passages—particularly those recounting the lives of monarchs—recall the style of Father Nieremberg. Research by Darricarrére has suggested that these historical anecdotes may have contributed to difficulties with ecclesiastical censorship, possibly explaining the nine-year interval between the earliest and final approvals of Onsa hilceco bidia.

On the other hand, Tartas's mode of expression has sometimes been described as "vulgar", "coarse", or "entertaining", owing to his use of colloquial expressions, direct language, and vivid examples. His punctuation is often inconsistent, and his prose frequently follows a spontaneous and oral style. For modern scholars, however, this spontaneity and closeness to spoken language constitute an important element of the value and originality of his work.

According to literary analyses, Tartas structures his prose by alternating two types of discourse:

- Azalpen-hitzak ("explanatory words"): passages that include stories, examples, and reflections. In these sections the citational function predominates, and the author generally uses the third person.
- Super-hitzetan ("super words"): passages that contain advice, exhortations, and recommendations directed at the reader. These sections often aim to move the audience through an urgent or emotional tone and are typically written in the second person.

Tartas's style shows affinities with the oral tradition and with the rhetoric of sermons. Although it lacks the stylistic refinement often attributed to Axular, rector of Sare, it displays a distinctive narrative rhythm. This dynamic quality of his prose has been regarded as one of the principal merits of his writing and as a feature that distinguishes it from the works of many of his contemporaries.

=== Dialect ===
Koldo Mitxelena initially regarded Tartas as the first author to write in the Souletin dialect. In contrast, although Arnaud Oihenart was a native of Soule, he wrote his works primarily in the Labourd dialect and Low Navarrese dialect. Tartas himself commented on the mixed character of the language used in his works:

ene euskera eztakit aprobatiatzen denez; bai ala ez, badu orotarik zerbait, Zuberoak, Baxanabarrek eta Lapurdik eman drauko zerbait, baina ez oro; Arue-n egin dut neure pieza pobria, hanko lengajia ezpada aski eder, hanko euskerak du ogena, eta ez euskaldunak.

[I do not know if my Basque will be approved; it has a bit of every dialect: Soule, Basse-Navarre, and Labourd have each provided something, though not everything. I wrote my poor book in Aroue; if this language is not beautiful enough, the Basque of that place is at fault and not the Basque speaker.]

According to Piarres Lafitte, the Basque used by Tartas provides useful material for studying the features of the Souletin dialect, although it does not represent a completely pure form of it. Lafitte noted, for example, the absence of the vowel ü, as well as the influence of Labourdian, Low Navarrese, and the local variety spoken in Arue. Subsequently, Mitxelena revised his earlier assessment. Current scholarship generally holds that the variety used by Tartas most likely corresponds to the Amikuze subdialect within the Souletin dialect area.

=== Praise for the author ===
During his lifetime, Tartas's two known works received notable praise from both French and Basque religious figures. In total, the two books contain nine commendatory texts—five in verse and four in prose—an unusually large number for a writer working in the Basque language during the 17th century. These texts attest to the favorable reception of his writings within ecclesiastical circles at the time. Despite this early recognition, Tartas's works later fell into relative obscurity and were largely forgotten for several centuries. References to him remained rare until the 20th century, when scholarly studies by figures such as Patxi Altuna and Koldo Mitxelena renewed academic interest in his life and writings.

The following figures of that time wrote dedications or praises in his prefaces:

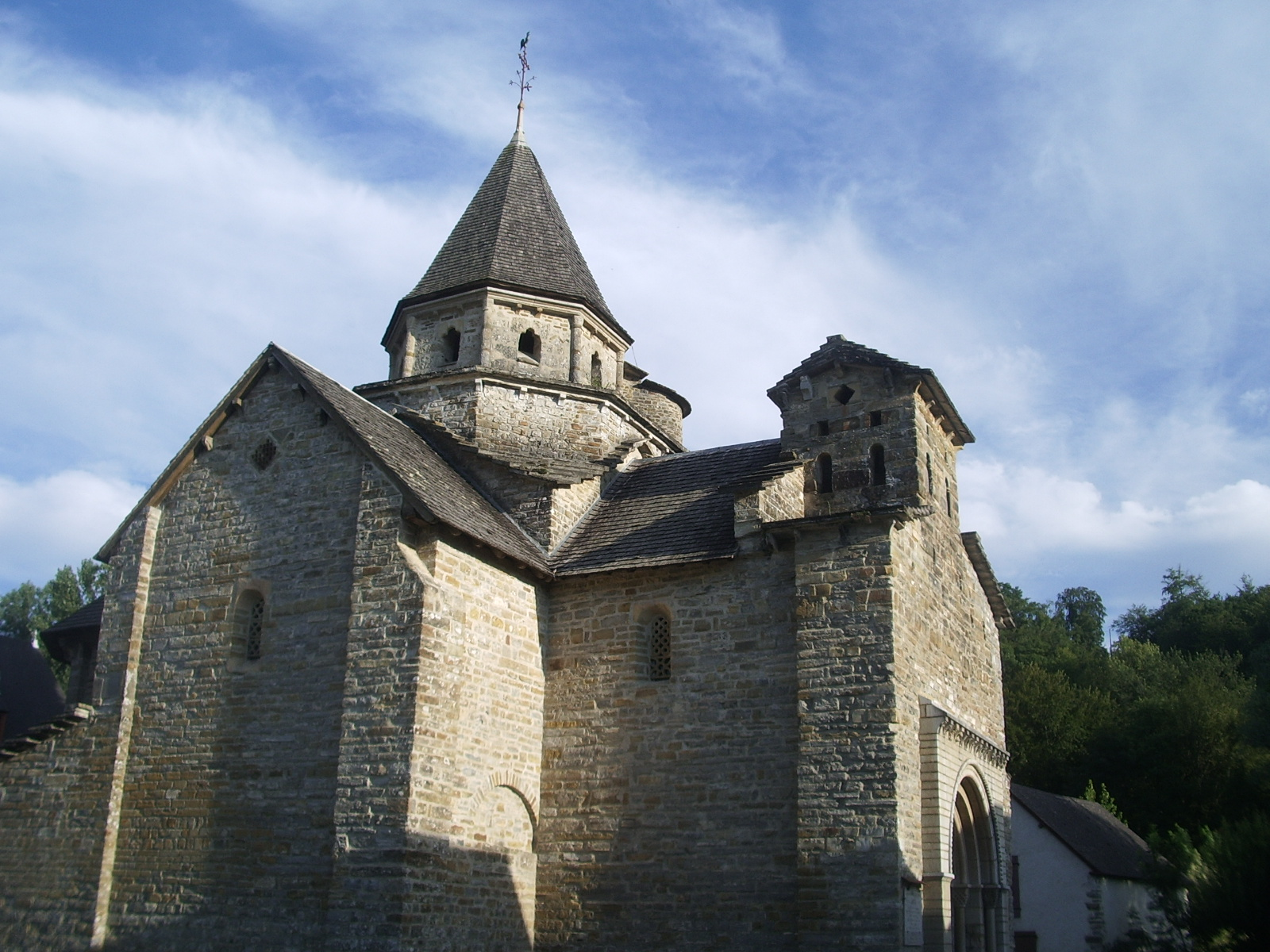
Church of Ospitalepea, where he was parish priest according to his own signature.

- A. de Cognet, rector of Atharratze, vicar of Soule.
- B. Iauregiberri, general and official.
- D. Irunberri, prior of Utziate and vicar of Dax.
- P. Darhetz, lawyer in parliament and judge of Barkoitze.
- Joanes, bishop of Bayonne.
- Juan de Baguaria, rector of Susmio and Camblonque.
- Bonnecase, rector of Mauleón.
- Jacobus de Casedevant, vicar of Gestas.
- D'Abbadie Costere, councillor and procurator of the king in the Land of Soule.

Approximate translation of Autorari, by Juan de Baguaria Cambloque, rector of Susmio:

Euskal Herriak Tartas
Lauda doktor handia
Euskaldun orok harzaz
Dugu libru hautia
Sainduki bizitzeko
Hark doktrina saindia
Zelurat ioaiteko
Emaitendu bidia.

Translation:

The Basque Country praises Tartas
the great doctor
all Basques
have this great book
to live sacramentally
for that holy doctrine
to go to heaven
shows the way.

=== Relation to the School of Sara and Axular ===
In discussions of early Basque literature, Tartas is often considered in relation to the literary circle associated with Sare—commonly referred to as the "School of Sara"—and particularly to the work of Pedro Agerre Axular. According to Luis Villasante, cited by Xabier Kintana in his Historia de la literatura vasca, Tartas's work Onsa hilceco bidia required more than ten years to obtain the necessary ecclesiastical approvals. According to Kintana:

With a century of delay compared to the surrounding literature, following the popular taste of the old tradition and not being fully in agreement with the elegant and official rule of the Church, Onsa hiltzeko bidea needed more than ten years to obtain all the ecclesiastical approvals. It is not at all strange for everyone, comparing it with the Basque literature of the time, that the Souletin's book seems very inopportune or inconvenient.

Nevertheless, Kintana argues that it would be inaccurate to interpret Tartas's work as the result of ignorance or lack of organization. His analysis suggests that the author deliberately prioritized narrative elements over doctrinal exposition, in contrast to Axular. Whereas Axular's works are characterized by a careful balance between quotations and thesis, Tartas places greater emphasis on storytelling and illustrative examples. Kintana therefore suggests that the differences between the two authors reflect distinct literary choices rather than limitations in Tartas's abilities.

Scholars have also pointed to a possible implicit dialogue between Tartas and Axular. In the prologue to Gero, Axular writes:

baldin hala ezpada, euskaldunek berek dute falta eta ez euskarak

[If that's not true, the problem is with the Basques, not the Basque language.]

Tartas appears to respond to this idea in the prologue to his own work, stating:

[...] hanko (Arueko) lengajia ezpada aski eder, hanko euskarak dü hogena eta ez euskaldünek

[[...] if the language of that place (Arue) is not beautiful enough, the fault lies with the Basque of that place and not with the Basques)]

According to Kintana, these statements can be interpreted as indirect responses to one another, suggesting that Tartas was familiar with Axular's work and did not fully share his perspective. While Axular sought to give equal importance to both content and form—contributing to the refined and carefully structured character of his language—Tartas placed greater emphasis on the message conveyed by the text than on stylistic elaboration. As a result, his Basque is often described as less polished and more limited in rhetorical resources, but at the same time more natural and conversational in tone.
