= Lucien Adam =

French linguist (1833–1918)

- Born: 1833; Nancy, France
- Died: 1918 (aged 84–85)
- Occupation: Linguist

Lucien Adam (full name Quirin-François Lucien Adam) (Nancy, France 1833– Rennes, France 1918) was a French magistrate, who had a productive second career as a linguist specializing in Americanist studies. He published grammatical studies of many American languages. He is also remembered as a key player in a controversy surrounding the purported Taensa language.

== Life ==
Lucien Adam was born in Nancy, France. He became known for his writings on eastern Ural–Altaic dialects, and for writings on the Cree and Ojibwe dialects of the Algonquin language family. The International Congress of Americanists was organized in 1875. Due to lack of interest in the United States, it held its first meeting in Nancy in July 1875. Lucien Adam was Secretary at this meeting, and read a paper on "Fusang, of the Chinese Discovery of America."

Adam was one of the first to give the "substratist" theory of the origins of creole languages in general terms. In French Guiana and Trinidad he found that French words were added to a West African system of pronunciation and grammar, while in Mauritius they were added to a Malagasy language sub-stratum.

In the 1882 a book was published by a French Seminary student, Jean Parisot, that claimed to be the grammar and other material of the hitherto undocumented Taensa language spoken by a people of Louisiana. The Grammaire et vocabulaire de la langue Taensa, avec textes traduits et commentés par J.-D. Haumonté, Parisot, L. Adam was published in 1882 in Paris and caused a stir among linguists. When the material was published, Adam provided commentary and Julien Vinson gave his support. Later, experts in American linguistics became increasingly convinced that the work was a hoax, but Adam was slow to withdraw his support.

He played an important role as an author and editor the Collection linguistique américaine, which was founded in 1871 by the Colombian linguist Ezequiel Uricoechea. In 1878, he took charge of the series and renamed it Bibliothèque linguistique américaine starting with volume 6 (1880)—out of the twenty-five volumes published in total up to 1903. In 1878 he took over as director of the collection and renamed it Bibliothèque linguistique américaine. A total of 25 volumes were published until 1903.

In 1886, Adam was elected as a member to the American Philosophical Society.

== Selected works ==
- Adam, Lucien (1861). La Question américaine. De l'abolition de l'esclavage aux États-Unis.
- Adam, Lucien (1873). Grammaire de la langue mandchou. Maisonneuve et cie.
- Adam, Lucien (1874). Grammaire de la langue tongouse. Maisonneuve et cie.
- Adam, Lucien (1876). Esquises d'une grammaire comparée des dialectes cree et chippeway. Maisonneuve.
- Bretón, Raymond; Adam, Lucien; Leclerc, Charles (1877). Grammaire caraïbe. Maisonneuve.
- Adam, Lucien (1878). Examen Grammatical Comparé de Seize Langues Américaines. Maisonneuve et Cie.
- Adam, Lucien (1881). Les patois lorrains. Grosjean-Maupin.
- Parisot, Jean; Haumonté, Jean Dominique; Adam, Lucien (1882). Grammaire et vocabulaire de la langue Taensa: avec textes traduits et commentés (in French). Harvard University. Paris: Maisonneuve et cie.
- Adam, Lucien (1882). Les Classifications, l'object, la méthode, les conclusions de la linguistique.
- Adam, Lucien (1883). Les idiomes négro-aryen et maléo-aryen, essai d'hybridologie linguistique.
- Adam, Lucien; Parisot, Jean (1885). Dom Parisot ne produira pas le manuscrit Taensa. Lettre, etc.
- Adam, Lucien; Brinton, Daniel Garrison (1885). Le Taensa a-t-il été forgé de toutes pièces. Maisonneuve.
- Adam, Lucien (1885). Grammaire de la langue jâgane.
- François, Quirin; Adam, Lucien (1887). La langue chiapanèque: Observations grammaticales, vocabulaire méthodique, textes inédits, textes rétablis. A. Hœlder.
- Adam, Lucien (1891). Langue mosquito: grammaire, vocabulaire, texts. J. Maisonneuve.
- Adam, Lucien; LaCueva, R.P. (1893). Principes Et Diccionnaire de la Langue Yucarare Ou Yurujure. Maissonneuve.
- Adam, Lucien (1897). Matériaux pour servir à l'établissement d'une grammaire comparée des dialectes de la famille Kariri. J. Maisonneuve.
- Adam, Lucien (1905). Grammaire de l'Accawai.
