= Thomas Bendyshe =

English barrister and academic

Thomas Bendyshe (1827–1886) was an English barrister and academic, known as a magazine proprietor and translator.

== Life ==
He was the fourth son of John Bendyshe R.N. and his wife Catherine Matcham, a niece of Lord Nelson. He was educated at Eton College, and matriculated at King's College, Cambridge in 1845, graduating B.A. in 1849 and M.A. in 1852.

Bendyshe was admitted to the Inner Temple in 1848, and was called to the bar in 1857. He became in 1846 a Fellow of King's College, a position he kept for the rest of his life.

In college matters, Bendyshe as a Senior Fellow objected to financial reforms. Considered "eccentric", he obstructed them for nearly 20 years, and was the only Fellow to claim money in a compromise solution proposed by the Visitor. A settlement, the Eirenicon, emerged in 1872. The memoirs of Augustus Austen Leigh record Bendyshe's 1870 effort to retain the right to dine separately in the college hall. According to Montague Rhodes James, Richard Okes, Provost before Leigh, brought to all college meetings a piece of paper with a reprimand of the Visitor to Bendyshe, in case he ever attended, for a "profane letter he had sent to the Dean."

Bendyshe died at Buckland, Kent on 21 July 1886.

== Associations ==
Bendyshe was a vice-president of the Anthropological Society. This was at the period, during the American Civil War, during which Thomas Henry Huxley and John Lubbock, in the Darwinian evolutionary camp, were using the long-established Ethnological Society to attack this new rival, described by Desmond as "ultra-racist".

In 1865 Bendyshe bought The Reader, a magazine set up by Thomas Hughes and Norman Lockyer. Its science section, written by Lockyer, had been used to publicise the views of the Darwinian X Club. Bendyshe frustrated them by this move, closing down the science section. He edited The Reader for something under a year, the end coming in January 1867. Alfred Russel Wallace took it well, telling Darwin that Bendyshe was "the most talented man" in the Anthropological Society. The purchase was made in August: in the previous month Bendyshe had voted in Westminster for the Liberal John Stuart Mill, leading (this was an open ballot) to his expulsion from the Conservative Club. Mill had attended the March 1865 meeting called to decide what to do with the failing paper.

According to James, there was as well Bendyshe's failed The Reflector. He had trouble getting the printers to accept his copy. He also offended in a review Robert Gordon Latham, author of The Natural History of Varieties of Men, associated with the Ethnological Society.

Over Christmas 1868, A. C. Swinburne stayed at King's College as Bendyshe's guest. According to Edmund Gosse, who calls Bendyshe a "fantastic character" in his essay "A Poet among the Cannibals", they had been introduced by Richard Burton at The Cannibal Club. They studied together the French translation of the Mahabharata by Hippolyte Fauche.

== Works ==
Bendyshe's major work, from 1865, was The Anthropological Treatises of Johann Friedrich Blumenbach for the Anthropological Society. It was an edition in translation of Latin works by Johann Friedrich Blumenbach. Included also, in translation, were: a biographical memoir by Karl Friedrich Heinrich Marx; another memoir, by Jean Pierre Flourens; an account of the "Blumenbachian Museum", by Rudolf Wagner; and a dissertation from 1775 by John Hunter M.D. on the "varieties of man". Blumenbach's 1775 doctoral dissertation De varietatis humani varietate nativa is accompanied by its third edition from 1795, both as translated by Bendyshe.

The dissertation by Hunter actually takes a different line from Blumenbach's later views, Hunter on the matter of human diversity being "staunchly monogenist and environmentalist". Blumenbach, noted for his theory of racial classification, began with the rejection of polygenist and chain of being views of race, regarding environmental forces as key; but later cited a nisus formativus (de:Bildungstrieb) tracing back to Immanuel Kant's vitalism of 1773. Bendyshe disagreed with the interpretation of Flourens, that Blumenbach was a monogenist, calling that view a "singular mistake" in terms of the "unity of the human genus".

The English translations from Blumenbach were not the first, and their value has been put in question, with Michael asserting that uncritical use of Bendyshe's edition has led to incorrect conclusions detrimental to Blumenbach's reputation. Michael argues that two translators worked on them, and one of those introduced some systematic errors in the language used in the English version. In particular he states that an article by Stephen Jay Gould, proposing that Blumenbach's work on race was undermined by aesthetic views, is flawed in ways including the use made of Bendyshe's edition.

In the Memoirs of the Anthropological Society, Bendyshe wrote in 1863, the year of the Society's foundation, "The History of Anthropology". For the Memoirs he also translated the 1721 dissertation Dissertatio critica de hominibus orbis nostri incolis specie et ortu by Vincentius Rumpf (which has been incorrectly attributed to Johann Albert Fabricius). It argued for the inheritance of acquired characters, in connection with climatic variation of race.

== Views ==
Bendyshe wrote in 1864 in the Society's Anthrological Review an article "On the Extinction of Races". His view on the Aboriginal Australians was that their population decline was caused by "promiscuous intercourse, artificial abortion, infanticide, wars, diseases, and poverty". James Hunt of the Society concurred. Lorimer considers this an example of the joint use of racist and Malthusian arguments.

According to Adrian Desmond, Bendyshe, Hunt and James McGrigor Allan were major proponents of the views of the polygenist Carl Vogt. Bendyshe was impressed by the diversity of African skulls, but did not conclude that the Africans were a different species of human, making his attitude more nuanced than some others. He dissented at length from Hunt's negative position stated in 1864 as an address "On the Negro's Place in Nature" on civilisation.
