= The Reader (weekly) =

The Reader was a British weekly published from 1863 to 1867. Intended as a review journal, for both science and literature, it has been called "probably the last attempt, in Victorian England, to keep together liberal scientists, theologians, and men of letters."

== History ==
The Reader was set up in 1862 by Thomas Hughes and Norman Lockyer, neighbours in Wimbledon, to cover art, religion and science. The first issue appeared on 3 January 1863. The original backers were Christian Socialists. Some of those were bought out, in 1864, by associates of the X Club. The alliance of the groups was uneasy. The Reader was sold in autumn 1865 to Thomas Bendyshe. There were 211 weekly numbers, and the final issue appeared on 12 January 1867.

== Editorial staff ==
The first editor was John Malcolm Ludlow, who was succeeded by David Masson. In aiming to review books of all sorts, The Reader resembled in its approach the models Monthly Review and Critical Review of the 18th century. They were followed by J. Dennis, and Thomas Bendyshe.

The editors of the science section were Thomas Henry Huxley and John Tyndall. Lockyer initially had had that job. With Herbert Spencer, he tried to turn around The Reader in 1864 by expanding its science content. But the December 1864 editorial "Science and Church Policy" by Huxley damaged circulation, by offending Christian Socialists. There came to be flexibility of roles, with Frederick Pollock (1815–1888) taking on some responsibility in mid-1865.

== Contributors ==
In April 1863 a list of 51 contributors was published.

- George Edward Roberts
- Alfred Russel Wallace contributed eight papers
- John Richard de Capel Wise

== Legacy ==
While the scientific content of The Reader ended with Bendyshe's ownership, the scientific group supplying it was the milieu for the founding of Nature in 1869. As far as Bendyshe's interests in human diversity went, James Hunt set up as successor the Popular Magazine of Anthropology in early 1866.
