= The Cannibal Club =

Dining club

- Founded: 1863
- Founders: Sir Richard Francis Burton, Dr James Hunt
- Location: London, United Kingdom

The Cannibal Club was a Victorian dining club associated with the Anthropological Society of London, likely founded at the same time in 1863 by Sir Richard Francis Burton and Dr James Hunt. The club met in Bartolini's dining rooms near Fleet Street, London. Its official symbol was a mace carved to look like an African head gnawing on a human thighbone. The club's name is thought to derive from Burton's interest in cannibalism which he regretted that he never witnessed on his travels. Club members included: Richard Monkton Milnes, Charles Bradlaugh, Algernon Swinburne, Sir James Plaisted Wilde, General Studholme John Hodgson, Charles Duncan Cameron, Dunbar Isidore Heath, Richard Stephen Charnock, Charles Carter Blake, and Thomas Bendyshe.

Cannibal Catechism

Preserve us from our enemies
Thou who art Lord of suns and skies
Whose meat and drink is flesh in pies
And blood in bowls!
Of thy sweet mercy, damn their eyes
And damn their souls.

— Algernon Charles Swinburne

In his biography of Burton, Dane Kennedy suggests that "the very name of the new club signaled the determination of its organizers to create an atmosphere where subjects deemed deviant by society could receive an open airing" and to liberate its participants from "the sober, 'scientific' etiquette that governed the proceedings of the Anthropological Society".

Burton's brother-in-law and father-in-law attended the club's meetings which he facetiously referred to as "orgies". Kennedy argues that the club's function has been widely misunderstood. The Cannibal Catechism – written by Swinburne for the club – as well as the club's membership, suggest that the dinners served as an opportunity for renowned radicals and social misfits to air their views: "The Cannibal Club was much more than a meeting place for homosocial merriment; it was in fact a venue for venting what were considered at the time subversive opinions about religion, race, sex, and much more."

After Hunt's death in 1869, the club fell into decline, and in February 1871, Burton called what would be its last meeting. According to Edmund Gosse, "The members dined together, and 'enjoyed a delightful evening,' but, as frequently happens in such cases, the old spirit could not be galvanised into new life. The Cannibal Club met no more."

== Bibliography ==
- Gosse, Edmund (1921). "A Poet Among the Cannibals". Books on the Table. London: William Heinemann. pp. 63–66.
- Kennedy, Dane (2005). The Highly Civilized Man: Richard Burton and the Victorian World. Harvard University Press. ISBN 978-0-674-02552-3.
- Lovell, Mary S. (1998). A Rage to Live: A Biography of Richard and Isabel Burton. London: Abacus. ISBN 978-0-349-11016-5.
- Wallen, John (2016). "The Cannibal Club". New Perspectives on Sir Richard Burton. Bethesda, Dublin, Palo Alto: Academica Press. pp. 29–38. ISBN 978-1-936320-87-5.
