= Achille-Louis Foville =

French neurologist and psychiatrist

Achille-Louis Foville (6 August 1799 – 22 June 1878) was a French neurologist and psychiatrist. He produced the first description of the terminal stria.

== Life ==
Foville was born in Pontoise, France and received his medical doctorate in 1824, after studying medicine under Léon Louis Rostan and Jean Étienne Dominique Esquirol at Pitié-Salpêtrière Hospital. His medical thesis argued mental illness may be curable, discussing some treatments of the day and their apparent effectiveness. The next year, he was made the medical superintendent of the Saint-Yon asylum in Rouen. During his time there he published several papers on disorders of the nervous system which were well received. His son Achille-Louis-François Foville was born in 1831. He remained at the asylum until 1833, when ill health forced his resignation.

Foville spent time travelling abroad, to Africa and America. He returned to France, settling in Paris. After the death of his former teacher Esquirol in 1840, Foville was made a professor at Charenton. Until the appointment Thomas Hodgkin had been attempting to open a facility for the treatment of mental illnesses to compete with the York Retreat. With Foville's appointment to Charenton, he was no longer willing to relocate to England, and Hodgkin dropped the project, feeling no other doctors were suitable to run the facility.

The French Revolution of 1848 cost him his job at Charenton, and Foville took up private practice in Paris. He practised medicine in Paris, treating mental disorders, until 1868, when he retired. He moved to Toulouse after his retirement, where he died in 1878.

== Works ==
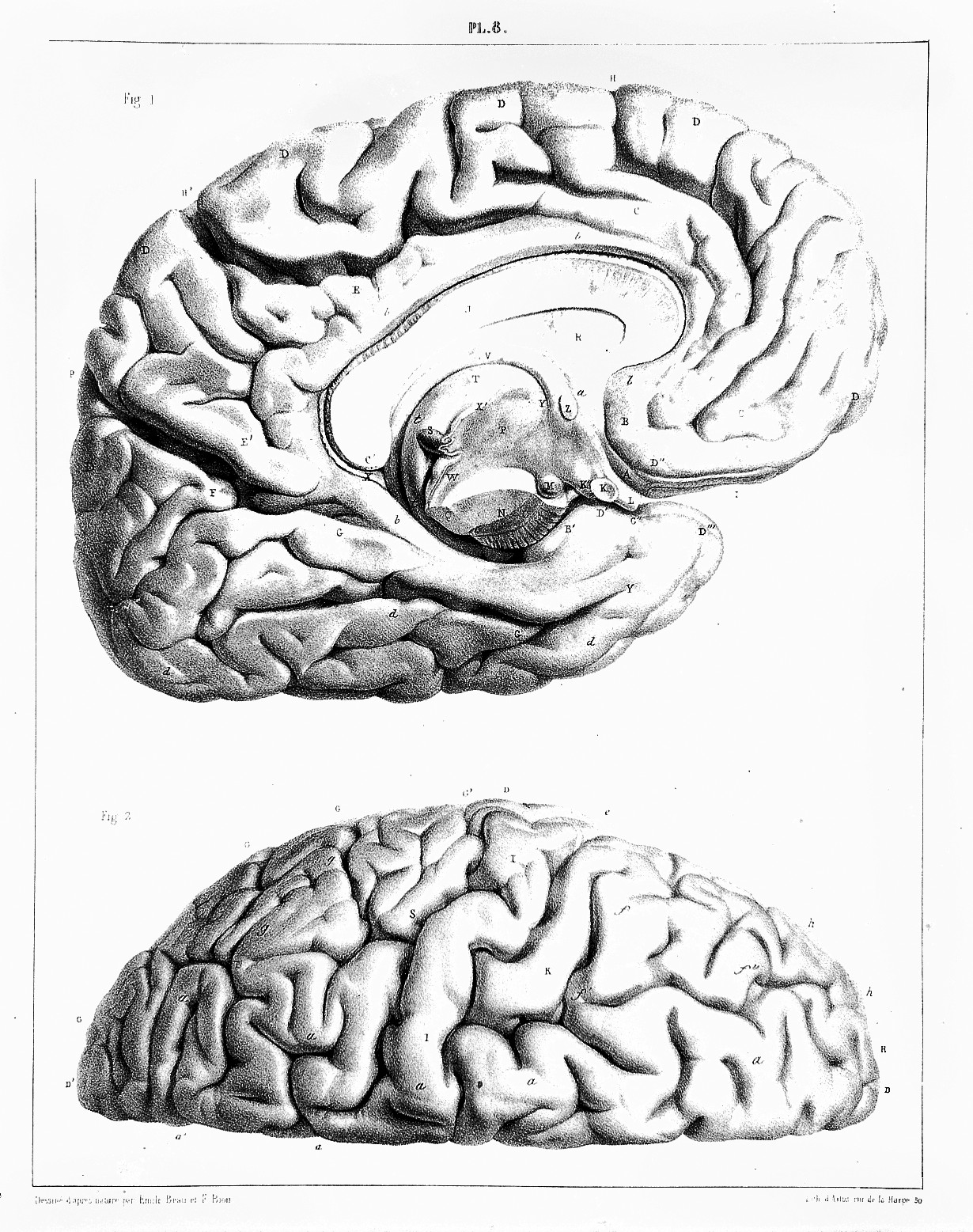
Illustration from Traité complet de l'anatomie

In 1844 Foville published Traité complet de l'anatomie, de la physiologie et de la pathologie du système nerveux cérébro-spinal on the anatomy of the nervous system of the spinal cord, regarded as one of the best works on the subject prior to the invention of the microscope.
