= Fanny Corbaux =

British painter and biblical commentator (1812–1883)

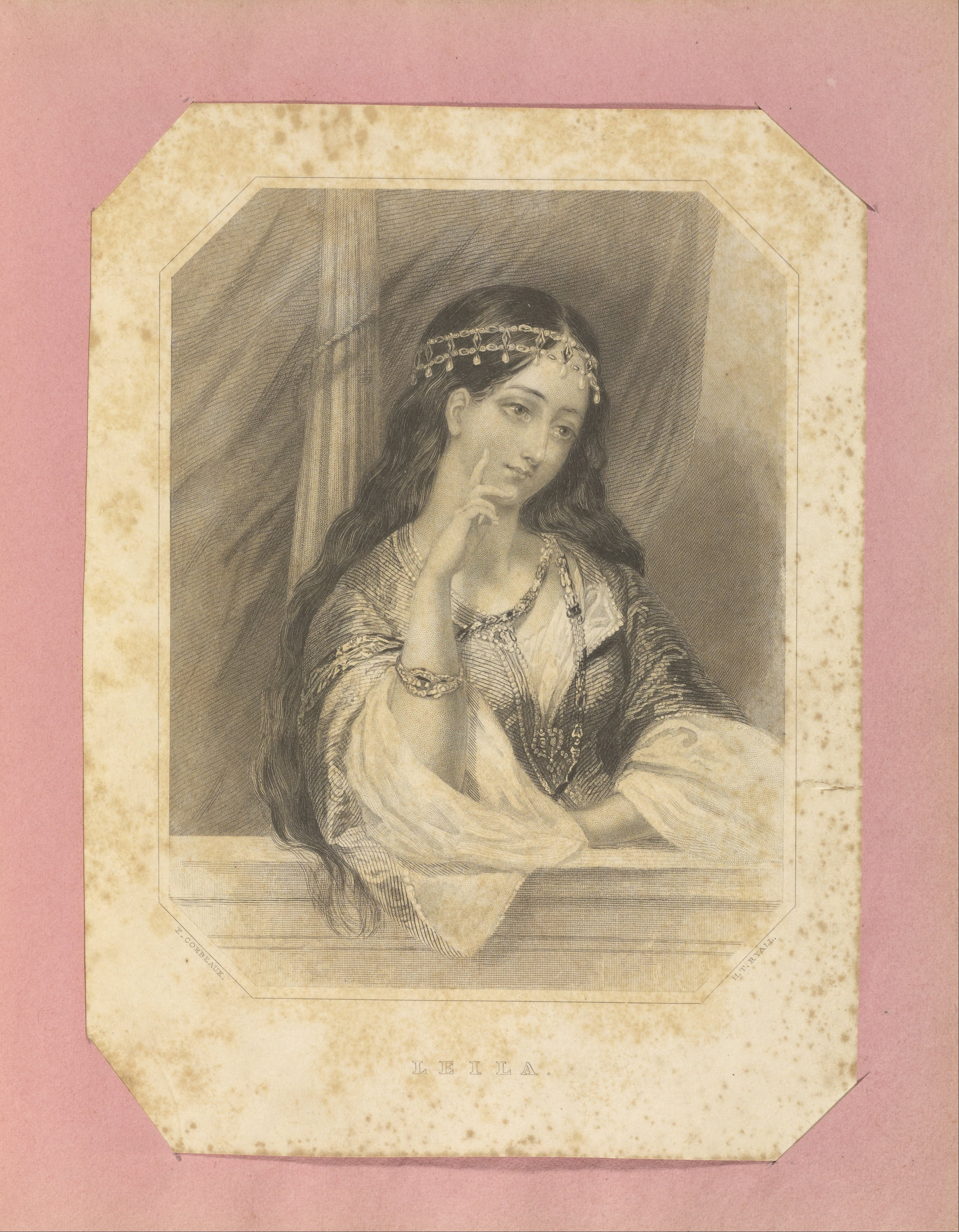
Leila (1845)

Marie Françoise Catherine Doetger "Fanny" Corbaux (1812–1883) was a British painter and biblical commentator. She was also the inventor of kalsomine (calcimine), whitewash with added zinc oxide.

== Life ==
Corbaux was born in Paris, the daughter of Francis Corbaux, an English-born statistician and mathematician, the author of the Dictionnaire des Arbitrages des Changes, and the Doctrine of Compound Interest, who spent much of his life abroad. When she was about fifteen her father was reduced to poverty, and, despite a minimal artistic education, she was obliged to use her talent for painting to earn money. She later remembered:

"I tried to use colours; but so little idea had I of painting, that when the well-known coloured print, 'Gaston de Foix,' was lent me to copy, I remember my extreme anxiety to copy the appearance of the engraving, by imitating its lines of shading, in the armour and draperies, with the colour.

She quickly developed her talents, and in 1827 she was awarded the large silver medal of the Society of Arts for an original miniature portrait, the silver Isis medal for a copy of figures in water-colours, and the silver palette for a copy of an engraving. In 1828 an original composition of figures in watercolours again won her the silver Isis medal, and a miniature portrait, exhibited in 1830, the gold medal. During these years she studied by making copies at the National Gallery and the British Institution. In 1830 she was elected an honorary member of the Society of British Artists, and for a few years exhibited small oil paintings at its gallery, but later abandoned the medium, and joined the New Society of Painters in Water-Colours in 1839.

She exhibited 86 works at the Royal Academy between 1829 and 1854, fifteen at the British Institution and 48 at the Society of British Artists.

She drew a set of illustrations for Thomas Moore's Pearls of the East (1837), and another for Cousin Natalia's Tales (1841). The designs for the "Pearls of the East" were lithographed by her sister, Louisa. A critic in the Literary Gazette said that Corbaux had "depicted oriental beauty in all its varieties of voluptuous languor and fascinating vivacity".

In 1839 Corbaux took out a patent, jointly with Francis Gybbon Spilsbury and Alexander S. Byrne for what was described as an "improvement in the mode of applying distemper colors, having albumen or gelatin for the vehicle, so as to render the same more durable, and preserving the same when not wanted for immediate use."

Corbaux gained a reputation as a biblical critic for her contributions to periodicals and literary societies on subjects relating to scriptural history. They included her Letters on the Physical Geography of the Exodus, published in the Athenæum, and a series on the Rephaim for the Journal of Sacred Literature. She also wrote a historical and chronological introduction to The Exodus Papyri, by D.I. Heath (1855).

She received a civil list pension of £50 from 1871, and died at Brighton on 1 February 1883.

== Sources ==
This article incorporates text from a publication now in the public domain: Cooper, Thompson (1887). "Corbaux, Marie Françoise Catherine Doetter" . In Stephen, Leslie (ed.). Dictionary of National Biography. Vol. 12. London: Smith, Elder & Co.
