= Thomas Hodgkin =

English pathologist (1798–1866)

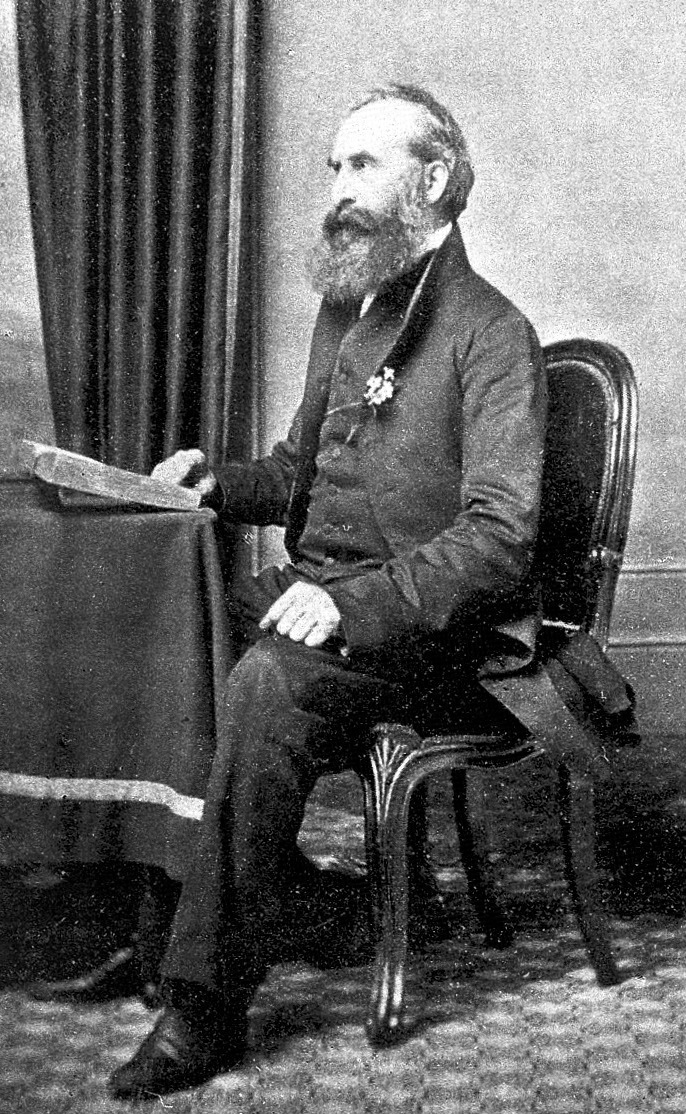
- Born: Thomas Hodgkin; 17 August 1798; Pentonville, Middlesex, England
- Died: 5 April 1866 (aged 67); Jaffa, Jerusalem Sanjak, Ottoman Palestine
- Education: St Thomas's Hospital Medical School; University of Edinburgh
- Father: John Hodgkin
- Scientific career
- Known for: Preventive medicine First account of Hodgkin's Disease
- Fields: Pathologist

Signature
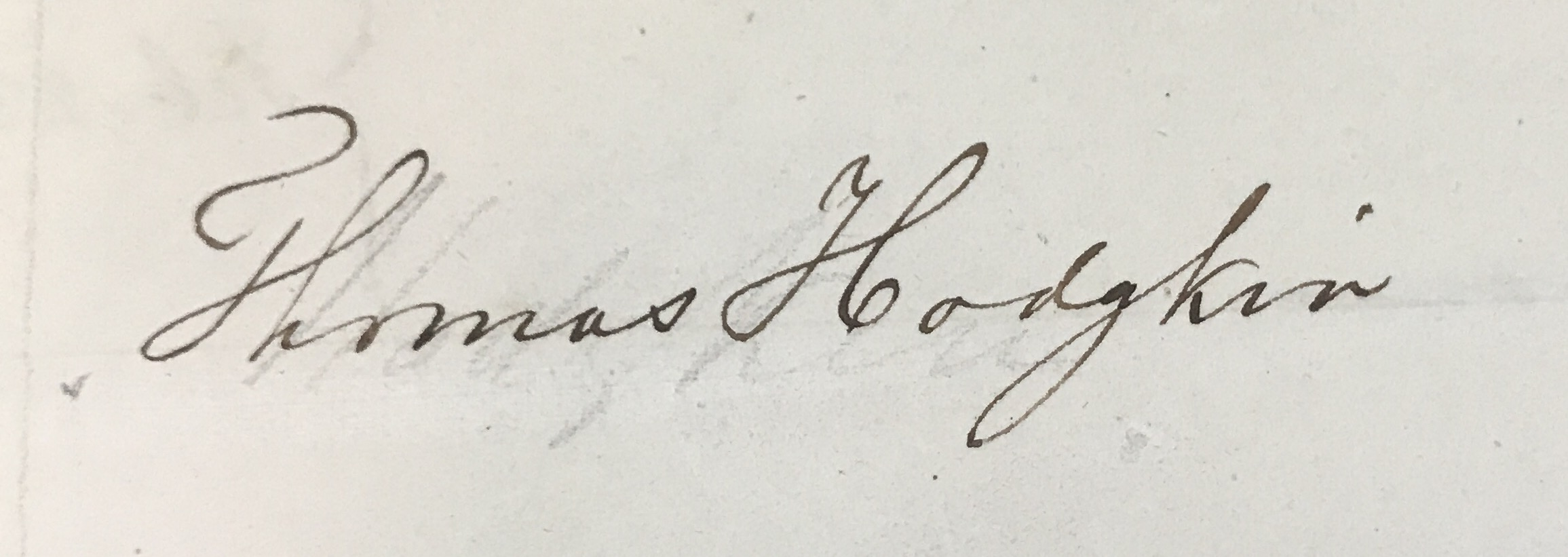

Thomas Hodgkin RMS (17 August 1798 – 5 April 1866) was an English physician, considered one of the most prominent pathologists of his time and a pioneer in preventive medicine. He is now best known for the first account of Hodgkin's disease, a form of lymphoma and blood disease, in 1832. Hodgkin's work marked the beginning of times when a pathologist was actively involved in the clinical process. He was a contemporary of Thomas Addison and Richard Bright at Guy's Hospital in London.

== Early life ==
Thomas Hodgkin was born to a Quaker family in Pentonville, St. James Parish, Middlesex, the son of John Hodgkin. He received private education with his brother John Hodgkin, and in 1816 took a position as private secretary to William Allen. His aim was to learn the trade of apothecary, one of the routes into medicine, and Allen, despite prominence in that business, did not make it possible. They parted, and Hodgkin went to an apothecary cousin, John Glaisyer, in Brighton instead. He inherited property from his great-uncle of the same name, meaning that from age 21 he had a degree of financial independence.

== Medical training and travel ==
In September 1819 Hodgkin was admitted to St Thomas's Hospital Medical School. He "walked the wards" for a year on the rounds of physicians and surgeons, and attended lectures, in particular those by Astley Cooper. He then studied at the University of Edinburgh, where the lecturers who impressed him included Andrew Duncan, the younger, and Robert Jameson in natural history. His first published paper, on the spleen, came from Duncan's course, and drew on the veterinary writings of his friend Bracy Clark. During his time as a student, he became a member of the Royal Medical Society.

In 1821, Hodgkin went to France, where he learned to work with the stethoscope, a recent invention of René Laennec. He also took account of the exacting statistical and clinical approach of Pierre Charles Alexandre Louis. He associated there with British expatriates including Robert Knox and Helen Maria Williams. In 1823, he qualified for his M.D. at the University of Edinburgh Medical School with a thesis on the physiological mechanisms of absorption in animals.

In Paris Hodgkin met Benjamin Thorpe, a banker for Rothschild's at the time, who was suffering from tuberculosis. Hodgkin became his physician for a while, and Thorpe was cured. This contact led to another appointment as physician to Abraham Montefiore, married to Henriette, daughter of Mayer Amschel Rothschild. Once graduated at Edinburgh, Hodgkin joined the couple for travel in Italy. Abraham was seriously ill with tuberculosis (he died in 1824) and the position proved unsatisfactory for both sides, with Hodgkin dismissed. But the relationship he built up with Moses Montefiore, Abraham's brother, proved a lifelong friendship.

Staying in Paris for an extended period from September 1824 to June 1825, Hodgkin made significant medical contacts. The Edwards brothers, William-Frédéric Edwards and Henri Milne Edwards, were both physiologists with distinctive theories, and Hodgkin looked over their work in the next few years. Achille-Louis Foville was a neurologist, around whom Hodgkin tried unsuccessfully, from 1838, to set up a southern version of the York Retreat.

== Career at Guy's ==
Hodgkin found a position at Guy's, first as a volunteer clerk in 1825, and then in 1826 as the curator of the museum there, also carrying out autopsies. He built up his reputation on the work his posts brought him in morbid anatomy (anatomical pathology as it is now called).

Hodgkin's hospital career came to an end, however, in 1837, when he clashed with the autocratic Benjamin Harrison. Harrison disliked Hodgkin's progressive views, and support for the new University College, London, and had been personally offended by them in one instance (see below). There were two confrontational interviews in which Harrison went over pretexts for not giving Hodgkin a promotion (to Assistant Physician); Hodgkin had also been ill not long before. His friends pushed the issue to an acrimonious vote of the governors, which was in fact hopeless. The position went to the rival candidate Benjamin Guy Babington, and Hodgkin moved reluctantly into private practice, after a period of convalescence. In 1840 he attended the World Anti-Slavery Convention in London representing the Aborigines Protection Society.

== Lecturer at St. Thomas' ==
Hodgkin had a further period of involvement with hospital medicine, when in 1842 he was asked to take charge of teaching at St. Thomas' Hospital. After joint management of Guy's and St. Thomas' had ended in 1825, St. Thomas' had found itself eclipsed as a medical school by its former partner. Hodgkin was brought in, and found new lecturers in Marshall Hall and George Gregory; he lectured himself, and with Charles Barker the four embarked on a lecture series. He also drew on his experience at Guy's to improve the museum and start a Clinical Society for reporting of cases. The outcome, however, was unsatisfactory for him. Hall was much preferred as lecturer, and Gregory, lecturing on skin diseases, gained a reputation for clarity, and wrote a textbook. But Hodgkin was not asked to continue lecturing for another year, ending the relationship.

== Last years ==
In around 1847, Hodgkin became guardian to an Aboriginal Australian youth, Warrulan, who had been brought to England in 1845 by Edward John Eyre, arranging for him to be educated at the Quaker Sibford School.

Hodgkin married in 1850 Sarah Frances Scaife, a widow; they had no children. When Lady Montefiore died in 1862, Hodgkin promised her to travel with her husband on future journeys. He accompanied Moses Montefiore to Palestine in 1866. There he contracted dysentery and died on 4 April 1866. He was buried in Jaffa.

== Interests ==
Hodgkin like many other Quakers was concerned both with the abolition of slavery and the reduction of the impact of western colonization on indigenous peoples around the world. He stood aside from the Anti-Slavery Society of the 1820s and 1830s, however; the society took a different line on emancipation and colonization in Africa. It refused in the early 1830s to publish his views. Hodgkin began to take multiple initiatives of his own.

=== Ethnology ===
Hodgkin had an interest in both the physical anthropology and the cultural aspects of what would now be ethnology, before the academic disciplines existed. In his role as keeper of the Museum at Guy's, he collected specimens from peoples from around the world. In 1827, in a letter supporting the missionary Hannah Kilham who was working with West African languages, he published for the first time long-held ideas on "civilisation"; a Civilization Society in London had been a Hodgkin family initiative some years earlier. In helping to found the Aborigines Protection Society, he argued that languages constituted philological evidence of man's origins, and should therefore be preserved where threatened; he had written a paper on the topic, and proposed a questionnaire, for the Philological Society in 1835.

For Hodgkin, language was a racial trait. In Paris around the end of 1838, he prevailed upon W. F. Edwards to form a French society with the same aims as the Aborigines Protection Society; and in 1839 the Société Ethnologique de Paris was set up in accordance with Edwards's own ideas. This development was reflected in 1843 when the Ethnological Society of London was set up, diverging from the Aborigines Protection Society by its scientific and linguistic interests, and disconnecting from missionary work.

=== Colonization in Africa ===
Hodgkin was a supporter of Liberia in the early days of its foundation; and he compared it favourably to Sierra Leone. In supporting Elliott Cresson and the American Colonization Society, he put himself outside the mainstream of Quaker and abolitionist thinking. When the American abolitionist, William Lloyd Garrison, toured in England in 1833, Hodgkin tried at first to mediate between Garrison and Cresson. The formation, however, of the British African Colonization Society by Cresson had Hodgkin's support, and he found himself isolated from natural allies who were Quakers or physicians. There were personal attacks on Hodgkin from the Garrison camp.

=== Hudson's Bay Company ===
Hodgkin became involved in campaigning concerning the Boothia Peninsula and the Hudson's Bay Company around 1836–37, through his friend Richard King. King had been on the expedition of Captain George Back in the north of Canada of 1833–35, and had written an 1836 book, his Narrative, on it; he advocated a further expedition in the same area in 1836–37, a cause Hodgkin took up. Sensitive commercial interests were involved, as the Hudson's Bay Company's license was due for renewal in 1841. The Narrative contained a piece Hodgkin had written on the indifference of the company to the indigenous peoples of western Canada. Hodgkin then took up the behaviour of the company with Benjamin Harrison, Treasurer of Guy's, disastrously mixing his professional life with his activism: Harrison was concerned in the management of the company as deputy chairman, and was related by marriage to John Henry Pelly, the chairman, who had crossed swords with King at parliamentary hearings.

Hodgkin's concerns over the indigenous peoples in the Hudson's Bay Company territory in western Canada continued. They were pursued both by correspondence with Sir George Simpson, and in the pages of the Intelligencer of the Aborigines Protection Society.

== Work in medicine ==
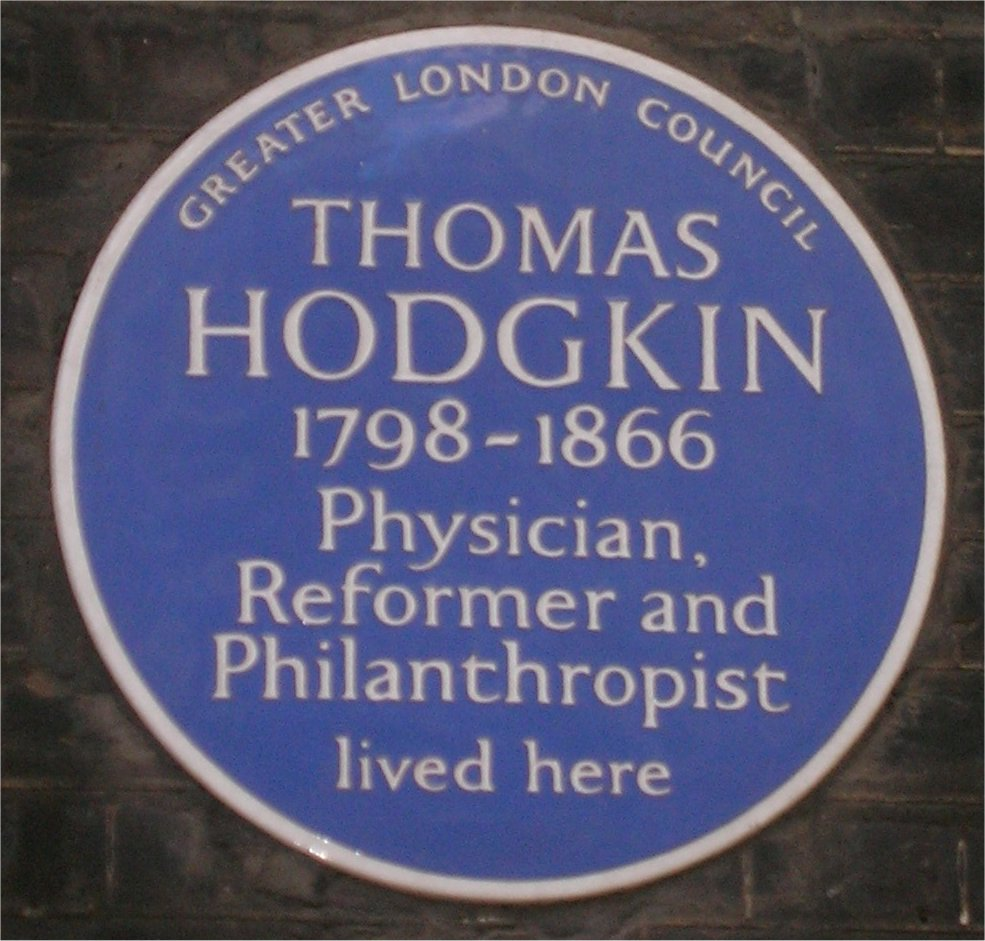
Blue plaque in Bedford Square, London

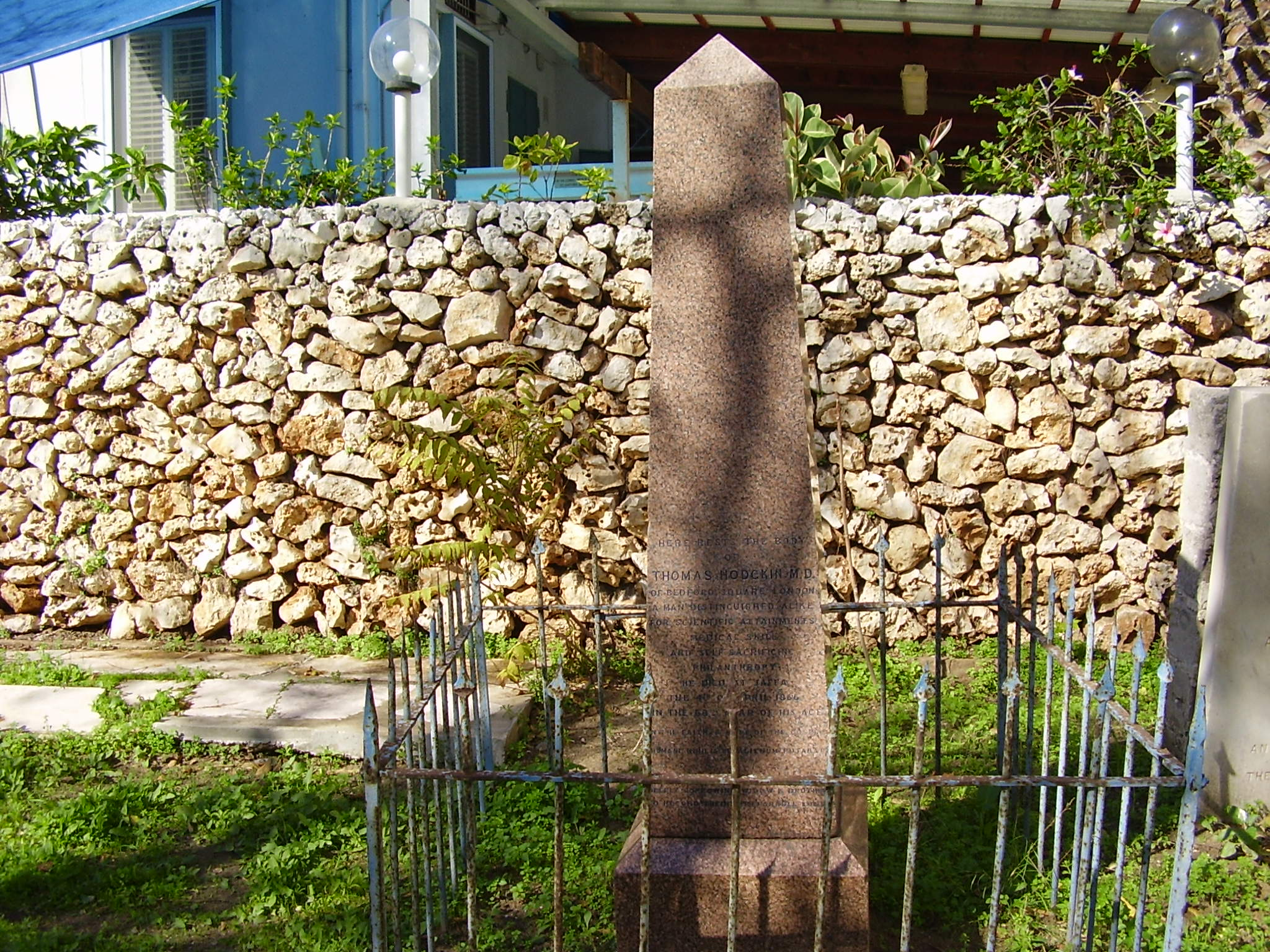
Tombstone of Thomas Hodgkin in Jaffa, Israel

Hodgkin collaborated with Joseph Jackson Lister, who in 1830 enunciated design principles for the achromatic microscope. By that time Hodgkin and Lister had already published research on tissue samples, based on observations made with Lister's innovative microscope, in particular on the "globule hypothesis" of the time which was held in particular by Henri Milne Edwards. They denied the existence of globules in tissue; Ernst Heinrich Weber in 1830 contradicted them, and the debate continued for a decade. For a while microscopy suffered in its reputation, but by 1840 histology was a recognised discipline, and in time the view of Hodgkin and Lister that "globules" were optical artefacts became accepted. The 1827 paper they published has been called "the foundation of modern histology".

Hodgkin described the disease that bears his name (Hodgkin lymphoma) in 1832, in a paper titled On Some Morbid Appearances of the Absorbent Glands and Spleen. He received 33 years later the eponym through the recognition of British physician Samuel Wilks, who rediscovered the disease. It is a malignancy that produces enlargement of lymphoid tissue, spleen, and liver, with invasion of other tissues. A more benign form is called Hodgkin's paragranuloma, while a more invasive form is called Hodgkin's sarcoma.

Hodgkin published as a book his Lectures on Morbid Anatomy in 1836 and 1840. His major contribution to the teaching of pathology, however, was made in 1829, with his two volumed work entitled The Morbid Anatomy of Serous and Mucous Membranes, which became a classic in modern pathology.

Hodgkin was one of the earliest defenders of preventive medicine, having published On the Means of Promoting and Preserving Health in book form in 1841. Among other early observations were the first description of acute appendicitis, of the biconcave format of red blood cells and the striation of muscle fibers.

Hodgkin also translated with Thomas Fisher, from the French of William-Frédéric Edwards, On the Influence of Physical Agents on Life (London, 1832; Philadelphia 1838). Edwards was a vitalist in physiology, who studied the effect of physical forces on processes in living organisms. The work as it appeared in English was much more than a translation, since it contained an appendix of over 200 pages containing two dozen papers, a compendium of medicine and science tangentially related to themes in Edwards, but related to his general approach. It included early work by Hodgkin and collaboration with Lister, as well as something on electricity and meteorology. He also published The Means of Promoting and Preserving Health (London, 1840), of which a second edition appeared in 1841, and an Address on Medical Reform (1847).

== Other works ==
Other works by Hodgkin were Biographical Sketches: of James Cowles Prichard (1849); and of William Stroud (1789–1858), a medical collaborator. He also wrote abolitionist pamphlets and on the British African Colonization Societies (1833–1834).

== Legacy ==
There is a blue plaque on his house in Bedford Square, London. The Friends' School, Hobart named one of the four school houses after him.

The King's College London School of Medicine's Hodgkin Building is named in honour of Hodgkin.
