= John Hunter (physician) =

Scottish physician and medical writer

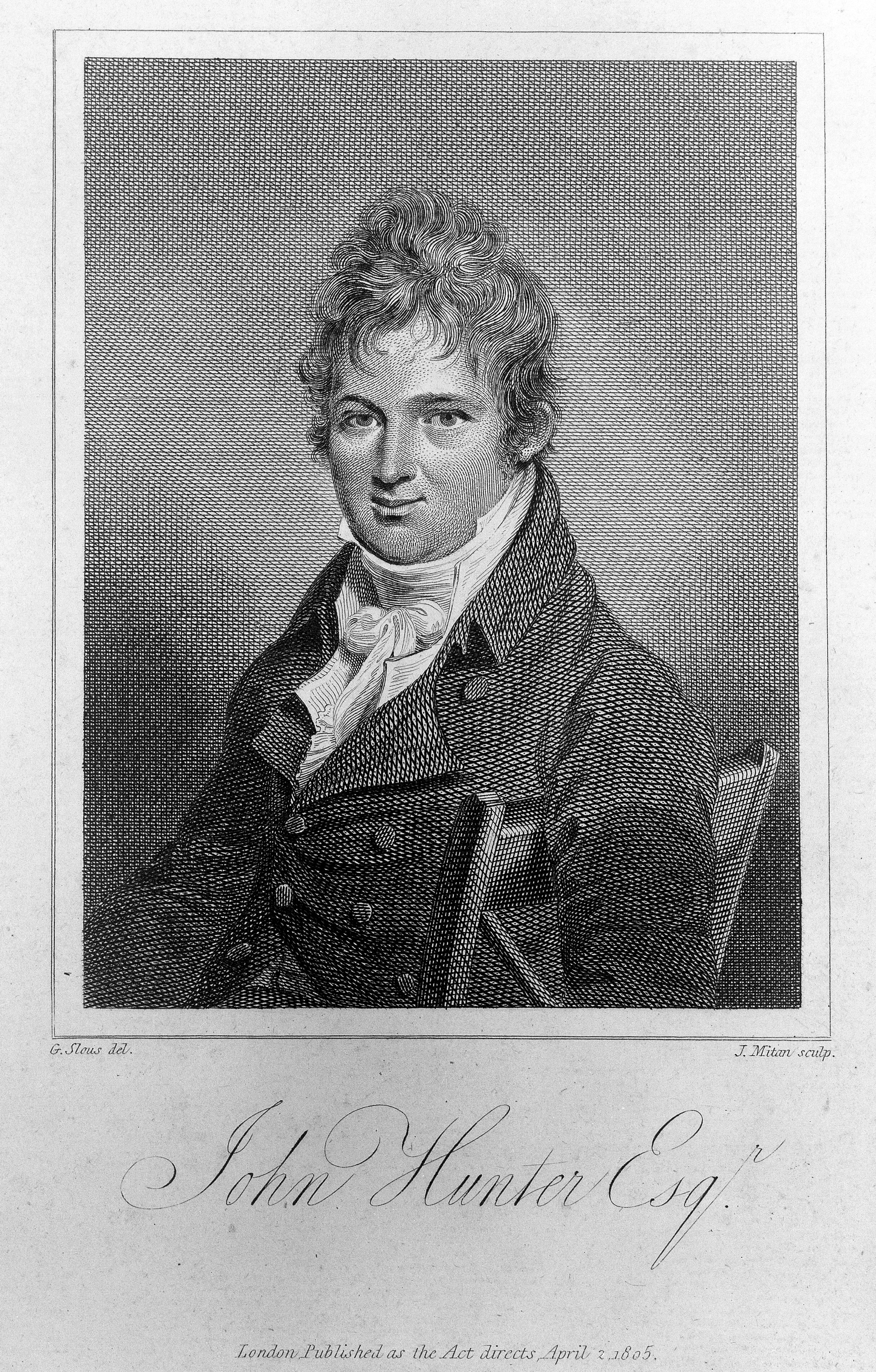
John Hunter

Dr John Hunter FRSE (1754–1809) was a Scottish physician linked to Jamaica.

== Life ==
John Hunter was born in Perthshire, and studied medicine at Edinburgh University, where he graduated M.D. in 1775. He was admitted a licentiate of the College of Physicians of London in 1777, and appointed physician to the army through the interest of George Baker and William Heberden.

From 1781 to 1783 Hunter was superintendent of the military hospitals in Jamaica. On returning to England he settled in practice as a physician in London, first in Charles Street, and then in Hill Street. Elected a fellow of the Royal Society by 1787, he was admitted a fellow of the College of Physicians speciali gratia in 1793, and was made censor the same year.

As Gulstonian lecturer in 1796, Hunter lectured on softening of the brain, which he is said to have been the first to treat as a distinct pathological condition; the lecture was not published. He was later physician extraordinary to the Prince of Wales.

Hunter died on 29 January 1809 at Hill Street, London.

== Works ==
Hunter's college dissertation De Hominum Varietatibus et harum causis (1775) was in the biological anthropology tradition. It was republished in an English translation by Thomas Bendyshe in 1865 with Johann Friedrich Blumenbach's treatises in the same area, in the publications of the Anthropological Society.

In 1787 Hunter contributed to the third volume of the Medical Transactions published by the College of Physicians three papers: one on the occurrence of typhus fever in the houses of the poor in London; another on morbid anatomy, and a third on the cause of the "dry belly-ache" of the tropics. In the last of these the discovery made by Baker two years earlier, that lead poisoning in cider was the cause of "Devonshire colic", was extended by Hunter to rum which had been distilled through a leaden worm, observations of Benjamin Franklin's being adduced in proof.

In 1788 appeared Hunter's major work, Observations on the Diseases of the Army in Jamaica (2nd ed. 1796; 3rd ed. 1808, with "observations on the hepatitis of the East Indies"). It gives an amplified account of the "dry belly-ache", and deals with yellow fever and other diseases of the troops, as well as more briefly with some other Caribbean maladies. It was translated into German, Leipzig, 1792.

Hunter contributed to the Philosophical Transactions in 1788 a paper on Jamaican wells and springs, a subject suggested by Henry Cavendish. He contributed to the first volume of Transactions of a Society for the Improvement of Medical and Chirurgical Knowledge, 1793, a memoir on canine madness, drawn up at the society's request, and another on hydatids.

== Family ==
Hunter married in 1784 Elizabeth LeGrand, daughter of Robert LeGrand.
