= Aborigines' Protection Society =

The Aborigines' Protection Society (APS) was an international human rights organisation founded in 1837, to ensure the health and well-being and the sovereign, legal and religious rights of the indigenous peoples while also promoting the civilisation of the indigenous people who were subjected under colonial powers, in particular the British Empire. In 1909 it merged with the British and Foreign Anti-Slavery Society (BFASS) to form the Anti-Slavery and Aborigines' Protection Society (now Anti-Slavery International).

The Society published a journal variously entitled Aborigines' Friend, or Colonial Intelligencer, and Colonial Intelligencer and Aborigines' Friend, often abbreviated to Aborigines' Friend, from 1855 until its merger with BFASS in 1909. when the journals of the two societies were merged.

== Foundation ==
The Quaker background and abolitionism were significant in the setting-up of the Society.

In 1835 Parliamentary MP Thomas Fowell Buxton set up a Parliamentary Select Committee to examine the effect of white settlement on indigenous peoples, and various other colonial issues. Though a non-Quaker himself, Buxton was the brother-in-law of Quaker reformer and philanthropist Elizabeth Fry. In 1837, British physician Thomas Hodgkin prompted the establishment of The Aborigines Committee at an annual Meeting for Sufferings of Quakers. In 1838 some of the findings of Buxton's committee were published as Information Respecting the Aborigines in the British Colonies. Hodgkin's brother John Hodgkin drafted it, then it was rewritten by Thomas to sharpen the effect and reduce its references to missionary activity.

Around the same time, The Aborigines' Protection Society (APS) was established, "to ensure the health and well-being and the sovereign, legal and religious rights of the indigenous peoples while also promoting the civilization of the indigenous people who were subjected under colonial powers". Other members brought experience from around the world: Saxe Bannister (Australia), Richard King (North America), John Philip (South Africa). The founders were, on King's account, Buxton, Hodgkin, William Allen, Henry Christy, Thomas Clarkson, and Joseph Sturge. Buxton, after the 1833 British abolition of slavery, had taken an interest in particular in the Cape Colony.

The Report of the APS in 1838 put the case that colonisation did not inevitably have detrimental effects on indigenous peoples, as conventional wisdom had it, even to the point of their extinction: if the effects were negative, that was a criticism of the plan and regulation for the colony.

== Activities ==
The Aborigines' Protection Society remained active for about 70 years. It operated in Australia, New Zealand, Fiji, Canada, South Africa and the Congo. Its motto was Ab Uno Sanguine, meaning "Of One Blood" (from Acts 17:26). Its focus was on equal rights, as Equality before the law, for indigenous people, although it did not extend to the protection and preservation of the cultures of these peoples. It aimed to achieve legislation that was not based on race, with "racial amalgamation". There was no commitment therefore to preserving the indigenous peoples as encountered.

In 1840 the Society reported on the treatment of indigenous peoples of Upper Canada.

The differing views of Buxton and Hodgkin on how to proceed caused some fundamental divisions in the early years. Hodgkin was interested in a forum for both scientific discussion (of early ethnology, a discipline that hardly yet existed separately from the study of language), and protective activities based on lobbying. Buxton shortly became caught up in the activist drive that led quickly to the Niger expedition of 1841, the failure of which was a huge personal blow and also drove missionary considerations into the background for a time. Hodgkin was unhappy with Buxton's published criticism of Elliott Cresson, and the general British disregard for Liberia as an abolitionist project. King issued a prospectus for the new Ethnological Society of London in 1842, following Hodgkin's view that the humanitarian and scientific objectives should from then on be pursued separately.

In 1842 the purpose of the APS was restated: "to record the history, and promote the advancement, of Uncivilized Tribes".

On Buxton's death in 1845, Samuel Gurney took over as President. Finances improved, and from 1847 Hodgkin had an assistant as Secretary on the payroll for a period, the activist Louis Alexis Chamerovzow. Chamerovzow published on the rights of Māori in 1848, and worked on Charles Dickens as opinion-former, with some success (as Dickens wrote to George Payne Rainsford James). He was a perceptive analyst of the difficulties in reconciling the interests of indigenous people and settlers.

Other campaigns included the case of a black man in the Cape Colony accused of stealing from a white man and punished by torture (1850), the use of bonded labour of black children in the Transvaal Republic (1880), and, later continued protesting the exploitation of indigenous South Africans during the time preceding the Second Boer War (1899–1902), which, they said, was often perpetrated under a "guise of philanthropy and Christianity".

In 1870 the APS bought Lennox Island (Prince Edward Island) on behalf of a community of the Mi'kmaq people.

== Publications ==
The Society published tracts, pamphlets, Annual Reports and a journal variously entitled The Aborigines' Friend, or, Colonial Intelligencer, Aborigines' Friend, or Colonial Intelligencer, Colonial Intelligencer and Aborigines' Friend, The Aborigines' Friend and the Colonial Intelligencer, also abbreviated to Aborigines' Friend, from 1855 until 1909.

Hodgkin's concerns over the indigenous peoples in the Hudson's Bay Company territory in western Canada were pursued both by correspondence with Sir George Simpson, and in the pages of the Intelligencer. In 1889 Henry Richard Fox Bourne became its editor, and took over as Chair of the APS. He was a critic of the Emin Pasha Relief Expedition, and used the Intelligencer to accuse it for the first time of "atrocities".

== Merger ==
The Society continued until 1909, when it merged with the British and Foreign Anti-Slavery Society to form the Anti-Slavery and Aborigines' Protection Society (now Anti-Slavery International).

== See also ==
- Aborigines' Rights Protection Society
- Henry Fox Bourne
