= Richard Stephen Charnock =

English lawyer, philologist and antiquary (1820–1905)

Richard Stephen Charnock (11 August 1820 – 2 March 1905) was an English lawyer, philologist, and antiquary (Ph.D., FSA, FRGS, FRSSA, FRSNA). He published several works on etymology, onomastics, and dialect, and contributed to the Oxford English Dictionary, as well as a number of journals, including Notes and Queries. His etymological work was received negatively both by his contemporaries, and in modern times.

== Biography ==
Born in London on 11 August 1820, the son of Richard Charnock, a barrister of the Inner Temple. His parents were cousins, and perhaps because of this, one of his siblings was "very weak"; another, who was disabled, became a skilled woodworker. His oldest sister was born around 1818. Charnock attended King's College London, but was probably articled to become a lawyer at the age of sixteen, which did not give him much time in formal education. As a result, he was largely self-taught, dedicating a great portion of his life to studying, concentrating on anthropology, archaeology, and philology, especially of "the Celtic and Oriental languages". In 1838 he was admitted as a reader of the British Museum library, and remains one of their earliest recorded readers.

Charnock was admitted an attorney in 1841, and his first office was at 44 Paternoster Row. By 1845 he had moved to 10 Godliman Street, and that year George Meredith was articled to him, but as Meredith said "He had neither business nor morals; and I had no stomach for the law, so I drifted into journalism". Charnock later inspired characters in Meredith's novel The Ordeal of Richard Feverel (1859), especially "Hippias Feverel, the dyspeptic wine-bibber and author of scholarly treatises". Meredith's friend Lionel Robinson described Charnock to Edward Clodd as "a 'character', a real antiquarian of doubtful morals and for many years one of the 'old boys' of the Arundel Club of Bohemian ways and days. Meredith put him (much disguised) into Richard Feverel as the uncle", while the Dictionary of National Biography said Charnock "is thought to have combined certain of the traits of the two uncles in Richard Feverel".

Charnock later moved to 8 Gray's Inn Square, where he lived for a long time. He travelled extensively, including "through the whole of Europe", as well as visiting North Africa and Asia Minor. Charnock wrote the Illustrated Hand-Book to Spain and Portugal in 1865, part of the Bradshaw's Guide series, and he continued to edit the book each year until its 35th and final edition in 1899. According to professor Kirsty Hooper: "While Charnock's input remained largely invisible, since, in line with Bradshaw's house style, the Illustrated Handbook focused on practical details, we can glimpse his personality in the extensive vocabulary section, which provides travellers with such indispensable expressions as 'El gato escaldado del agua frio huye' ('A burnt child dreads the fire') and 'Al signo del Caballo Blanco' ('At the sign of the White Horse')."

In 1870 he was admitted as a member of Gray's Inn, the following year was elected president of the Anthropological Society of London (as well as being the treasurer of the associated Cannibal Club), and by 1875 had become the president of the breakaway London Anthropological Society. He was a fellow of the Society of Antiquaries, Philological Society, Royal Asiatic Society, and Royal Geographical Society, a member of the Royal Nordic Society of Antiquaries, corresponding member of the New England Historic Genealogical Society, honorary member of the Society of Anthropology of Paris, and was awarded a Doctor of Philosophy degree by the University of Göttingen. He ceased practicing as solicitor in 1879.

He also contributed to a number of publications. Charnock was a reader for the Oxford English Dictionary, where he was credited with 1,200 quotations. He edited the London Anthropological Society's journal Anthropologia (1874–1876), and wrote papers for The Journal of the Anthropological Institute, and the Transactions of the Philological Society. Charnock wrote articles for Meredith's Monthly Observer magazine under the name Aretched Kooseg ('Wretched Quiz'). He contributed to Notes and Queries for almost half a century, from at least 1856 to 1902.

Charnock had been unwell for several years before his death on 2 March 1905, and his obituary described him as living "a lonely life in the obscure lodging in which he died. ... He passed away peacefully, unnoticed and unknown, in the house in which he had lodged for some years, No. 30, Millman Street, attended to by strangers. For their long attention he has left them a handsome legacy, and relatives and friends are not forgotten among the numerous legacies he left, his property being about 10,000l. in value. Notwithstanding his legal education, in his desire to be generous, the legacies in his will are for a larger amount than he had to give, though he frequently made fresh wills, the last being dated in 1898."

== Assessment of etymological work ==
Contemporary views of Charnock's etymological and onomastic books were largely negative. For example, Joseph Knight, the editor of Notes and Queries wrote: "We knew Charnock during many years, and found him reticent. His contributions were generally short, but their occasional appearances provoked serious remonstrances from philologists."

Modern assessments are similarly damning. A 1969 review in RQ described Ludus Patronymicus as "An analytical dictionary of 4,000 names which have been slurred by ignorance or time into seemingly unrelated forms. A vague item which appears to be more novelty than scholarly. Not recommended." Leslie Dunkling wrote: "It is necessary to say that an awful lot of nonsense about surname origins has appeared in print, and one must not innocently believe everything one reads. To give just one example, Richard Stephen Charnock, in a book entitled Ludus Patronymicus, or the Etymology of Curious Surnames, seriously explains the name Shakespeare as a corruption of Jacques Pierre. This carries the 'game of names' a little too far."

== Books ==
- Guide to the Tyrol: Comprising Pedestrian Tours Made in Tyrol, Styria, Carinthia, and Salzkammergut, during the Summers of 1852 and 1853 together with a Skeleton Map of the Country (1857)
- Local Etymology: A Derivative Dictionary of Geographical Names (1859)
- Memoir of the Charnock Family (1861)
- Bradshaw's Illustrated Hand-Book to Spain and Portugal: A Complete Guide for Travellers in the Peninsula, with Maps, Town Plans, and Steel Illustrations (1865–1899)
- Verba Nominalia; or, Words Derived from Proper Names (1866)
- Ludus Patronymicus; or, the Etymology of Curious Surnames (1868)
- On Ancient Manorial Customs, Tenures, Services, Privileges, Serjeanties, Grants, Fines, etc., in the County of Essex (1870)
- Patronymica Cornu-Britannica; or, the Etymology of Cornish Surnames (1870)
- The Peoples of Transylvania (1870)
- Anthropologia; in which are Included the Proceedings of the London Anthropological Society (1874–1876)
- A Glossary of the Essex Dialect (1880)
- On the Etymology of Beccles (1880)
- Prænomina; or, The Etymology of the Principal Christian Names of Great Britain and Ireland (1882)
- Nuces Etymologicaæ (1889)
