= George Edward Roberts =

English geologist and autho

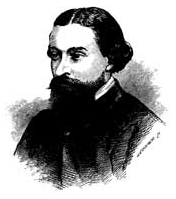
- Born: 1831; Birmingham, England
- Died: 20 December 1865 (aged 33–34); Kidderminster, England
- Occupations: Geologist and author

George Edward Roberts (1831 – 20 December 1865) was an English geologist and author.

== Biography ==
Roberts was born at Birmingham in 1831, and brought up at Kidderminster. His family owned a draper's business in Bull Ring, Birmingham, for over 50 years. Roberts early manifested an interest in natural science, devoting himself especially to the geology of Worcestershire, Herefordshire, and the adjacent parts of Wales. He wrote sundry small books—some dealing with the physical and geological features of this region, the most important being "The Rocks of Worcestershire" (1860); others, for children, blending the acids of science with the sweets of imagination. As part of his more serious work, he contributed two papers to the "Quarterly Journal of the Geological Society of London," and was joint author of two others. The Royal Society's "Catalogue" gives a list of seventeen others contributed to the "Geologist," the "Geological Magazine," the "Anthropological Review," &c. Roberts also wrote for the "Reader," the "Intellectual Observer," and other papers. For the last five years of his life he was clerk to the Geological Society of London, was elected a fellow of that society in 1864, and honorary secretary to the Anthropological Society in the same year. He died rather suddenly at Kidderminster, 20 December 1865.
