= John Richard de Capel Wise =

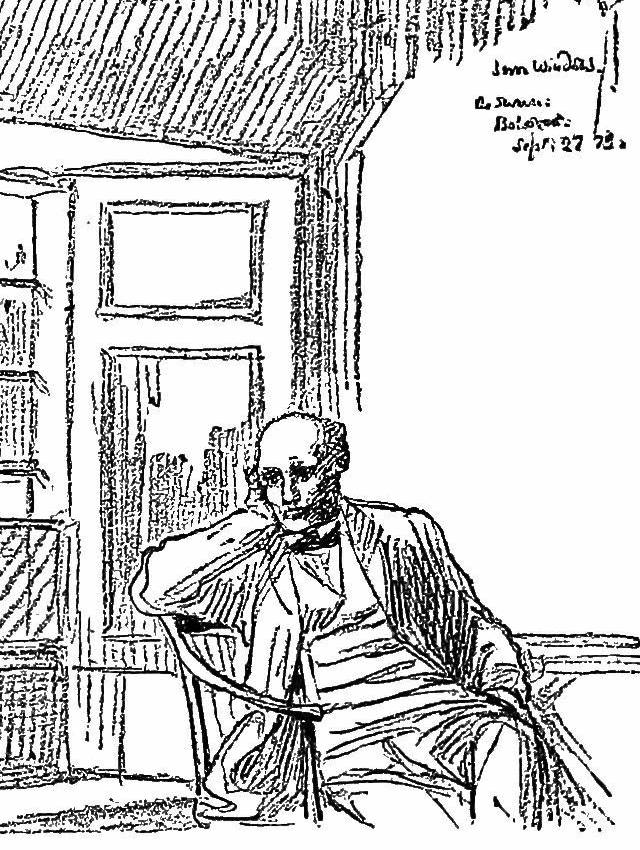
- John Wise sketched by Walter Crane, 27 September 1879
- Born: 1831
- Died: 1890 (aged 58–59); Lyndhurst
- Writing career
- Literary movement: Picturesque

John Richard de Capel Wise (1831–1 April 1890) was a writer and natural historian. Although he wrote on Shakespeare and other subjects, his most successful work was his 1862 book The New Forest: its History and its Scenery, which describes the scenery, the natural history, the antiquities, and the dialect of the New Forest, in Hampshire, England.

== Life ==
Wise was born in 1831, and was the eldest son of John Robert Wise (a former British consul-general in Sweden) and his wife Jane. He attended Grantham Grammar School, and then in 1849 enrolled at Lincoln College, Oxford. He took no degree, and left the university to travel abroad. On returning to England he wandered through country districts, frequently changing his residence.

Wise held radical views on religion and politics. According to his friend, Walter Crane, Wise was intended for the Church, but he left Oxford and quarrelled with his parents "on account of his free opinions." He came to know John Chapman, editor of the Westminster Review. For many years he wrote the section on Belles-Lettres in that magazine, but withdrew suddenly owing to political differences with Chapman. His relations with the Westminster Review brought him the acquaintance of George Henry Lewes and George Eliot. Subsequently he was a contributor to The Reader, a weekly periodical which also advocated advanced views. He was a correspondent for a London paper during the Franco-Prussian War in 1870.

Wise never married. He was resident in the New Forest in the early 1860s, which allowed him to research and write his book on the locality, but by the summer of 1863 he was residing in lodgings near Hathersage in the Peak District. He hoped to write a book on the Peak District, similar to the one he had written for the New Forest, but did not receive sufficient encouragement to go on with the work. By 1875 he was settled at Sandsend, near Whitby. Some years later he had relocated to Edwinstowe, Nottinghamshire. He visited Lyndhurst in the New Forest in August 1889, and being in a weak state of health he remained there through the winter. He died on 1 April 1890, aged 59, and was buried in Lyndhurst cemetery.

== Writings ==
His first work was a pamphlet of poems called Robin Hood published in 1855. In 1860 he issued a novel in two volumes called The Cousins' Courtship with little success. Following repeated visits to Stratford-upon-Avon he published (1861) a volume on Shakspere: his Birthplace and its Neighbourhood. The book contained a description of the local scenery, the natural history, the literary associations and dialect of Stratford-on-Avon.

In 1862 he published The New Forest: its History and its Scenery. The book contained sixty-two illustrations drawn by Walter Crane and engraved by William James Linton. Wise walked through the district with Walter Crane selecting the views to illustrate. This would prove to be Wise's most successful book, and it went through five editions up to 1895. The most sought after edition by collectors was the "artist's edition" of 1883, to which Heywood Sumner added twelve etchings, and which had Linton's woodcuts mounted on India paper.

In 1881 he anonymously published an elaborate volume called The First of May: a Fairy Masque, which he dedicated to Charles Darwin. The text, a collection of lyrics from Wise's pen, was illustrated with fifty-two pictures by Walter Crane. The book was financially unsuccessful.

=== List of works ===
- Robin Hood, and other poems (1855)
- The Beauties of Shakespeare: a lecture (1857)
- The Cousins' Courtship (1860)
- Shakspere: his Birthplace and its Neighbourhood (1861)
- The New Forest: its History and its Scenery (1863)
- The First of May: a Fairy Masque (1881)
