= Ethnological Society of London =

Learned society founded in 1843

The Ethnological Society of London (ESL) was a learned society founded in 1843 as an offshoot of the Aborigines' Protection Society (APS). The meaning of ethnology as a discipline was not then fixed: approaches and attitudes to it changed over its lifetime, with the rise of a more scientific approach to human diversity. Over three decades the ESL had a chequered existence, with periods of low activity and a major schism contributing to a patchy continuity of its meetings and publications. It provided a forum for discussion of what would now be classed as pioneering scientific anthropology from the changing perspectives of the period, though also with wider geographical, archaeological and linguistic interests.

In 1871 the ESL became part of what now is the Royal Anthropological Institute of Great Britain and Ireland, merging back with the breakaway rival group the Anthropological Society of London.

== Background ==
At the time of the Society's foundation, "ethnology" was a neologism. The Société Ethnologique de Paris was founded in 1839, and the Ethnological Society of New York was founded in 1842. An earlier Anthropological Society of London existed from 1837 to 1842; Luke Burke who was a member published an Ethnological Journal in 1848.

The Paris society was set up by William Frederic Edwards, with a definite research programme in mind. Edwards had been lecturing for a decade on the deficiency of considering the races as purely linguistic groups. The Oxford English Dictionary records the term "ethnology" used in English by James Cowles Prichard in 1842, in his Natural History of Man, for the "history of nations". The approach to ethnology current at the time of the Society's founding relied on climate and social factors to explain human diversity; the debate was still framed by Noah's Flood, and the corresponding monogenism of human origins. Prichard was a major figure in looking at human variability from a diachronic angle, and argued for ethnology as such a study, aimed at resolving the question of human origins.

The early days of ethnology saw it in the position of a fringe science. Prichard commented in 1848 that the British Association for the Advancement of Science (BAAS) still classed ethnology as a subdivision of natural history, as applied to man. It stayed in Section D for a period, but in 1851 it was classed in a new Section E for Geology and Geography, after lobbying by supporters including Roderick Murchison. The overlap of interests between the ESL and the Royal Geographical Society (RGS) was reflected by common membership.

Around 1860 the discovery of human antiquity and the publication of the Origin of Species caused a fundamental change of perspective, with the older historical approach looking hopeless given the emergence of prehistory, but the biological issue gaining in interest.

== Tensions in the Aborigines' Protection Society ==
The Aborigines' Protection Society (APS) was set up as a result of parliamentary committee activity, and was largely the initiative of Thomas Fowell Buxton. It produced reports, but in the wake of the Niger expedition of 1841 some of its supporters believed a case made on science was being sidelined in the activities of the APS. The APS was founded by Quakers in order to promote a specific social and political agenda. The Ethnological Society, though primarily a scientific organization, retained some of its predecessor's liberal outlook and activist bent.

== Foundation ==
An ethnological questionnaire was produced by the BAAS in 1841, arising from a committee led by Thomas Hodgkin of the APS, and drawing on prior work in Paris by W. F. Edwards. A prospectus for the Ethnological Society was issued in July 1842 by Richard King; King had been a student under Hodgkin at Guy's Hospital. The Society first met in February 1843 at Hodgkin's house; or on 31 January, when Ernst Dieffenbach read a paper On the Study of Ethnology.

Among the other founders were James Cowles Prichard, John Beddoe and John Brown. Apart from Hodgkin, King and Dieffenbach, the other significant common member with the APS was William Aldam, another Quaker. The Society had Corresponding Members, who counted as Fellows; they later included Hermann Welcker. In the early days the Society had rooms at 27 Sackville Street, which were rented through King to the Westminster Medical Society.

== 1840s ==
John Briggs became a Fellow of the ESL in 1845, and Brian Houghton Hodgson, also representing the ethnology of India, was at some point made an Honorary Fellow. William Augustus Miles was a member and published a paper on the aboriginal Australian culture.

After Prichard's death in 1848, the intellectual leader in the Society became Robert Gordon Latham. Links to the Aborigines' Protection Society were retained through the common membership of Hodgkin and Henry Christy, though the break was not completely amicable. The Ethnological Society in its early years lacked good contacts with officialdom, certainly compared to the RGS and its good working relationship with the Colonial Office. Governor George Grey was helpful to the Society, but he was an exception: it took until the end of the decade for the Society to begin to appreciate its marginal position with respect to the flow of information from the British colonies. Grey was an active member of the ESL while abroad as a colonial administrator, and his network included William Ellis, another member.

== 1850s ==
In 1850 the Society was based at 17 Savile Row. It saw a period of decline in the middle of the decade. Among active members on the Council was William Devonshire Saull, who died in 1855. George Bellas Greenough was a vice-president. Richard Cull's 1852 report mentioned Singapore connections, in particular James Richardson Logan.

Thomas Richard Heywood Thomson delivered a paper in 1854 to the Society on interfertility, casting doubt on comments of Paweł Edmund Strzelecki about female infertility among Aboriginal Australians after they had given birth to a child with a white father. The communication was well received, but as a contribution to the ongoing debate on race, was far from settling the significant underlying issue.

James Hunt joined the ESL in 1854, and became a divisive figure because of his attacks on humanitarian attitudes of missionaries and abolitionists. He served as secretary from 1859 to 1862. He found an ally in John Crawfurd, who had retired from service as colonial diplomat and administrator for the East India Company. Crawfurd came to ethnology through its section in the BAAS. His published views on race were discordant with the Quaker and APS tradition in the ESL. Hunt and Crawfurd in 1858 tried to dislodge the President Sir James Clark at an ESL meeting, unsuccessfully, while Hodgkin was out of the country.

== 1860s ==
The 1860s saw a revived interest in ethnology, triggered by recent work, such as that involving flint implements and the antiquity of man. The Ethnological Society became a more of meeting-place for archaeologists, as its interests kept pace with new work; and during this decade the Society became a very different institution. The society's original members had mainly been military officers, civil servants, and members of the clergy, but by the early 1860s younger scientists had supplanted them. The background was of continuing encounters worldwide with many peoples; John Thomson the photographer who was recording them became a member in 1866. Thomas Henry Huxley, Augustus Lane Fox, Edward Tylor, Henry Christy, John Lubbock, and Augustus Wollaston Franks all figured prominently in the society's affairs after 1860.

The ESL's meetings and journal served as a forum for sharing new ideas, and as a clearing-house for ethnological data. In 1868 the Society set up a Classification Committee to try to get on top of the issues caused by haphazard reporting, and lack of systematic fieldwork. This initiative was a proposal of Lane Fox.

== Split and merger ==
In the years after the publication of the Origin of Species in 1859, the "Ethnologicals" generally supported Charles Darwin against his critics, and rejected the more extreme forms of scientific racism. The movement towards Darwinism was not one way, however, as evidenced by the Honorary Fellowship given to Robert Knox in 1860.

The Anthropological Society of London (ASL) was founded in 1863 as an institutional home for those who disagreed with the Ethnological Society's politics (in terms of party loyalties, Stocking makes the political complexion of the ESL 75% Liberal to 25% Conservative, with the proportions reversed in the ASL). On the topic of race, the Ethnological Society retained views descending from Johann Friedrich Blumenbach, who had a five-race theory but was a monogenist, and from Prichard. The post-Darwin concept of human speciation was unacceptable to those forming the Anthropological Society.

The two societies co-existed warily for several years. The X Club, with members in common, supported the Ethnological Society's side of the debate. Both societies took an interest in sexual morality as a topic, but the attitude of social evolutionism was very largely restricted to the Ethnological Society, where John Ferguson McLennan was a member, with the exception of Charles Staniland Wake who made little impact at the time. Huxley made efforts to merge the societies in 1866, but was blocked by Crawfurd; the attempt was renewed in 1868 after Crawfurd's death. The Ethnological Society and Anthropological Society merged in 1871 into the Anthropological Institute. A small group of past supporters of Hunt broke away in 1873, forming a London Anthropological Society that lasted two years.

== Publications ==
Initially the Ethnological Society did not aim to publish its own learned journal. Instead it adopted a suggestion of Robert Jameson, who edited the Edinburgh New Philosophical Journal, to have its transactions published there. The early flow of published papers was in fact sparse. Volume 46 from 1848 contained papers by George Ruxton and James Henry Skene contributed via the Ethnological Society.

The Journal of the Ethnological Society of London was published in the years 1848 to 1856, a period in which four volumes appeared, and the Society's scientific activities were less marginal. It was edited by Thomas Wright. It then was published once more, under the title Transactions of the Ethnological Society of London, from 1861 to 1869; it was renamed and published, from 1869 to 1870, again as Journal of the Ethnological Society of London, and was edited by George Busk.

== Presidents ==
- 1843 Charles Malcolm
- 1848 James Cowles Prichard
- 1850 Charles Malcolm.
- 1853–54 Sir Benjamin Collins Brodie, 1st Baronet
- 1855–56 John Conolly
- Sir James Clark
- 1861–? John Crawfurd
- 1863–65 John Lubbock
- 1865–68 John Crawfurd
- 1868–69 Thomas Huxley
- Before merger: George Busk
