= Thomas Hunt (speech therapist) =

Thomas Perkins Lowman Hunt (1802 in Whitchurch, Dorset – 18 August 1851 in Godlingstone near Swanage) was an English speech therapist, inventor of a method claiming to cure stammering.

== Early life ==
Hunt was born in Dorset in 1802. His leisure was spent in Dorset, where he cultivated land, and made agricultural improvements and experiments. He is said to have been educated at Winchester, Hampshire; and to have entered Trinity College, Cambridge in 1822, with the intention of becoming a minister of the church of England. The experience of a fellow-collegian who stammered is said to have arrested his attention, and he left Cambridge without taking a degree in order to devote himself to the study and cure of what he called 'defective utterance'.

== Speech Therapist ==
=== 1827 ===
He found that the lips, the tongue, the jaws, and the breath were in different cases the offending members. Thinking that he was able to cure stammering, he sought wider experience in a provincial tour, and finally in 1827 settled in Regent Street, London. He relied on simple common-sense directions. Each case was studied separately. Sometimes slow and sometimes rapid articulation was recommended to his patients, others were taught to place their tongues in particular positions, and others practised improved means of breathing. He held that not one case in fifty was the consequence of malorganisation, and objected to surgical operations. At an early date, 1828, he was patronised by Sir John Forbes, M.D., F.R.S., who sent him pupils for twenty-four years.

=== 1842 ===
Hunt's approach was significant in relation to Hunt's intervention, on behalf of George Pearson, the chief witness in the case respecting the assassination attempt upon Queen Victoria made by John Francis on 30 May 1842:

George Pearson, aged 16, was the chief witness in the case of the attempt made on the life of the pregnant Queen Victoria on 30 May 1842 by John Francis, aged 20, who had tried to shoot her whilst she was driving down Constitution Hill.
Francis had been only a few yards from her carriage; and so had Pearson.
Not only was Pearson unable to give evidence, but, at the time of Francis’ attempt, he "[had been] afflicted with so inveterate a habit of stammering as to be unable even to give an alarm [to the Queen]" (Anon, 25 June 1842).
When he was presented to the magistrate, Sir Peter Laurie (1778-1861), a former Lord Mayor of London, [who stated] what he had observed — to justify the entrapment of Francis in the same location a day later — in Laurie’s words "[Pearson’s] infirmity was of such a nature as to render him perfectly incapable of giving utterance to his meaning. Mr. Hunt kindly offered his services to Pearson, and in a fortnight I saw him again, when he spoke with the utmost readiness, and I believe the cure to be complete" (Hunt, 1854, p.31).
Francis was found guilty of treason. On 1 July 1842, by the personal order of Queen Victoria, his death sentence was commuted to transportation for life to Van Diemen's Land. He Left England on 15 July 1842, on the Marquis of Hastings. — (Yeates, 2013, p.798).

=== 1846 ===
The Lancet — which consistently held that "the treatment and cure of stammering belong to the profession of medicine" — of 16 May 1846, made a severe attack on Hunt as an unlicensed practitioner. Hunt replied in the Literary Gazette of 30 May 1846.

=== 1849 ===
In 1849 his numerous pupils, belonging to all professions, in commemoration of his twenty-two years' service, subscribed for his bust in marble, which was modelled by Joseph Durham, and exhibited in the Royal Academy.

== Death ==
He died at Godlingstone, near Swanage, Dorset, on 18 Aug. 1851, leaving his practice to his son James Hunt. His widow, Mary, died 25 Jan. 1855, aged 49.
