= Henry Fox Bourne =

British social reformer and writer

- Born: 24 December 1837; Blue Mountains, Jamaica
- Died: 2 February 1909 (aged 71); Torquay, England
- Education: University of London
- Occupations: Essayist, journalist
- Spouse: Emma Deane Bleckly (m. 1862)
- Children: 3
- Writing career
- Language: English
- Period: 1855–1908

Henry Richard Fox Bourne (24 December 1837 – 2 February 1909) was a British social reformer and writer.

== Early life ==
Henry Fox Bourne was born at Grecian Regale, Blue Mountains, Jamaica, on 24 December 1837, one of eight children of Stephen Bourne, magistrate and advocate of the abolition of slavery, and of Elizabeth Quirk. His father had founded in December 1826 the World, the first nonconformist and exclusively religious journal in England. His parents left Jamaica in 1841 for British Guiana, and moved to London in 1848. There, after attending a private school, Fox Bourne entered London University in 1856, and joined classes at King's College London and the City of London College. He also attended, at University College London, lectures on English literature and history by Henry Morley, whose intimate friend and assistant he afterwards became. In 1855 he entered the war office as a clerk, devoting his leisure to literary and journalistic work. He regularly contributed to The Examiner an organ of advanced radical thought, of which Henry Morley was editor, and wrote for Charles Dickens in Household Words.

== Writer ==
In 1862 Fox Bourne made some reputation by his first independently published work, A Memoir of Sir Philip Sidney, which showed painstaking research and critical insight, and remains a standard biography. There followed English Merchants (1866); Famous London Merchants (1869), written for younger readers; The Romance of Trade (1871); English Seamen under the Tudors (1868), and The Story of Our Colonies (1869). In these books Fox Bourne traced in a popular style the rise of England's commerce and colonial expansion. In 1870 Fox Bourne retired from the war office, and with the money granted him in lieu of a pension purchased the copyright and control of The Examiner. Although John Stuart Mill, Herbert Spencer, and Frederic Harrison were still among the contributors, the paper proved in Bourne's hands a financial failure, and he disposed of it in 1873 (see F. Harrison's Reminiscences, 1911).

The next two years he mainly spent on a Life of John Locke, which he published in 1876. From 1876 to 1887 he was editor of the Weekly Dispatch which under his auspices well maintained its radical independence. Fox Bourne freely criticised the Gladstonian administration of 1880-5, and his hostility to Gladstone's home rule bill of 1886 led to his retirement from the editorship.

== Aborigines Protection Society ==
Fox Bourne became secretary of the Aborigines Protection Society (APS) on 4 January 1889. He edited its journal, the Aborigines' Friend, and pressed on public attention the need of protecting native races, especially in Africa. One of the first to denounce publicly the cruel treatment of natives in the Congo Free State in 1890, he used all efforts to secure the enforcement of the provisions of the Brussels Convention of 1890 for the protection of the natives in Central Africa. He forcibly stated his views in The Other Side of the Emin Pasha Expedition (1891) and in Civilisation in Congo Land (1903). To his advocacy was largely due the ultimate improvement in native conditions in the Belgian Congo.

At first, the APS, like the Anti-Slavery Society with which it merged in 1909, supported the work of British chartered companies, and believed that nurturing legitimate and more profitable trade would eliminate slave trafficking. By 1894, the APS retracted its support, protesting against the violence in Mashonaland in 1893 that resulted from the war which the British South Africa Company had entered into with the Matabele under Lobengula. The APS, in contrast with the Anti-Slavery Society, disapproved of the policy of allowing chartered companies to govern colonies, sensing a conflict of interest between maintaining justice and extracting maximum profit. In 1900, Fox Bourne expressed in a policy statement entitled The Claims of Uncivilised Races that the native had three fundamental rights: to his land, to his rites and institutions, and to an equal share of profits arising from colonisation. These rights should not be taken without his understanding and approval. Colonisation should be for the 'moral advantage' of the colonised more than for the 'material advantage' of the colonising power.

Although he failed in his attempts to secure the franchise for natives in the Transvaal and Orange River colonies in 1906, his strong protests against the slave traffic in Angola and the cocoa-growing islands of São Tomé and Príncipe compelled the Portuguese government to admit the necessity of reform. In a series of six pamphlets (1906–8) on Egyptian affairs he denounced alleged abuses which took place during the British occupation, and advocated Egyptian self-government. Fox Bourne's pertinacious patience in investigation and his clearness of exposition gave his views on native questions wide influence.

== Death ==
Fox Bourne died suddenly at Torquay, from bronchitis contracted on his holiday, on 2 February 1909, and was cremated at Woking. A memorial service was held at Araromi chapel, Lagos. He married on 1 May 1862 Emma Deane, daughter of Henry Bleckly, a Warrington ironmaster. His widow, with two sons and a daughter, survived him.

Besides the works mentioned, Fox Bourne published: 1. (with the Earl of Dundonald) Life of Thomas, Lord Cochrane, 1869. 2. Foreign Rivalries in Industrial Products, 1877. 3. English Newspapers, 2 vols. 1887, a serviceable chronicle of journalistic history. 4. The Aborigines Protection Society; Chapters in its History, 1899.
