= John Brown (geographer) =

British geographer (1797–1861)

John Brown

John Brown (2 August 1797 – 7 February 1861) was a geographer, and was particularly interested in Franklin's lost expedition.

== Life ==
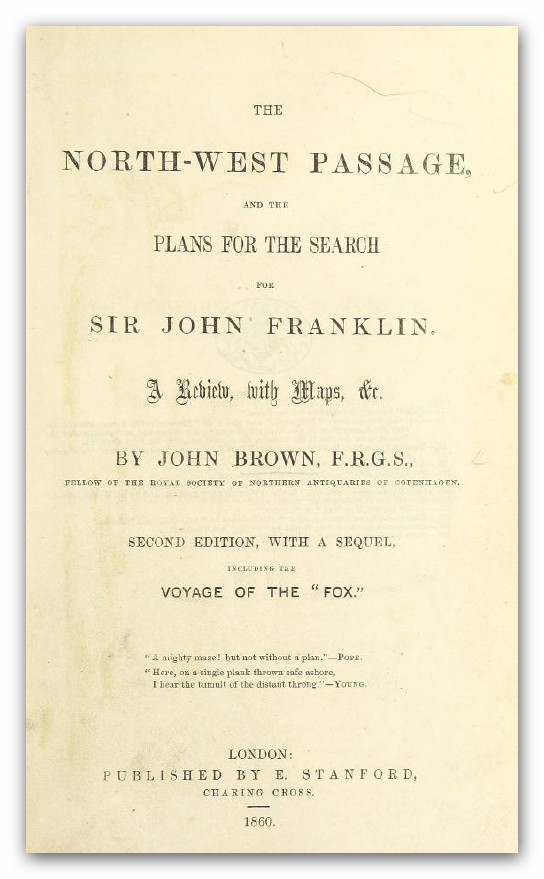
The title page of John Brown's book

Brown was born in Dover in 1797, and served for some time as a midshipman in the East India Company's service. In March 1819 he was forced to leave the sea because of poor eyesight. He went on to become a diamond merchant and made a fortune.

He took a keen interest in geographical exploration, and became a fellow of the Geographical Society in 1837. He presented a portrait of his friend James Weddell (the explorer of the Antarctic) to the society in 1839, with a letter advocating further expeditions. In 1843 Brown obtained a pension for Weddell's widow from Sir Robert Peel. He was a founder of the Ethnological Society of London in the same year.

== Interest in John Franklin's lost expedition ==
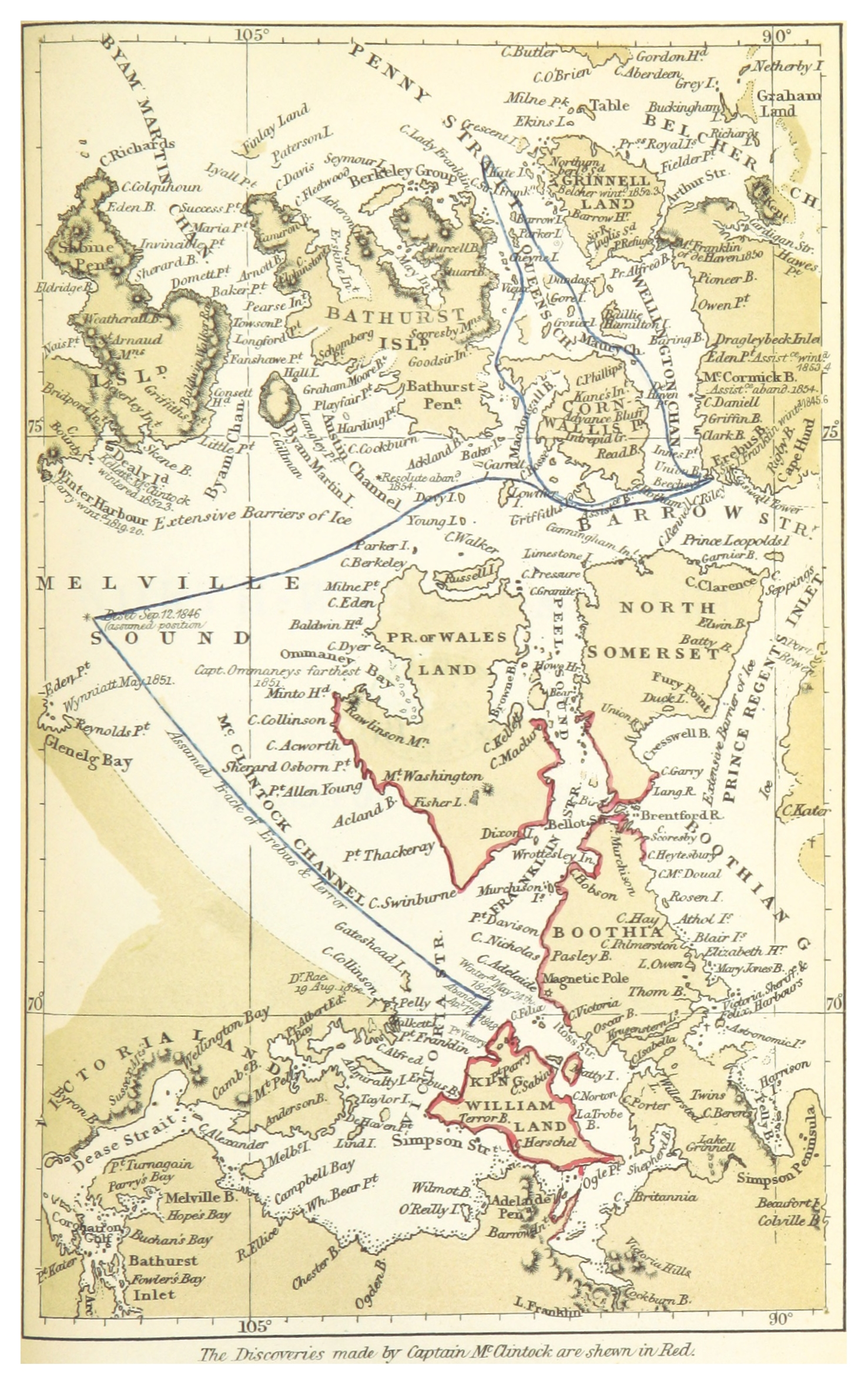
The probable routes taken by HMS Erebus and HMS Terror during Franklin's lost expedition; from John Brown's book

Brown became a noted advocate of expeditions in search of Sir John Franklin. He defined the area which the expedition was ultimately found to have reached, but was not attended to at the time. He published The North-west Passage and the Plans for the Search for Sir John Franklin: a review (1860). He was complimented on this work by Alexander von Humboldt. Brown made large collections illustrative of Arctic adventure.

His wife Jane predeceased him, and he died in 1861, leaving three sons and two daughters. He was buried in a family grave on the western side of Highgate Cemetery.

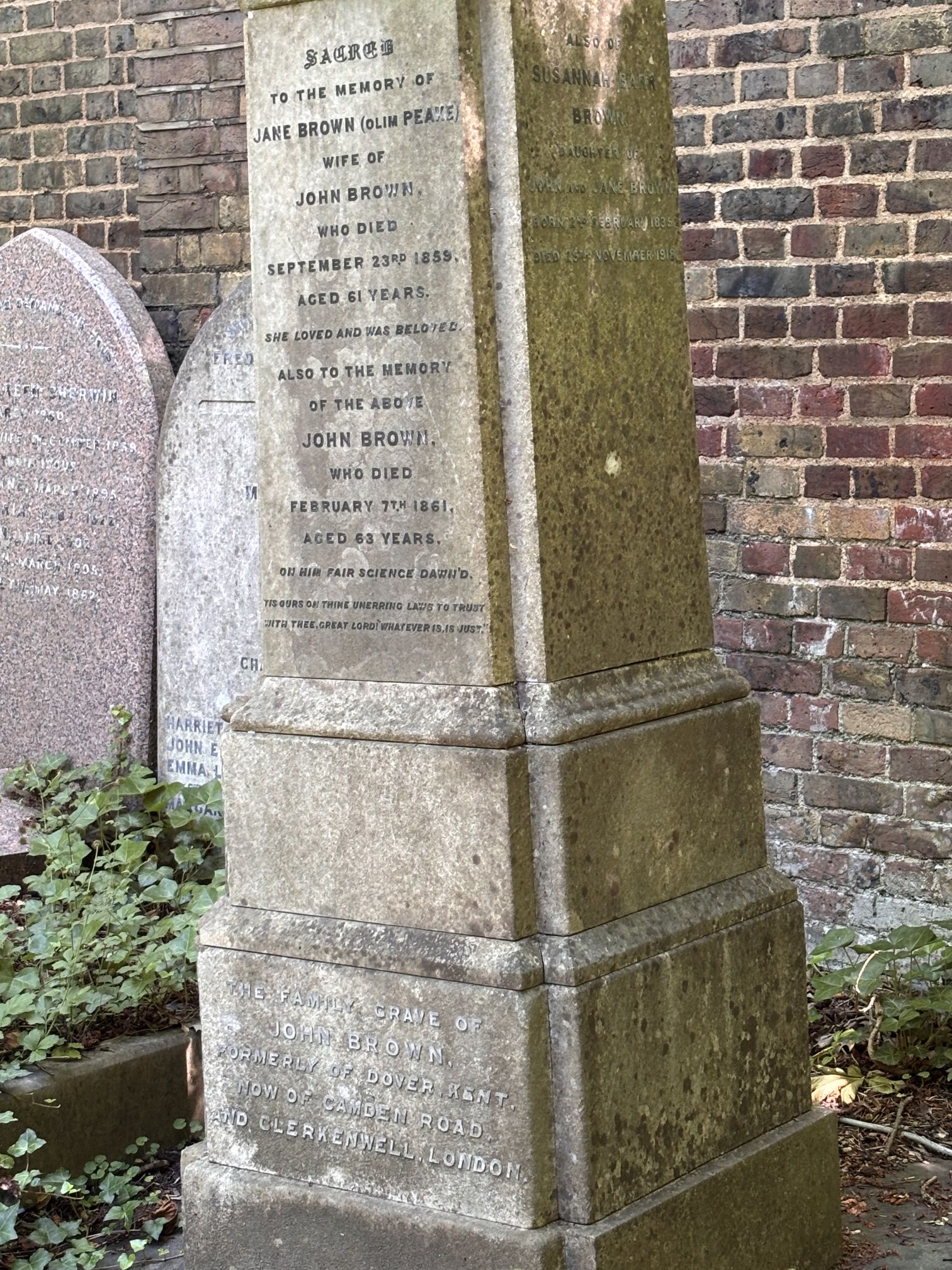
Grave of John Brown on the west side of Highgate Cemetery
