= Léon Rostan =

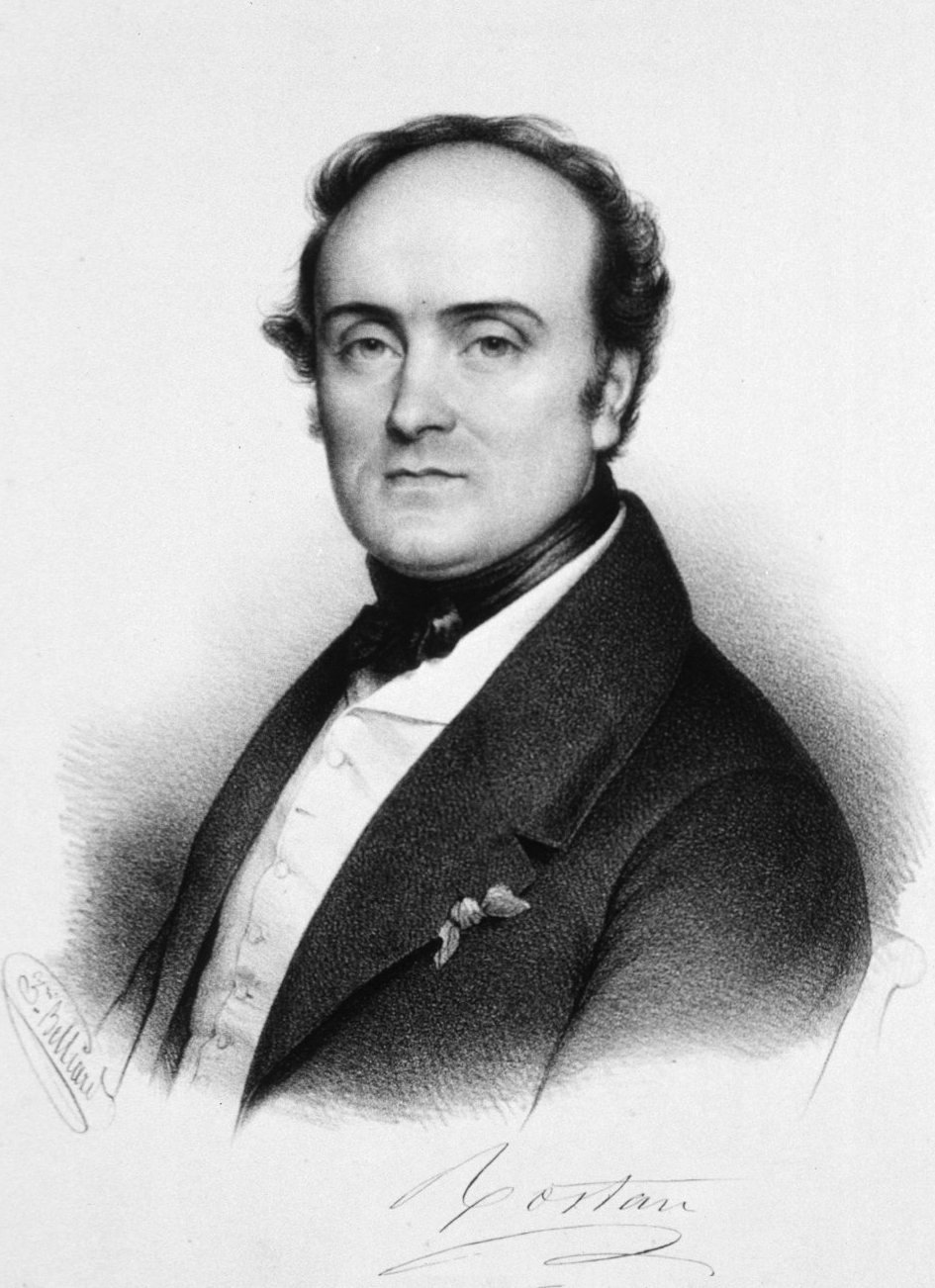
Léon Louis Rostan

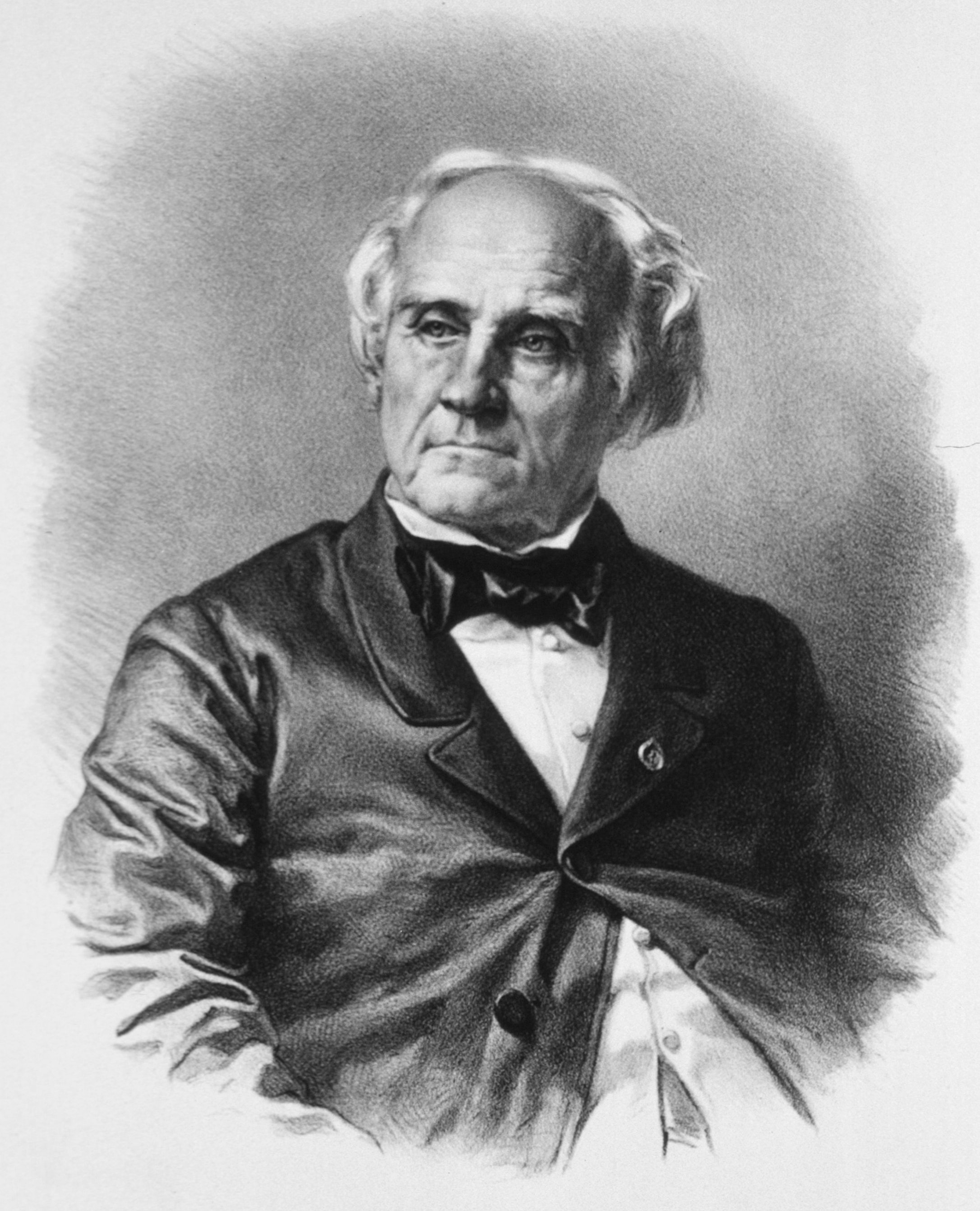
Léon Louis Rostan

Léon Louis Rostan (17 March 1790 – 4 October 1866) was a French internist and a member of the Académie Nationale de Médecine.

Rostan was born in Saint-Maximin-la-Sainte-Baume, and studied medicine in Marseille and Paris. He was a disciple of Philippe Pinel (1745–1826), and for much of his professional career was associated with the Salpêtrière Hospital in Paris.

In 1819 Rostan was the author of Recherches sur le ramollissement du cerveau (Researches on cerebral softening), in which he provided the first accurate description of spontaneous cerebral softening. He documented that the disorder was a specific anatomo-clinic entity that was different from encephalitis and apoplexy. His findings were harshly criticised by followers of Broussais' teachings on physiological medicine, who claimed that brain softenings were the result of an inflammation process, and therefore should be depicted as encephalitis.

He also did extensive research of animal magnetism and somnambulism, and wrote a treatise on charlatanism for his graduate thesis. Rostan performed early studies on the classification of body types, using descriptive terms such as respiratory-cerebral, muscular and digestive in his analysis.

In 1845, he was elected a foreign member of the Royal Swedish Academy of Sciences.

== Associated eponym ==
- "Rostan's asthma": Known today as paroxysmal nocturnal dyspnea. A type of cardiac asthma associated with heart disease, such as left ventricular failure.

== Selected writings ==
- Recherches sur le cerveau du ramollissement (1820, translated into German in 1824)
- Cours élémentaire d'hygiène (1821–22, two volumes)
- Traité élémentaire de diagnostic, de pronostic, d'indication thérapeutique (1826)
