= Dunbar Isidore Heath =

English clergyman

Dunbar Isidore Heath (3 March 1816, in London – 27 May 1888) was an English clergyman prosecuted for heresy in 1861; he was a Cambridge Apostle.

== Life ==
Dunbar Heath was the third son of George Heath, serjeant-at-law. He was educated at Trinity College, Cambridge, where he was elected scholar in 1836, and graduated B.A. in 1838. From 1840 to 1847 he was a fellow of Trinity. As a recognized authority on Egyptology, he was one of the early translators of the papyri in the British Museum. In 1852 Heath wrote The Future Human Kingdom of Christ, in which he distinguished the "saved nations from the glorified saints" by outlining an early concept of "the two salvations". He was prosecuted for heresy in 1861 by the Bishop of Winchester and sentenced by the Court of Arches for publishing these ideas. He would not recant and tried to appeal his sentence by attempting to defend his character and doctrine from the Scriptures through the writing of several booklets. All of this failed and as a result of this prosecution he suffered not only the loss of his profession, but sustained heavy financial losses as well.

By 1866 he had become a member of The Cannibal Club.

Heath edited the Journal of Anthropology.
