= Hyde Clarke =

English engineer, philologist and author

- Born: Henry Harcourt Hyde Clarke; 14 December 1815; Barbican, London
- Died: 1 March 1895 (aged 79); Mayfair, London
- Occupations: Engineer; Philologist; Author
- Spouse: Maria Mildred Eaton
- Children: Henry Harcourt Hyde Clarke; Edgiva Mildred Harcourt Hyde Clarke
- Writing career
- Language: English
- Subjects: Engineering; Philology; Science

Henry Harcourt Hyde Clarke (14 December 1815 – 1 March 1895) was an English engineer, philologist and author.

The son of Henry and Susannah Clarke, he was born at Little Bell Alley, Barbican in London. He edited the Railway Register from 1845 to 1847 and founded the London and County Bank. He was a member of the British Association for the Advancement of Science. He was expelled from the Anthropological Society of London on 22 August 1868 in the wake of public allegations he had made concerning (chiefly) the mismanagement of accounts of that body. He was elected a Fellow of the Royal Statistical Society on 19 December 1876.

He corresponded with Charles Darwin.

== Family ==
He married Maria Mildred Eaton, with one son one daughter:

- Henry Harcourt Hyde Clarke (29 May 1852 – 1906)
- Edgiva Mildred Harcourt Hyde Clarke (23 August 1854 – 1918)

Maria died at their home, 32 St George's Square, Mayfair, London, in 1892 aged 71. He died at their home on 1 March 1895, aged 79.

== Principal works ==
- Physical economy a preliminary inquiry into the physical laws governing the periods of famines and panics. 1847
- Life of Richard Trevithick, C.E.; Life of George Stephenson, C.E. 1848
- Contributions to railway statistics in 1846, 1847, & 1848 1849
- A grammar of the English tongue, spoken and written; for self-teaching and for schools. 1859
- Memoir of the comparative grammar of Egyptian, Coptic & Ude 1873
- Researches in prehistoric and protohistoric comparative philology, mythology, and archæology, in connection with the origin of culture in America and the Accad or Sumerian families. 1875
- The Khita and Khita-Peruvian epoch: Khita, Hamath, Hittite, Canaanite, Etruscan, Peruvian, Mexican, etc. 1877
- Himalayan Origin and Connection of the Magyar and Ugrian. 1877
- A short handbook of the comparative philology of the English, Anglo-Saxon, Frisian, Flemish or Dutch, Low or Platt Dutch, High Dutch or German, Danish, Swedish, Icelandic, Latin, Italian, French, Spanish, and Portuguese tongues. 1879
- The early history of the Mediterranean populations, &c., in their migrations and settlements : illustrated from Autonomous Coins, Gems, Inscriptions, &C. 1882
- Examination of the Legend of Atlantis in Reference to Protohistoric Communication with America, London, 1886
