= Société Ethnologique de Paris =

French learned society set up by William Frédéric Edwards

The Société Ethnologique de Paris was a French learned society set up by William Frédéric Edwards in 1839. At the time, ethnology was a neologism (ethnologie in French), and the Société was the first association of scholars and travellers to have as its central concern race. It is considered a significant institution in the rise of the social sciences, though there had been earlier societies in the area in the first decades of the 19th century. It was formally dissolved in 1862, long after it had ceased to be active.

The effective manifesto of the Société was Des charactères physiologiques des races humaines considérés dans leurs rapports avec l'histoire, a pamphlet of Edwards from a decade earlier. The group brought together by Edwards included linguists and geographers. The aim was to study human variability, and draw racially based conclusions. Edwards was the first President, with Imbert des Mottelettes as Secretary, but he died in 1842 and was replaced by the vicomte de Santarém. Franciszek Duchiński was a vice-president.

The Société was active for some years towards the end of the July Monarchy, but then political involvements told against it. Publications appeared to 1847.

The membership of the Société included significant Saint-Simonian figures, among them Gustave d'Eichthal and Ismael Urbain.
