= James Hunt (speech therapist) =

- Born: 1833; Swanage, Dorsetshire
- Died: 29 August 1869 (aged 35–36); Ore Court, Hastings

Academic work
- Discipline: Anthropologist
- Notable works: The Negro's Place in Nature

James Hunt (1833 – 29 August 1869) was a British anthropologist and speech therapist. His clients included Charles Kingsley, Leo Tennyson (son of the poet laureate Alfred Tennyson), and Lewis Carroll.

His other main interest was in anthropology, and in 1863 he established the Anthropological Society of London, which after his death merged with the more established Ethnological Society of London to become the Royal Anthropological Institute.

== Career ==
James Hunt was born in Swanage, Dorset, the son of the speech therapist Thomas Hunt (1802–1851) and his wife Mary. His father trained him in the art of curing stuttering by means of breath exercises, muscle control and building the patient's confidence. He bought a doctorate from the University of Giessen in Germany and set up a practice in 1856 in Regent Street, London. He dedicated his first Manual on the subject to Charles Kingsley who spent three weeks with him in 1859. He moved to Hastings to run residential courses during the summer season with his sister Elizabeth's husband, Rev. Henry F. Rivers.

== Speech therapy ==
Lewis Carroll, children's author, mathematician, and clergyman, had a stammer that was said to have affected his job. The 1861 census shows that Charles Lutwidge Dodgson was staying at Ore House in 1861 and being treated by Hunt. Since his book was published in 1865, it is quite possible that some of it was written during his stay here.

== Anthropology ==
In 1854 he joined the Ethnological Society of London because of his interest in racial differences and from 1859 to 1862 was the honorary secretary. However many members of this society disliked his attacks on humanitarian and missionary societies and the anti-slavery movement. So in 1863, with the help of the explorer Richard Burton, he set up the Anthropological Society of London, becoming its first president. His paper The Negro's place in nature was greeted with boos and hisses when given at the British Association meeting in 1863 because of its defence of slavery in the Confederate States of America and belief in the plurality of the human species.

He established the Anthropological Review as the organ of the society and by 1867 the membership of the Society had reached 500. However, by 1867 allegations by one of the members Hyde Clarke of financial irregularities in his running of the society caused his temporary resignation as president, though he returned in 1868 when Clarke was expelled. This took a toll on his health and in 1869 he died of an inflammation of the brain. The society shortly afterwards started discussions to merge with the Ethnological Society.

== Death ==
He left a widow, Henrietta, and five children and left his books to his nephew W. H. R. Rivers who refused them, though, through unconnected circumstances, he later became an anthropologist himself.

== Publications ==
- Manual of the Philosophy of Voice and Speech, 1859
- Stammering and Stuttering, their nature and treatment, London: Longman, Green, Longman and Roberts, 1861.
- "The Negro's Place in Nature" (1863), Memoirs read before the Anthropological Society of London, 1865.
