= Anthropological Society of London =

British organisation (1863–1871)

The Anthropological Society of London (ASL) was a short-lived organisation of the 1860s whose founders aimed to furnish scientific evidence for white supremacy which they construed in terms of polygenism. It was founded in 1863 by Richard Francis Burton and James Hunt. Hunt had previously been the secretary of the Ethnological Society of London, which was founded in 1843. When he founded the breakaway ASL, Hunt claimed that society had "the object of promoting the study of Anthropology in a strictly scientific manner". Nevertheless, he reminded his audience that, whatever evidence might be uncovered, "we still know that the Races of Europe now have much in their mental and moral nature which the races of Africa have not got." The ASL only lasted 8 years: following Hunt's death in 1869 it was absorbed into the Royal Anthropological Institute of Great Britain and Ireland.

== Prelude to the ASL ==
James Hunt had encountered the disgraced Edinburgh anatomist, Robert Knox in 1855. During the trial of the grave robbers Burke and Hare, Knox had been exposed as the anatomist for whom they had procured their victims' bodies. Despite attacks by hostile mobs, he continued as an anatomist despite never regaining such a steady source of dead bodies. He was debarred from running further teaching by the Royal College of Surgeons of Edinburgh after falsifying records and expelled from the Royal Society of Edinburgh.

== Polygenism versus monogenism ==
The real differences between the two societies ran much deeper. The members of the Ethnological Society were, on the whole, inclined to believe that humans were shaped by their environment; when Charles Darwin published his theory of evolution by natural selection, they supported it. They also advocated in monogenism and tended to be politically liberal, especially on matters related to race.

Hunt and his closest followers tended to be supporters of polygenism and sceptical of Darwin (though they made him an honorary fellow). They found the Ethnological Society's politics distasteful, and (for example) supported the Confederacy in the American Civil War. The issue that most sharply divided the two groups was the "Negro question." In his opening speech to the society Hunt enunciated a strongly racist view:

Whatever may be the conclusion to which our scientific inquiries may lead us, we should always remember, that by whatever means the Negro, for instance, acquired his present physical, mental and moral character, whether he has risen from an ape or descended from a perfect man, we still know that the Races of Europe have now much in their mental and moral nature which the races of Africa have not got.

However he was careful to distance himself from the slave trade:

A serious charge has been made against the American School of Anthropology, when it is affirmed that their interest in keeping up slavery induced the scientific men of that country to advocate a distinct origin for the African race.... I would therefore express a hope that the objects of this Society will never be prostituted to such an object as the support of the slave trade, with all its abuses.

He did this by redefining slavery in such a way that it did not occur in America:

Our Bristol and Liverpool merchants, perhaps, helped to benefit the race when they transplanted some of them to America; and our mistaken legislature has done the Negro race much injury by their absurd and unwarrantable attempts to prevent Africa from exporting her worthless or surplus population.... I cannot shut my eyes to the fact that slavery as understood by the ancients does not exist out of Africa and that the highest type of the Negro race is at present to be found in the Confederate States of America.

According to noted Darwin biographers Adrian Desmond and James Moore, however, founder James Hunt was a paid agent of the Confederate States of America, as were his friend Henry Hotze and two other council members. Their purpose in founding the society was "to swing London opinion during the [American Civil] war." Hunt and Hotze put pro-slavery pseudoscience into the Anthropological Society library, "bought journalists, printed and distributed thousands of pamphlets,... ran a propaganda weekly in Fleet Street, The Index..." and in general promoted the pro-slavery dogma that black people were a separate species and inherently capable of no higher development than that of enslavement.

== Cannibal Club ==
Hunt and Burton established the Cannibal Club as a gentleman's club, which drew many members from within the ASL.

== Merger ==
In 1864, Hunt attempted to persuade the British Association to rename Section E (Geography and Ethnology) to include Anthropology and in 1865 his attempt to create a new Anthropology sub-section devoted to the study of man was strongly resisted by others. However, with the support of T. H. Huxley it was created under Biology section D in 1866, and in 1869, Section E dropped the "Ethnology" part of its title.

At the same time, Hunt's position was weakened by an allegation made by one of the members, Hyde Clarke, about the finances of the organisation. Although he managed to satisfy the other members and expel Clarke, the stress seriously affected his health.

A merger of the two organisations was already under way before Hunt died early at a young age in 1869, and in 1871 they formed the Royal Anthropological Institute of Great Britain and Ireland.

== Other organisations ==
In 1873, Richard Burton and others founded a breakaway London Anthropological Society which for several years published a journal Anthropologia. Burton said "My motive was to supply travellers with an organ that would rescue their observations from the outer darkness of manuscripts and print their curious information on social and sexual matters out of place in the popular book".

There was also an Anthropological Society of London founded in 1836 by John Isaac Hawkins which had more to do with phrenology.

== Publications ==
- Memoirs read before the Anthropological Society of London Vol 1: 1863–4, 2: 1865–6, 3: 1867–9
- Journal of the Anthropological Society of London Vol 7: 1868
- Anthropological Review. Vol 1, 2: 1864, 3, 4, 5, 6, 7, 8: 1870
- Journal of Anthropology. No. I–III: 1870–1.
- The Popular Magazine of Anthropology. Vol 1
- Anthropologia. Vol. 1. London: Baillière, Tindall and Cox. [1873–1875]
