= Anthropology of human rights =

Subfield of sociocultural and legal anthropology

Anthropology of human rights is a subfield of sociocultural and legal anthropology that studies how ideas of "rights" are made, circulated, and used in practice. Instead of treating rights primarily as legal rules, it examines the languages, institutions, and everyday interactions through which claims about human rights acquire meaning and authority. Research follows rights as they move across sites and analyze how power relations shape who is heard, what counts as evidence, and which harms become visible.

As an area of inquiry, it grew from post-World War II debates about universalism and culture into a consolidated program that couples ethnography with institutional and documentary analysis. Classic concerns with cultural difference are reframed through attention to how global norms are re‑expressed locally and how people come to inhabit rights‑bearing identities. Contemporary scholarship extends to governance arrangements beyond the state, including arenas where corporations, states, civil society, and philanthropies co‑produce human rights standards.

== Scope and definitions ==
=== Analytical orientation ===
Human rights anthropology examines how ideas of "rights" are created, adapted, put into action, and debated across different social worlds. Rather than treating human rights as a fixed legal doctrine, anthropologists approach them as a series of fluctuating discourses and practices.

Leiden University anthropology professor, Matthew Canfield, and human rights advocate, Sara Davis, argue that the concatenation of performances, meanings, and strategies surrounding human rights is shaped by quotidian experience and therefore, best studied through ethnographic methods. This perspective emphasizes how rights language interacts with local norms, how global standards are re-expressed in vernacular terms, and how participation in "rights arenas" (e.g. the mechanisms that implement human rights treatises) fosters new forms of political identity.

The field's scope ranges from transnational institutions (UN bodies, NGOs, International courts) to community forums and social movements. Much scholarship maps the "betweenness" of rights practice: how claims move ambiguously between the “global” and the “local,” through networks as well as through the moral and legal imaginations of varied actors. Mark Goodale, anthropology professor at the University of Lausanne, believes this "betweenness" helps human rights anthropologists understand the uneven distribution of power and cautions against imagining human rights as simply "imposed from the top down" or "demanded from the bottom up."

=== Definitions and key concepts ===
Within this field, "human rights" are defined pragmatically and historically. Anthropologists analyze the international legal frameworks (e.g., the Universal Declaration of Human Rights) alongside the state institutions that enforce (or fail to enforce) rights. As cultural anthropologist Talal Asad notes, "only the state can enforce norms as the law...[h]uman rights depend on national rights," and the legal categories embedded in classic citizenship theory (civil, political, social rights) traveled into post‑1948 human rights through this state-centered genealogy. Asad's framing underscores a core conceptual tension in human rights anthropology: the convergence between “rule of law" and social justice.

A second definitional strand treats human rights as an idiom of social justice mobilization, foregrounding ethical restraint, humility toward multiplicity of definitions, and attention to social practice. UConn anthropology professor Sarah Willen describes this outlook in terms such as "emergent cosmopolitanism" and "well‑tempered" humanism, noting that within anthropology's own professional debates, human rights are framed as evolving rather than static concepts. The American Anthropological Association’s 1999 Declaration on Anthropology and Human Rights explicitly states that understandings of human rights change as knowledge of the human condition develops.

Other key analytical terms include Vernacularization (the translation of transnational norms into locally resonant idioms) and indigenization (the reframing of new ideas in terms of existing values). Ethnographic research explores how such translation is done by "intermediaries," and how it can both enable mobilization and provoke resistance. The focus on translation is not merely linguistic: scholars show how rights discourse reconfigures identities and relations to produce new individual and collective subjects who come to see themselves, and their claims, through the lens of rights.

=== Sites and scales of analysis ===
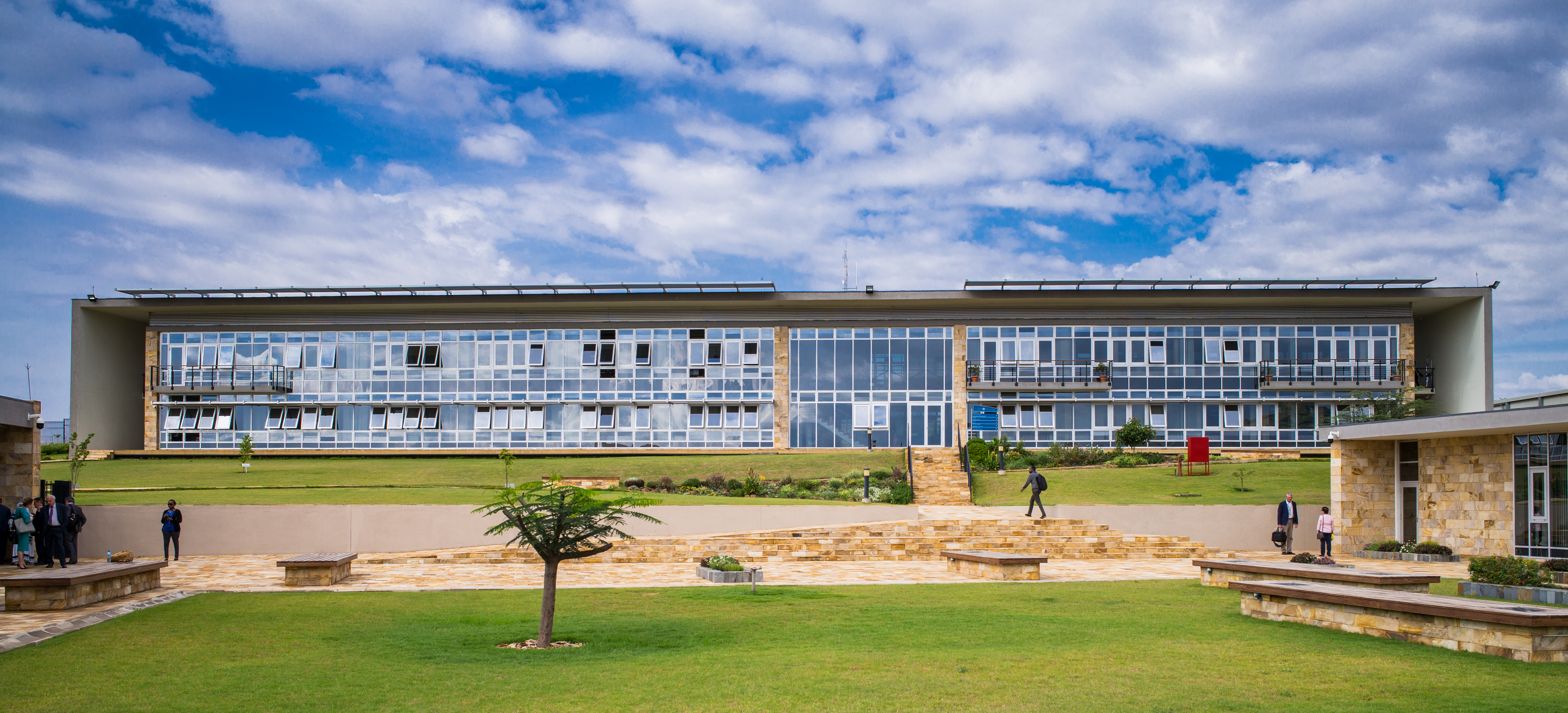
International Residual Mechanism for Criminal Tribunals building in Arusha, Tanzania

Some scholarship extends human rights anthropology's scope to new governance spaces (such as multistakeholder processes in global health, food, and development), where corporations, states, civil society, and philanthropies co‑produce standards and channel resources. Here, researchers examine how participation shapes the subjectivities, strategies, and moral power of civil society actors, and how rights meanings are transformed in these hybrid arenas. This work retains the field's signature emphasis on relational power and ethnographic analysis of practice.

At the level of first principles, contemporary scholarship often reframes the classic universalism–relativism debate in terms of recognition. Drawing on social‑philosophical accounts, some anthropologists analyze how claims to dignity and personhood are enacted across the institutional spheres of intimacy ("love"), legality ("law"), and civil society ("solidarity"). This “recognition” lens maintains skepticism toward Eurocentric universalists while showing how universalist aspirations are produced in situ through situated struggles, an approach that helps explain why disenfranchised actors continue to use rights language in spite of its ambivalences.

In short, the anthropology of human rights occupies a distinctive niche: it extends core anthropological commitments to ethnography and context to the transnational life of "human rights," while offering an alternative to doctrinal or compliance-centered approaches and to anthropologies that treat "culture" or "law" as bounded domains.

== Historical development ==
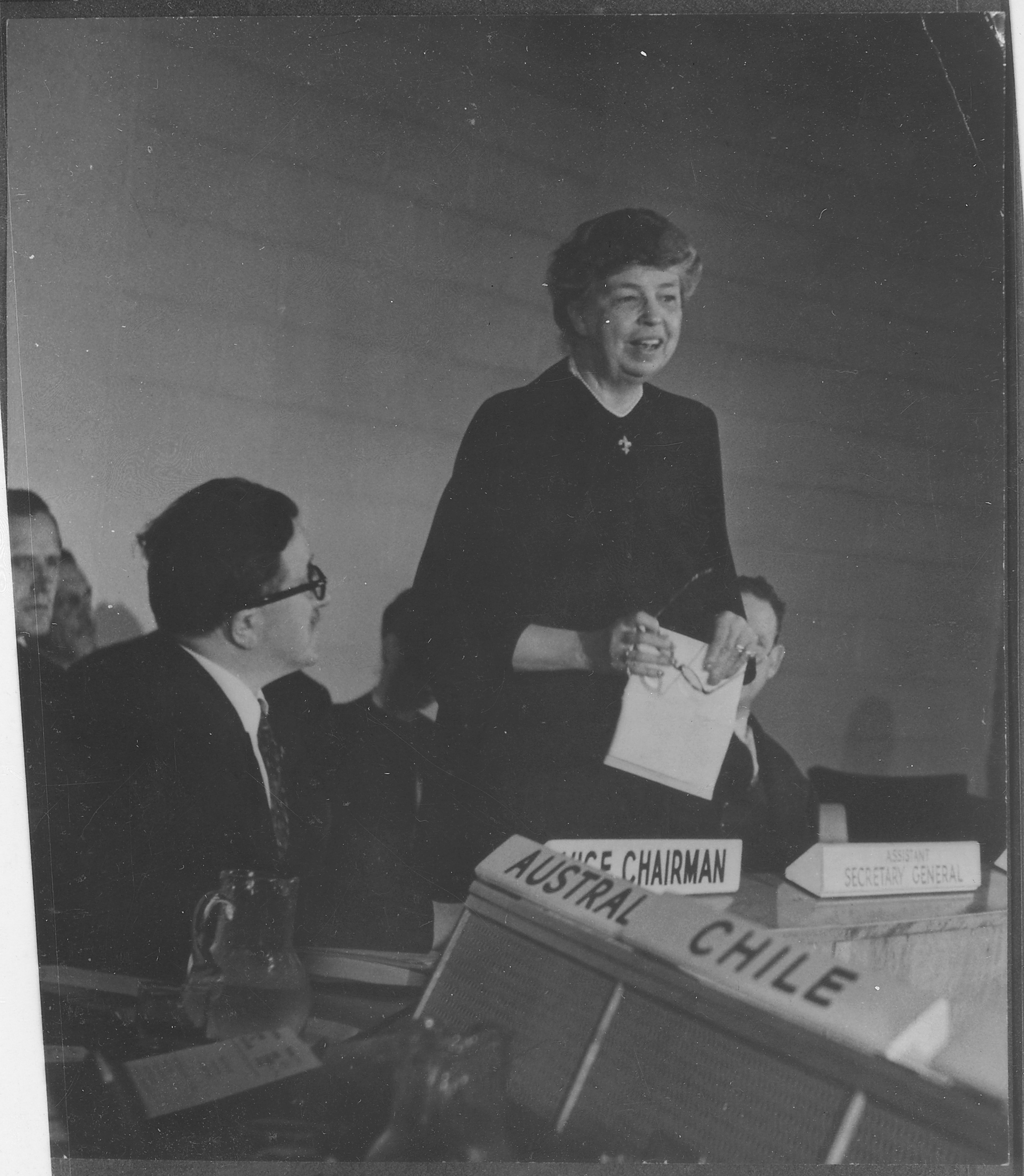
Eleanor Roosevelt at a United Nations for Human Rights Commission meeting in Lake Success, New York, in 1947

Specialists generally trace the anthropological study of human rights to two intertwined lineages: (1) the intellectual genealogy of rights as an object of inquiry and (2) anthropology's own, often ambivalent, engagements with that object. On the first lineage, medieval historian Walter Ullmann has traced the emergence of the conception of rights to post-classical political thought in Latin Christendom, where "natural right" was rooted in feudal status and obligations defined by birth rather than in universal entitlements.

=== 20th century ===
On the second lineage, an early and influential moment was the American Anthropological Association's (AAA) 1947 "Statement on Human Rights," drafted by Melville Herskovits and transmitted to UNESCO. In response to the United Nations’ efforts to draft a Universal Declaration of Human Rights just after WWII, they advanced a moral relativist position; the AAA recognized human beings as one species and "ideas of good and evil existing in all societies, but it also argued that how rights/morals are expressed or valued differs by culture. Herskovits warned that imposing one conception on another would be tantamount to cultural imperialism. The framework has persisted for decades and sparked significant controversy, with many anthropologists later regarding the position as somewhat "embarrassing" or "problematic." Today's human rights framework is more global, as scholars and activists from many universities and learned societies have used it to push for recognition and change.

In the late 1940s, Eleanor Roosevelt, who was Chair of the United Nations Commission on Human Rights until 1951, gave speeches envisioning a "curious grapevine"; she imagined the Universal Declaration of Human Rights would travel "behind the walls of repressive states and ideologies, to reach those most in need of its protections." In his 2009 book, Surrendering to Utopia, Mark Goodale regards the former first lady's vision as both prescient and radical. In a review of Goodale's book, Sarah Willen articulates Roosevelt's view as "prescient in its anticipation of the contemporary NGO-led transnational human rights networks, and radical in gesturing well beyond the international system from whence it came, a system with seventeenth-century origins toward a world that is...possibly even postnationalist."

From the late 1980s through the 1990s, anthropology's stance shifted markedly. Scholars identify this period as a "re-engagement," marked by increased fieldwork on rights claims and organizational change within the American Anthropological Association (AAA). Milestones included the AAA's 1990 investigative commission on Brazilian Yanomami territory encroachments, the establishment of a permanent Commission for Human Rights (later the Committee on Human Rights), and, crucially, the 1999 Declaration on Anthropology and Human Rights, which repudiated the 1947 position and affirmed that understandings of rights evolve with knowledge of the human condition. Commentators at the time described this as a "radical realignment" within U.S. anthropology and, in some contexts, a partial reconstitution of the AAA as a transnational human-rights actor.

In parallel, ethnographic approaches consolidated what many now call an "anthropology of human rights." This work followed how rights were translated into practice in concrete contexts such as Fiji's use of bulubulu reconciliation in rape cases under CEDAW review, Indian feminist activism reframing reproductive health as a matter of rights after the 1994 Cairo conference, and Bolivian indigenous movements articulating land and resource claims through human rights discourse alongside Marxist idioms.

=== 21st century ===
By the mid-2000s, this intellectual turn was visible in core venues. In 2006, Richard Ashby Wilson published a special feature in American Anthropologist entitled "Anthropology and Human Rights in a New Key", which situated itself as a follow-up to the Herskovits’ 1947 publication in a marked re-engagement between the disciplines. The issue included Jane Cowan’s call to rethink “rights processes” as heterogeneous fields of subject formation, Annelise Riles’ critique of the predominance of instrumentalist legal knowledge, and Shannon Speed's argument for critically engaged activist research.

Together, these essays highlighted both the emancipatory appeal and the risks of rights talk: its use by marginalized actors to contest injustice, but also its capture by governments and abusers for purposes anthropologists often reject. For example, in post-apartheid South Africa, both Communist Party members and conservative neoliberals celebrated the 1996 Constitution’s rights provisions, a phenomenon Wilson used to illustrate how human rights could be embraced by ideologically opposed groups for divergent ends. The cluster also helped normalize attention to the translation and vernacularization of rights as conceptualized by American anthropology professor Sally Engle Merry.

From the 2010s onward, two trends stand out. First, critics like historian Samuel Moyn argued that contemporary human rights discourse had narrowed into a humanitarian moral project focused on individual suffering, increasingly decoupled from political emancipation or structural redistribution. Second, other scholars such as German philosopher Axel Honneth, drew on recognition theory to call for frameworks that explain why disenfranchised actors continue to use rights language despite repeated disappointments. For example, in Shannon Speed's 2008 ethnography in Chiapas, different members of the same indigenous community interpreted human rights in opposite ways. Despite this ambivalence, both sides still used the idiom of rights to argue over what it meant to be a "true Ch'ol subject."

Institutionally, the field's consolidation is evident not only in journals and handbooks but also in teaching programs and public debate. Review essays from the early 2010s noted the spread of human‑rights curricula and the discipline's sustained engagement with legal, philosophical, and socio‑legal interlocutors, signs Willen believes are indicators of a once‑reticent field becoming a durable, empirically-grounded subfield of anthropological inquiry.

== Research methods ==
Anthropologists study human rights primarily through long‑term, multi‑sited ethnography that follows claims, categories, and actors across community settings, NGOs, courts, and intergovernmental venues. Fieldwork pairs participant observation and interviewing with close analysis of meetings and documents in what Riles calls the "culture of legal knowledge," allowing researchers to observe how authority, expertise, and procedural norms are enacted in expert forums and treaty‑body sessions.

A distinctive technique is to "map the middle": tracing the translators, caseworkers, and advocacy brokers who move ideas and grievances up and down between local and transnational human rights discourse. Human rights anthropologists also document how unequal funding relationships and state agendas shape those translation chains.

Documents and metrics are treated as ethnographic artifacts. Researchers read forms, case files, country reports, and indicator frameworks to show how quantification reorganizes monitoring and re‑distributes influence toward those who design measures and control funding. Human‑rights ethnography also extends into elite and expert settings through institutional and para‑ethnographic approaches, examining how lawyers, officials, and advocates appropriate social‑science tools.

== Violence, security, and the politics of visibility ==
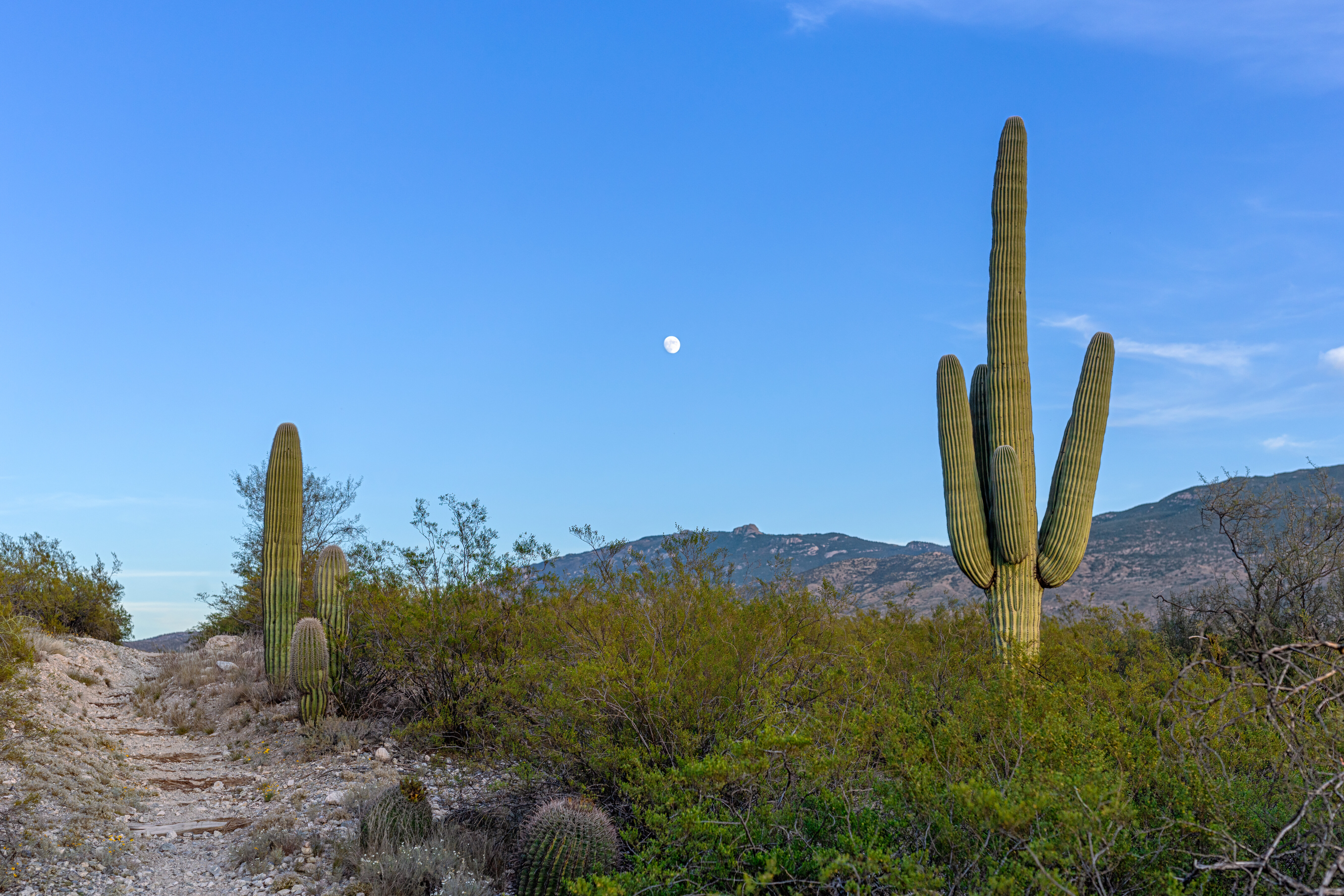
Landscape of the Sonoran Desert in Pima County, Arizona, where 2,238 bodies of migrants were found between 1990 and 2012. Anthropologists have described the policies that produced this outcome as their own discrete forms of violence.

Recent work in the anthropology of human rights has analyzed how harm is produced, managed, and made (in)visible across environmental, corporate, border, and national security regimes. South African author Rob Nixon dubbed such dispersed, delayed harms slow violence: attritional damage whose casualties are difficult to assess, far in time from the original cause, and/or politically discounted. In his 2011 book Slow Violence and the Environmentalism of the Poor, Nixon argues that this unique type of violence is "insidiously invisible," posing distinctive representational and advocacy challenges.

In his 2015 book The Land of Open Graves, documenting the U.S.–Mexico border, anthropologist Jason De León examines how "Prevention Through Deterrence" functionally outsources lethality to desert ecologies. De León uses methods from all four subfields of anthropology to describe a phenomenon he calls necroviolence: post‑mortem harm that extends sovereignty’s reach onto migrant corpses via taphonomic processes (i.e. exposure, decomposition) that are socially organized by policy design. De León argues that depicting the desert "deathscape" renders visible a violence deliberately pushed out of public view.

Corporate restructuring likewise figures in human‑rights ethnography. Studying Coca‑Cola workers in Colombia in 2006, Vanderbilt anthropology professor Lesley Gill documented how neoliberal labor reforms and paramilitary violence fragment social relations, erode union protections, and generate impunity, pushing trade unionists to build transnational alliances and to recast rights claims around economic security and gendered livelihoods. Drawing on the work of Marxist geographer, David Harvey, Gill's account links corporate supply chains, state security practices, and selective anti‑union targeting to what she reads as "accumulation by dispossession," thereby situating labor rights within broader fields of coercion and market reform.

In Bolivia, Rutgers University anthropology professor, Daniel M. Goldstein, tracks the rise of citizen security as a rights‑inflected development agenda and explores its contradictory reception among urban poor communities under and after the Morales government. While donors and policymakers frame "security" as a right enabling other rights, some residents experience rights discourse as externally imposed and permissive of crime, legitimizing community justice practices (including lynchings) that themselves raise human‑rights concerns.

A parallel line of research examines cultural rights as collective entitlements that sometimes collide with individual, "basic" human rights. Working from Colombian cases, MIT anthropologist Jean E. Jackson analyzes the uneasy fit between state projects of multicultural recognition and local appeals to "rights to culture/difference," showing how both government actors and indigenous pueblos mobilize "culture" in disputes over jurisdiction, land, and membership.

Taken together, these studies reposition the field toward forms of harm that are durational, post‑mortem, mediated by non-government actors, and increasingly securitized. Modern human rights anthropology foregrounds evidentiary labor, such as mapping political infrastructures that distribute risk and representational labor, such as how to render attritional damage and desert deathscapes legible.

== See also ==
- Legal anthropology
- Sociocultural anthropology
- Sociology of art
