= Russell Tuttle =

- Born: Russell Howard Tuttle; August 18, 1939 (age 87)
- Scientific career
- Fields: Paleoanthropology; Linguistics; Archaeology; Sociocultural anthropology Biological anthropology
- Workplaces: University of Chicago

Russell Howard Tuttle (born August 18, 1939 - died September 18, 2026) is a distinguished primate morphologist, paleoanthropologist, and a four-field (linguistics, archaeology, sociocultural anthropology and biological anthropology) trained Anthropologist. He was an active Professor of Anthropology, Evolutionary Biology, History of Science and Medicine at the University of Chicago. Tuttle was enlisted by Mary Leakey to analyze the 3.4-million-year-old footprints she discovered in Laetoli, Tanzania. He determined that the creatures that left these prints walked bipedally in a fashion almost identical to human beings. He lived in Chicago, Illinois.

Tuttle was named Guggenheim Fellow in 1985 and a Fellow of the American Association for the Advancement of Science (AAAS) in 2003. In 2006, he received the Quantrell Award.
