= Mosaic physics =

Mosaic physics or mosaic philosophy refers to the attempt to combine an understanding of the Biblical account of the Book of Genesis (allegedly written by Moses) with a scientific understanding of the natural world. Otto Casmann attempted Mosaic physics.
