= Magnus Hundt =

German philosopher, physician and theologian

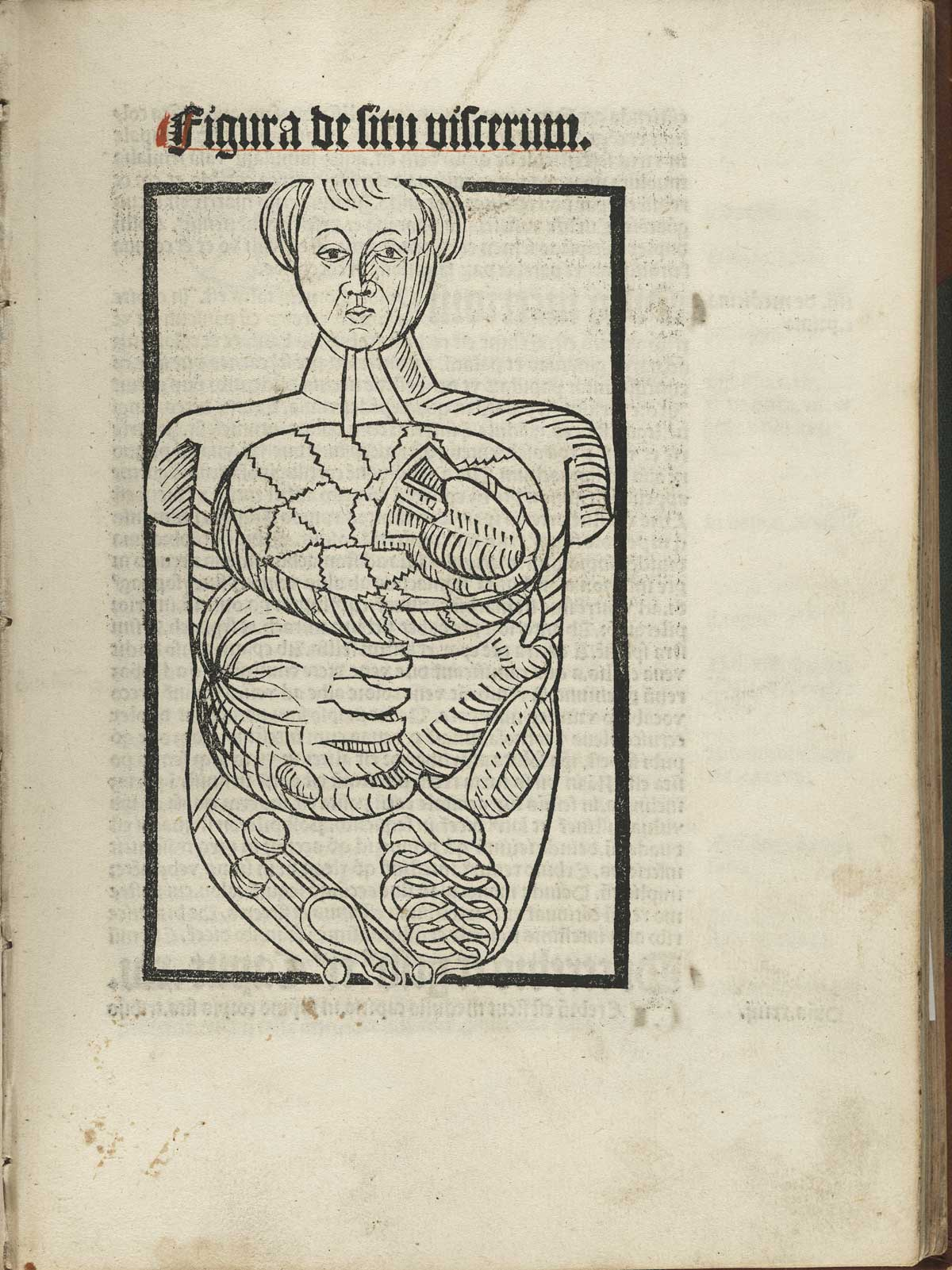
From Magnus Hundt's Antropologium de hominis dignitate. (Bologna, 1523).

Magnus Hundt or Magnus Canis (1449 in Magdeburg – 1519 in Meißen), also known as Parthenopolitanus, was a German philosopher, physician and theologian. Hundt coined the term anthropology, and he and Otto Casmann have been mentioned as founders of anthropology since they used the term in the 16th century.

== Background ==
Hundt was born in Magdeburg in 1449 and began his studies in Leipzig at the age of 33, receiving a Baccalaureate in 1484. In 1487, the year he received his advanced degree, he was appointed dean of the Faculty of Arts, and in 1499 he became rector of the University. At some point in his career he is believed to have served as physician to Count Schlick of Joachimsthal. His interests went beyond medicine, and in 1510 he received a doctorate in theology and held a chair in same subject at the University in Meissen, where the University of Leipzig had relocated because of the plague. He died in that city in 1519. During his lifetime, Hundt, also known as Magnus Hund and Magnus Canis ("Big Dog" in Latin), composed a book on grammar, commentaries on St. Augustine and Pierre Lombard, and diverse philosophical works.

== Antropologium ==
Magnus Hundt's Antropologium de hominis dignitate, natura et proprietatibus, de elementis, partibus et membris humani corporis, published in Leipzig in 1501, serves to explain the body not only anatomically and physiologically, but philosophically and religiously too, stating that humans were created in the image of God and represent a microcosm of the world as God created it. Although the field has evolved to mean something different from how it is used in this work, Hundt's Antropologium contains the first mention ever of the term anthropology. Antropologium contains 17 woodcut illustrations of human anatomy, one of which, the human head on the verso of the title page, is repeated once. The illustrations are schematic, rather than accurate depictions. Some of the smaller images first appeared, though often in a more crude form, in Johann Peyligk's Philosophie Naturalis Compendium (Leipzig: Melchior Lotter, 1499).
