= Terrain (journal) =

- Discipline: Anthropology
- Language: French

Publication details
- History: October 1983 – present
- Publisher: Archéologie, Ethnologie, Inventaire et Système d'Information section of the Ministry of Culture and the Maison des Sciences de L'Homme in Paris (France)
- Frequency: Biannual
- Open access: Delayed open access journal (4.5 years)

Standard abbreviations
- ISO 4: Terrain

Indexing
- ISSN: 1777-5450

Links
- Journal homepage

Terrain is a French academic journal of ethnology, social and cultural anthropology (the three terms are not clearly distinguished in France). Each issue is entirely devoted to a specific theme.

It aims to address both specialists and the educated public. It was initially focused on contemporary France society and then extended to Europe; it also addresses theoretical considerations, using language accessible to the public.
