= Anthropology =

Scientific study of humans, human behavior, and societies

Anthropology is the scientific study of humanity that crosses biology and sociology, concerned with human behavior, human biology, cultures, societies, and linguistics, in both the present and past, including archaic humans. Social anthropology studies patterns of behavior, while cultural anthropology studies cultural meaning, including norms and values. The term sociocultural anthropology is commonly used today. Linguistic anthropology studies how language influences social life. Biological (or physical) anthropology studies the biology and evolution of humans and their close primate relatives.

Archaeology, often referred to as the "anthropology of the past," explores human activity by examining physical remains. In North America and Asia, it is generally regarded as a branch of anthropology. In contrast, in Europe, it is considered either an independent discipline or a subfield of related disciplines such as history and paleontology.

== Etymology ==
The abstract noun anthropology is first attested in reference to history. (Note: Richard Harvey's 1593 Philadelphus, a defense of the legend of Brutus in British history, includes the passage "Genealogy or issue which they had, Artes which they studied, Actes which they did. This part of History is named Anthropology.") Its present use first appeared in Renaissance Germany in the works of Magnus Hundt and Otto Casmann. Their Neo-Latin anthropologia derived from the combining forms of the Greek words ánthrōpos (ἄνθρωπος, "human") and lógos (λόγος, "study"). Its adjectival form appeared in the works of Aristotle. It began to be used in English, possibly via French Anthropologie, by the early 18th century. (Note: John Kersey's 1706 edition of The New World of English Words includes the definition "Anthropology, a Discourse or Description of Man, or of a Man's Body.")

== Origin and development of the term ==
=== Through the 19th century ===
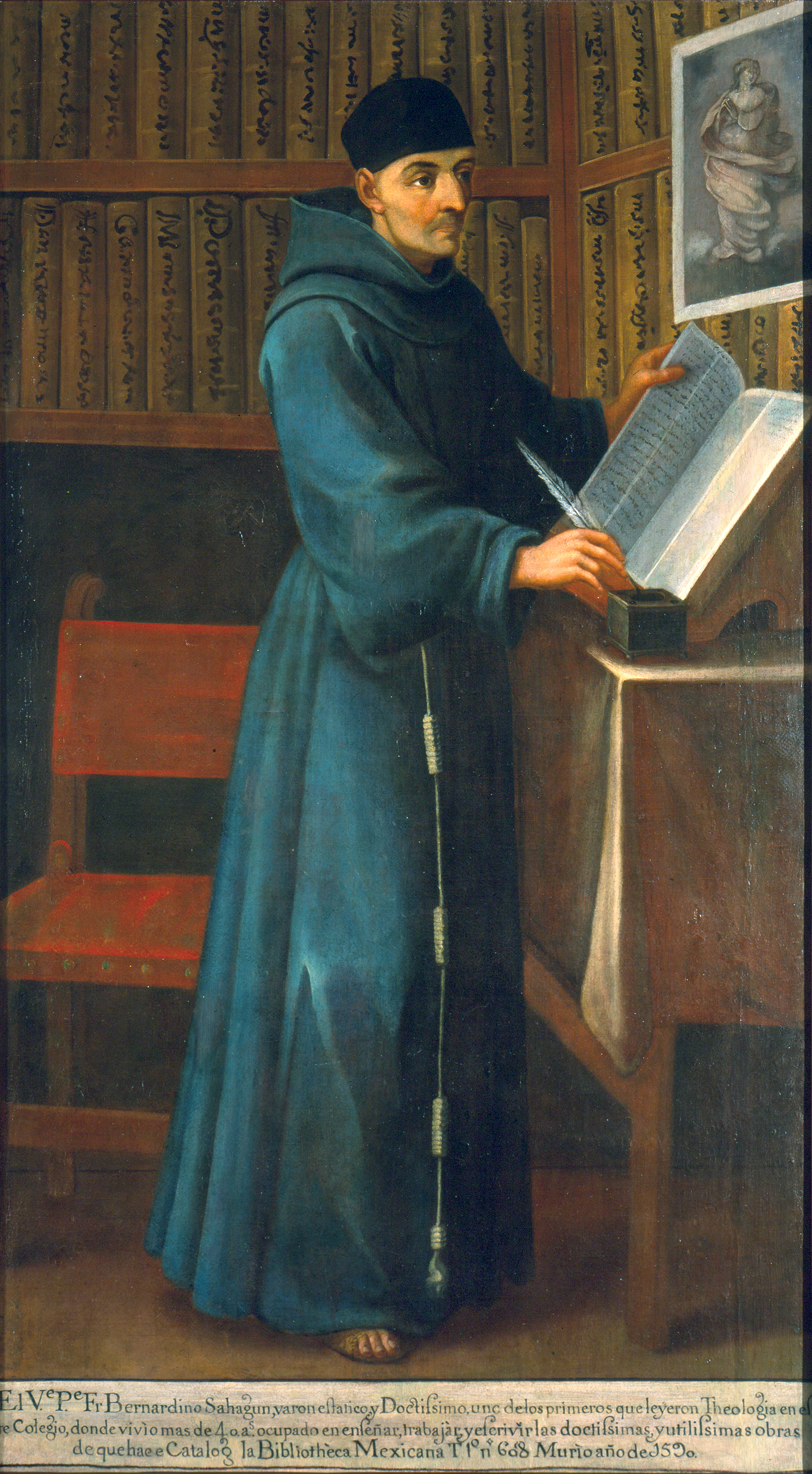
Bernardino de Sahagún is considered to be the founder of modern anthropology.

In 1647, the Bartholins, early scholars of the University of Copenhagen, defined l'anthropologie as follows:

Anthropology, that is to say the science that treats of man, is divided ordinarily and with reason into Anatomy, which considers the body and the parts, and Psychology, which speaks of the soul. (Note: In French: L'Anthropologie, c'est à dire la science qui traite de l'homme, est divisée ordinairment & avec raison en l'Anatomie, qui considere le corps & les parties, et en la Psychologie, qui parle de l'Ame.)

Sporadic use of the term for some of the subject matter occurred subsequently, including its use by Étienne Serres in 1839 to describe the natural history, or paleontology, of man, based on comparative anatomy, and the creation of a chair in anthropology and ethnography in 1850 at the French National Museum of Natural History by Jean Louis Armand de Quatrefages de Bréau. Various short-lived organizations of anthropologists had already been formed. The Société Ethnologique de Paris, the first to use the term ethnology, was founded in 1839 and focused on the methodical study of human races. After the death of its founder, William Frédéric Edwards, in 1842, it gradually declined in activity until it eventually dissolved in 1862.

Meanwhile, the Ethnological Society of New York, now the American Ethnological Society, was founded on its model in 1842, as well as the Ethnological Society of London in 1843, a break-away group of the Aborigines' Protection Society.

Anthropology and many other current fields are the intellectual results of the comparative methods developed in the early 19th century. Theorists in diverse fields such as anatomy, linguistics, and ethnology started making feature-by-feature comparisons of their subject matters and were beginning to suspect that similarities between animals, languages, and folkways were the result of processes or laws unknown to them then. For them, the publication of Charles Darwin's On the Origin of Species was the epiphany of everything they had begun to suspect. Darwin himself arrived at his conclusions through comparison of species he had seen in agronomy and in the wild.

Darwin and Wallace unveiled the theory of evolution in the late 1850s. There was an immediate rush to bring it into the social sciences. Paul Broca in Paris was in the process of breaking away from the Société de biologie to form the first of the explicitly anthropological societies, the Société d'Anthropologie de Paris, meeting for the first time in Paris in 1859. (Note: As Fletcher points out, the French society was by no means the first to include anthropology or parts of it as its topic. Previous organizations used other names. The German Anthropological Association of St. Petersburg, however, met first in 1861, but due to the death of its founder, never met again.) When he read Darwin, he became an immediate convert to Transformisme, as the French called evolutionism. His definition now became "the study of the human group, considered as a whole, in its details, and in relation to the rest of nature".

Broca discovered the speech center of the human brain, today called Broca's area. His interest was mainly in biological anthropology. Still, a German philosopher specializing in psychology, Theodor Waitz, took up the theme of general and social anthropology in his six-volume work, entitled Die Anthropologie der Naturvölker, 1859–1864. The title was soon translated as "The Anthropology of Primitive Peoples". The last two volumes were published posthumously.

Waitz defined anthropology as "the science of the nature of man". Following Broca's lead, Waitz points out that anthropology is a new field that would gather material from other fields but would differ from them in its use of comparative anatomy, physiology, and psychology to differentiate man from "the animals nearest to him". He stresses that the data of comparison must be empirical, gathered by experimentation. The history of civilization, as well as ethnology, is to be brought into the comparison. It is to be presumed fundamentally that the species, man, is a unity, and that "the same laws of thought are applicable to all men".

Waitz was influential among British ethnologists. In 1863, the explorer Richard Francis Burton and the speech therapist James Hunt broke away from the Ethnological Society of London to form the Anthropological Society of London, which henceforward would follow the path of the new anthropology rather than just ethnology. It was the 2nd society dedicated to general anthropology. Representatives from the French Société were present, though not Broca. In his keynote address, printed in the first volume of its new publication, The Anthropological Review, Hunt stressed the work of Waitz, adopting his definitions as a standard. (Note: Hunt's choice of theorists does not exclude the numerous other theorists that were beginning to publish a large volume of anthropological studies.) Among the first associates were the young Edward Burnett Tylor, inventor of cultural anthropology, and his brother Alfred Tylor, a geologist. Previously Edward had referred to himself as an ethnologist; subsequently, an anthropologist.

Similar organizations in other countries followed: the Anthropological Society of Madrid (1865), the American Anthropological Association (1902), the Anthropological Society of Vienna (1870), the Italian Society of Anthropology and Ethnology (1871), and many others. The majority of these were evolutionists. One notable exception was the Berlin Society for Anthropology, Ethnology, and Prehistory (1869), founded by Rudolf Virchow, known for his vituperative attacks on the evolutionists. Not religious himself, he insisted that Darwin's conclusions lacked empirical foundation.

During the last three decades of the 19th century, a proliferation of anthropological societies and associations occurred, most independent, most publishing their own journals, and all international in membership and association. The major theorists belonged to these organizations. They supported the gradual osmosis of anthropology curricula into the major institutions of higher learning. By 1898, 48 educational institutions in 13 countries offered some anthropology courses. None of the 75 faculty members were under a department named anthropology.

Some consider anthropology to have become a tool for colonizers, who study their subjects to gain a better understanding and control.

=== 20th and 21st centuries ===
Anthropology, as a specialized field of academic study, developed significantly by the end of the 19th century.

Beginning in the early 20th century, the field saw rapid expansion, to the point where many of the world's higher education institutions typically included anthropology departments. Thousands of anthropology departments have come into existence, and the field has diversified from a few major subdivisions to dozens more. Practical anthropology, the use of anthropological knowledge and techniques to solve specific problems, has arrived; for example, the presence of buried victims might prompt the use of a forensic archaeologist to reconstruct the final scene. The field has seen rapid growth on a global scale as well; the International Union of Anthropological and Ethnological Sciences contains members from over 50 countries.

Since the work of Franz Boas and Bronisław Malinowski in the late 19th and early 20th centuries, social anthropology in Great Britain and cultural anthropology in the US have been distinguished from other social sciences by their emphasis on cross-cultural comparisons, long-term in-depth examination of context, and the importance they place on participant-observation or experiential immersion in the area of research. Cultural anthropology, in particular, has emphasized cultural relativism, holism, and the use of findings to frame cultural critiques. This has been particularly prominent in the United States, from Boas' arguments against 19th-century racial ideology, through Margaret Mead's advocacy for gender equality and sexual liberation, to current criticisms of post-colonial oppression and promotion of multiculturalism. Ethnography is one of its primary research designs as well as the text that is generated from anthropological fieldwork.

In Great Britain and the Commonwealth countries, the British tradition of social anthropology tends to dominate. In the United States, anthropology has traditionally been divided into the four field approach developed by Franz Boas in the early 20th century: biological or physical anthropology; social, cultural, or sociocultural anthropology; archaeological anthropology; and linguistic anthropology. These fields frequently overlap but tend to use different methodologies and techniques.

European countries with overseas colonies tended to practice more ethnology (a term coined and defined by Adam F. Kollár in 1783). It is sometimes referred to as sociocultural anthropology in parts of the world influenced by the European tradition.

== Fields ==
Anthropology is a global discipline involving the humanities, social sciences, and natural sciences. Anthropology builds upon knowledge from natural sciences, including the discoveries about the origin and evolution of Homo sapiens, human physical traits, human behavior, the variations among different groups of humans, how the evolutionary past of Homo sapiens has influenced its social organization and culture, and from social sciences, including the organization of human social and cultural relations, institutions, social conflicts, etc. Early anthropology originated in Classical Greece and Persia and studied and tried to understand observable cultural diversity. As such, anthropology has been central in the development of several new (late 20th century) interdisciplinary fields such as cognitive science, global studies, and various ethnic studies.

According to Clifford Geertz,

...anthropology is perhaps the last of the great nineteenth-century conglomerate disciplines still, for the most part, organizationally intact. Long after natural history, moral philosophy, philology, and political economy have dissolved into their specialized successors, it has remained a diffuse assemblage of ethnology, human biology, comparative linguistics, and prehistory, held together mainly by the vested interests, sunk costs, and administrative habits of academia, and by a romantic image of comprehensive scholarship.

Sociocultural anthropology has been heavily influenced by structuralist and postmodern theories, as well as a shift toward the analysis of modern societies. During the 1970s and 1990s, there was an epistemological shift away from the positivist traditions that had largely informed the discipline. During this shift, enduring questions about the nature and production of knowledge came to occupy a central place in cultural and social anthropology. In contrast, archaeology and biological anthropology remained largely positivist.

=== Sociocultural ===
Sociocultural anthropology draws together the principal axes of cultural anthropology and social anthropology. Cultural anthropology is the comparative study of the manifold ways in which people make sense of the world around them. In contrast, social anthropology is the study of the relationships among individuals and groups. Cultural anthropology is more related to philosophy, literature, and the arts (how one's culture affects the experience for self and group, contributing to a more complete understanding of the people's knowledge, customs, and institutions), while social anthropology is more related to sociology and history. In that, it helps develop an understanding of social structures, typically of others and other populations (such as minorities, subgroups, dissidents, etc.). There is no hard-and-fast distinction between them, and these categories overlap to a considerable degree.

Inquiry in sociocultural anthropology is guided in part by cultural relativism, the attempt to understand other societies in terms of their own cultural symbols and values. Accepting other cultures in their own terms moderates reductionism in cross-cultural comparison. This project is often accommodated in the field of ethnography. Ethnography can refer to both a methodology and the product of ethnographic research, i.e., an ethnographic monograph. As a methodology, ethnography is based upon long-term fieldwork within a community or other research site. Participant observation is one of the foundational methods of social and cultural anthropology. Ethnology involves the systematic comparison of different cultures. The process of participant observation can be especially helpful for understanding a culture from an emic (conceptual, vs. etic, or technical) point of view.

The study of kinship and social organization is a central focus of sociocultural anthropology, as kinship is a human universal. Sociocultural anthropology also covers economic and political organization, law and conflict resolution, patterns of consumption and exchange, material culture, technology, infrastructure, gender relations, ethnicity, childrearing and socialization, religion, myth, symbols, values, etiquette, worldview, sports, music, nutrition, recreation, games, food, festivals, and language- which is also the object of study in linguistic anthropology.

Comparison across cultures is a key methodological element in sociocultural anthropology, including the industrialized (and de-industrialized) West. The Standard Cross-Cultural Sample (SCCS) includes 186 such cultures.

=== Biological ===
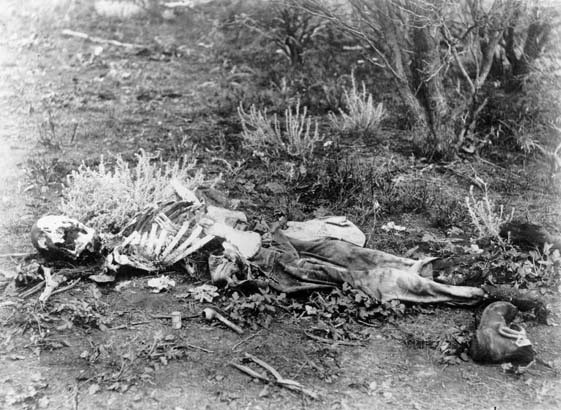
Forensic anthropologists can help identify skeletonized human remains, such as these found lying in scrub in Western Australia, c. 1900–1910.

Biological anthropology and physical anthropology are synonymous terms to describe anthropological research focused on the study of humans and other primates in their biological, evolutionary, and demographic dimensions. It examines the biological and social factors that have affected the evolution of humans and other primates, and that generate, maintain or change contemporary genetic and physiological variation. Subfields include forensic anthropology, paleoanthropology, dental anthropology, primatology, and human biology, among others.

Nineteenth- and twentieth-century America and Europe were formative periods for many scientific disciplines, and racism played a significant role in motivating certain avenues of research, including the early development of bioarchaeology. A major driver behind the field’s creation was the effort to “establish the intellectual superiority of the white race.” When scientists determined that the remains they were studying belonged to Indigenous, enslaved, or otherwise socially marginalized people, they often treated those individuals not as human beings but as scientific specimens. This racist foundation shaped attitudes for decades, reinforcing the belief among many anthropologists that they held inherent authority over the human remains and burial sites they encountered. Recognizing this history is crucial, as its effects persist today in the form of damaged evidence, ethical challenges, and harmful professional assumptions.

=== Archaeological ===
Archaeology is the study of the human past through its material remains. Artifacts, faunal remains, and human-altered landscapes are evidence of the cultural and material lives of past societies. Archaeologists examine material remains to deduce patterns of past human behavior and cultural practices. Ethnoarchaeology is a branch of archaeology that studies the practices and material remains of living human groups to understand better the evidence left behind by past human groups presumed to have lived in similar ways.

The Rosetta Stone was an example of ancient communication.

=== Linguistic ===
Linguistic anthropology (not to be confused with anthropological linguistics) seeks to understand the processes of human communications, verbal and non-verbal, variation in language across time and space, the social uses of language, and the relationship between language and culture. It is the branch of anthropology that brings linguistic methods to bear on anthropological problems, linking the analysis of linguistic forms and processes to the interpretation of sociocultural processes. Linguistic anthropologists often draw on related fields including sociolinguistics, pragmatics, cognitive linguistics, semiotics, discourse analysis, and narrative analysis.

=== Ethnography ===
Ethnography is a method of analyzing social or cultural interaction. It often involves participant observation, though an ethnographer may also draw from texts written by participants in social interactions. Ethnography views first-hand experience and social context as important.

Tim Ingold distinguishes ethnography from anthropology, arguing that anthropology seeks to construct general theories of human experience applicable to novel settings, while ethnography concerns itself with fidelity. He argues that the anthropologist must make his writing consistent with their understanding of literature and other theory but notes that ethnography may be of use to the anthropologists and the fields inform one another.

== Key topics by field: sociocultural ==
=== Art, media, music, dance, and film ===
==== Art ====
One of the central problems in the anthropology of art concerns the universality of 'art' as a cultural phenomenon. Several anthropologists have noted that the Western categories of 'painting', 'sculpture', or 'literature', conceived as independent artistic activities, do not exist, or exist in a significantly different form, in most non-Western contexts. To solve this, anthropologists of art have focused on formal features in objects which, without exclusively being 'artistic', have certain evident 'aesthetic' qualities. Boas' Primitive Art, Claude Lévi-Strauss' The Way of the Masks (1982) or Geertz's 'Art as Cultural System' (1983) are examples in this trend of transforming the anthropology of 'art' into an anthropology of culturally specific 'aesthetics'.

==== Media ====
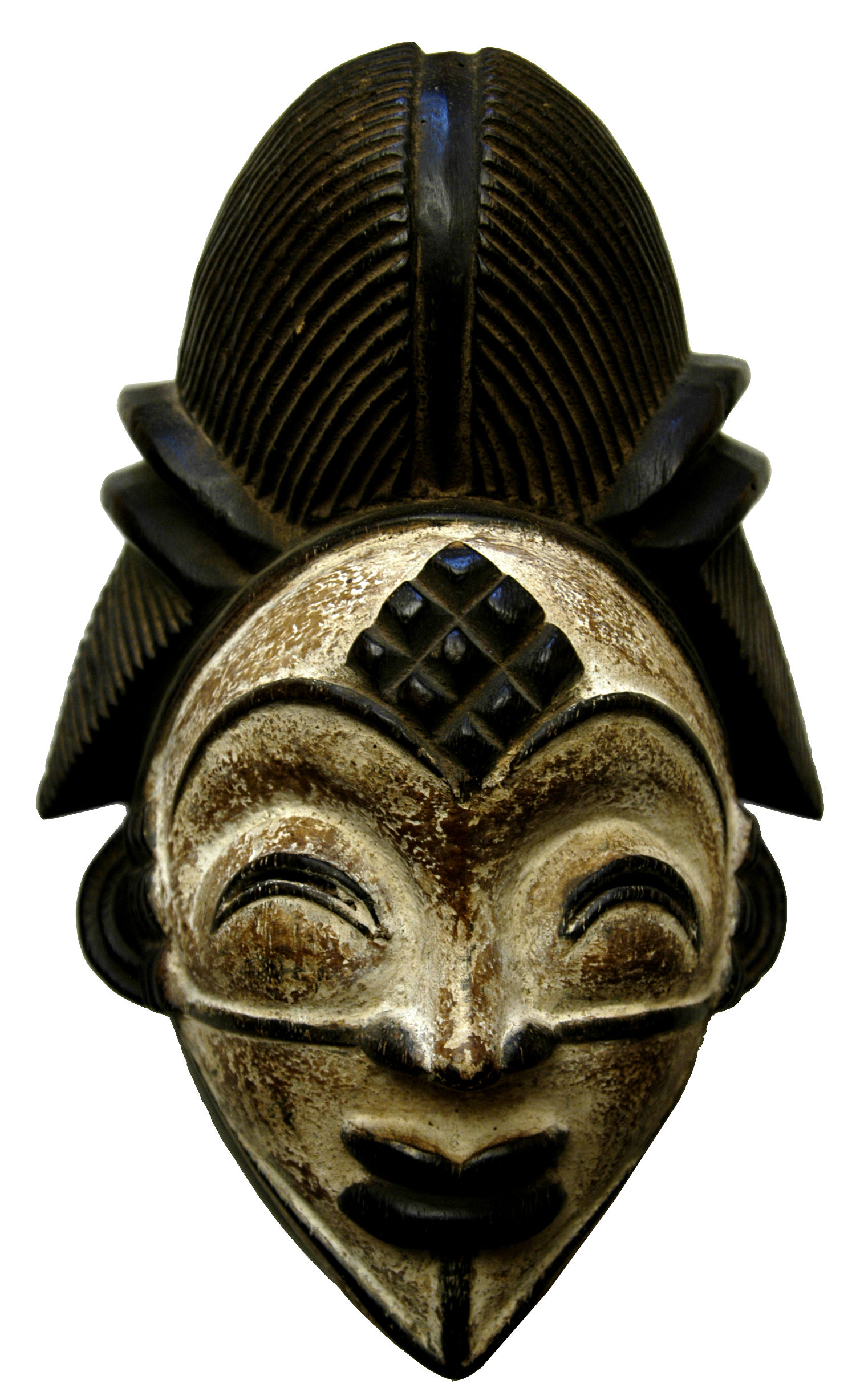
A Punu tribe mask, Gabon, Central Africa

Media anthropology emphasizes ethnographic studies as a means of understanding producers, audiences, and other cultural and social aspects of mass media. The types of ethnographic contexts explored range from media production (e.g., ethnographies of newspaper newsrooms, journalists in the field, and film production) to media reception, following audiences in their everyday responses to media. Other types include cyber anthropology, a relatively new area of internet research, as well as ethnographies of other areas of research that involve media, such as development work, social movements, or health education. This is in addition to many classic ethnographic contexts, where media such as radio, the press, new media, and television have started to make their presences felt since the early 1990s.

==== Music ====
Ethnomusicology is an academic field encompassing various approaches to the study of music (broadly defined) that emphasize its cultural, social, material, cognitive, biological, and other dimensions or contexts, rather than its isolated sound component or any particular repertoire.

Ethnomusicology can be applied across a wide range of fields, including teaching, politics, and cultural anthropology. While the origins of ethnomusicology date back to the 18th and 19th centuries, it was formally termed "ethnomusicology" by Dutch scholar Jaap Kunst c. 1950. Later, the influence of study in this area spawned the creation of the periodical Ethnomusicology and the Society of Ethnomusicology.

==== Visual ====
Visual anthropology is concerned, in part, with the study and production of ethnographic photography, film, and, since the mid-1990s, new media. While the term is sometimes used interchangeably with ethnographic film, visual anthropology also encompasses the anthropological study of visual representation, including areas such as performance, museums, art, and the production and reception of mass media. Visual representations from all cultures, such as sandpaintings, tattoos, sculptures and reliefs, cave paintings, scrimshaw, jewelry, hieroglyphs, paintings, and photographs are included in the focus of visual anthropology.

=== Economic, political, economic, applied, and development ===
==== Economic ====
Economic anthropology seeks to explain human economic behavior across the widest historical, geographic, and cultural scope. It has a complex relationship with the discipline of economics, which it is highly critical of. Its origins as a sub-field of anthropology begin with the Polish-British founder of anthropology, Bronisław Malinowski, and his French compatriot, Marcel Mauss, on the nature of gift-giving exchange (or reciprocity) as an alternative to market exchange. Economic anthropology remains, for the most part, focused upon exchange. The school of thought derived from Marx and known as political economy focuses on production, in contrast. Economic anthropologists have abandoned the primitivist niche they were relegated to by economists, and have now turned to examine corporations, banks, and the global financial system from an anthropological perspective.

==== Political economy ====
Political economy in anthropology is the application of the theories and methods of historical materialism to the traditional concerns of anthropology, including, but not limited to, non-capitalist societies. Political economy introduced questions of history and colonialism to ahistorical anthropological theories of social structure and culture. Three main areas of interest rapidly developed. The first of these areas concerned the "pre-capitalist" societies subject to evolutionary "tribal" stereotypes. Sahlin's work on hunter-gatherers as the "original affluent society" did much to dissipate that image. The second area was concerned with the vast majority of the world's population at the time, the peasantry, many of whom were involved in complex revolutionary wars, such as in Vietnam. The third area was on colonialism, imperialism, and the creation of the capitalist world-system. More recently, these political economists have more directly addressed issues of industrial (and post-industrial) capitalism around the world.

==== Applied ====
Applied anthropology refers to the application of the method and theory of anthropology to the analysis and solution of practical problems. It is a "complex of related, research-based, instrumental methods which produce change or stability in specific cultural systems through the provision of data, initiation of direct action, and/or the formulation of policy". Applied anthropology is the practical side of anthropological research; it includes researcher involvement and activism within the participating community. It is closely related to development anthropology (distinct from the more critical anthropology of development).

==== Development ====
Anthropology of development tends to view development from a critical perspective. The issues addressed, and the implications for the approach, involve pondering why, if a key development goal is to alleviate poverty, poverty is increasing. Why is there such a gap between plans and outcomes? Why are those working in development so willing to disregard history and the lessons it might offer? Why is development so externally driven rather than having an internal basis? In short, why does so much planned development fail?

=== Kinship, feminism, gender, and sexuality ===
==== Kinship ====
Kinship can refer both to the study of the patterns of social relationships in one or more human cultures, or it can refer to the patterns of social relationships themselves. Over its history, anthropology has developed several related concepts and terms, such as "descent", "descent groups", "lineages", "affines", "cognates", and even "fictive kinship". Broadly, kinship patterns may be considered to include people related both by descent (one's social relations during development) and also relatives by marriage. Within kinship, you have two different families. People have their biological families, the people they share DNA with. This is called consanguinity or "blood ties". People can also have a chosen family in which they chose who they want to be a part of their family. In some cases, people are closer to their chosen family than to their biological families.

==== Feminist ====
Feminist anthropology is a four-field approach to anthropology (archeological, biological, cultural, linguistic) that seeks to reduce male bias in research findings, anthropological hiring practices, and the scholarly production of knowledge. Anthropology often engages with feminists from non-Western traditions, whose perspectives and experiences can differ from those of white feminists of Europe, America, and elsewhere. From the perspective of the Western world, such 'peripheral' perspectives have historically been ignored, viewed only from an outsider's perspective, and regarded as less valid or less important than knowledge from the Western world. Exploring and addressing that double bias against women from marginalized racial or ethnic groups is of particular interest in intersectional feminist anthropology.

Feminist anthropologists have stated that their publications have contributed to anthropology, along the way correcting against the systemic biases beginning with the "patriarchal origins of anthropology (and (academia)" and noted that from 1891 to 1930 doctorates in anthropology went to males more than 85%, more than 81% were under 35, and only 7.2% to anyone over 40 years old, thus reflecting an age gap in the pursuit of anthropology by first-wave feminists until later in life. This correction of systemic bias may include mainstream feminist theory, history, linguistics, archaeology, and anthropology. Feminist anthropologists are often concerned with the construction of gender across societies. Gender constructs are of particular interest in the study of sexism.

According to St. Clair Drake, Vera Mae Green was, until "[w]ell into the 1960s", the only African American female anthropologist who was also a Caribbeanist. She studied ethnic and family relations in the Caribbean and the United States, and thereby sought to improve the way black life, experiences, and culture were studied. However, Zora Neale Hurston, although often primarily considered to be a literary author, was trained in anthropology by Franz Boas, and published Tell my Horse about her "anthropological observations" of voodoo in the Caribbean (1938).

Feminist anthropology is inclusive of the anthropology of birth as a specialization, which is the anthropological study of pregnancy and childbirth within cultures and societies.

=== Medical, nutritional, psychological, cognitive, and transpersonal ===
==== Medical ====
Medical anthropology is an interdisciplinary field that studies "human health and disease, health care systems, and biocultural adaptation". It is believed that William Caudell was the first to discover the field of medical anthropology. Currently, research in medical anthropology is one of the main areas of growth in anthropology as a whole. It focuses on the following six basic fields:

- The development of systems of medical knowledge and medical care
- The patient-physician relationship
- The integration of alternative medical systems in culturally diverse environments
- The interaction of social, environmental, and biological factors that influence health and illness both in the individual and the community as a whole
- The critical analysis of interaction between psychiatric services and migrant populations ("critical ethnopsychiatry": Beneduce 2004, 2007)
- The impact of biomedicine and biomedical technologies in non-Western settings

Other subjects that have become central to medical anthropology worldwide are violence and social suffering (Farmer, 1999, 2003; Beneduce, 2010), as well as other issues that involve physical and psychological harm and suffering that are not a result of illness. On the other hand, some fields intersect with medical anthropology in research methodology and theoretical production, such as cultural psychiatry, transcultural psychiatry, and ethnopsychiatry.

==== Nutritional ====
Nutritional anthropology is a synthetic concept that examines the interplay among economic systems, nutritional status, and food security, and how changes in the former affect the latter. If economic and environmental changes in a community affect access to food, food security, and dietary health, then this interplay between culture and biology is in turn connected to broader historical and economic trends associated with globalization. Nutritional status affects overall health, work performance potential, and the potential for economic development (whether in terms of human development or traditional Western models) for any given group of people.

==== Psychological ====
Psychological anthropology is an interdisciplinary subfield of anthropology that studies the interaction of cultural and mental processes. This subfield tends to focus on ways in which humans' development and enculturation within a particular cultural group – with its own history, language, practices, and conceptual categories – shape processes of human cognition, emotion, perception, motivation, and mental health. It also examines how the understanding of cognition, emotion, motivation, and similar psychological processes inform or constrain our models of cultural and social processes.

==== Cognitive ====
Cognitive anthropology seeks to explain patterns of shared knowledge, cultural innovation, and transmission over time and space using the methods and theories of the cognitive sciences (especially experimental psychology and evolutionary biology) often through close collaboration with historians, ethnographers, archaeologists, linguists, musicologists and other specialists engaged in the description and interpretation of cultural forms. Cognitive anthropology is concerned with what people from different groups know and how that implicit knowledge shapes how they perceive and relate to the world around them.

==== Transpersonal ====
Transpersonal anthropology studies the relationship between altered states of consciousness and culture. As with transpersonal psychology, the field is much concerned with altered states of consciousness (ASC) and transpersonal experience. However, the field differs from mainstream transpersonal psychology in taking more cognizance of cross-cultural issues – for instance, the roles of myth, ritual, diet, and text in evoking and interpreting extraordinary experiences.

=== Political and legal ===
==== Political ====
Political anthropology concerns the structure of political systems, viewed in light of the structure of societies. Political anthropology developed as a discipline concerned primarily with politics in stateless societies, a new development that started from the 1960s, and is still unfolding: anthropologists started increasingly to study more "complex" social settings in which the presence of states, bureaucracies, and markets entered both ethnographic accounts and analysis of local phenomena. The turn towards complex societies meant that political themes were taken up at two main levels. Firstly, anthropologists continued to study political organization and political phenomena that lay outside the state-regulated sphere (as in patron-client relations or tribal political organization). Secondly, anthropologists gradually began to develop a disciplinary concern with states and their institutions (and with the relationship between formal and informal political institutions). An anthropology of the state has developed into a thriving field today. Geertz's comparative work on "Negara", the Balinese state, is an early, famous example.

==== Legal ====
Legal anthropology or anthropology of law specializes in "the cross-cultural study of social ordering". Earlier legal anthropological research often focused more narrowly on conflict management, crime, sanctions, or formal regulation. More recent applications include issues such as human rights, legal pluralism, and political uprisings.

==== Public ====
Public anthropology was created by Robert Borofsky, a professor at Hawaii Pacific University, to "demonstrate the ability of anthropology and anthropologists to address problems beyond the discipline effectively – illuminating larger social issues of our times as well as encouraging broad, public conversations about them with the explicit goal of fostering social change".

=== Nature, science, and technology ===
==== Cyborg ====
Cyborg anthropology originated as a sub-focus group within the American Anthropological Association's annual meeting in 1993. The sub-group was very closely related to STS and the Society for the Social Studies of Science. Donna Haraway's 1985 Cyborg Manifesto could be considered the founding document of cyborg anthropology, as it first explores the philosophical and sociological ramifications of the term. Cyborg anthropology studies humankind and its relations with the technological systems it has built, specifically modern systems that have reflexively shaped notions of what it means to be human.

==== Digital ====
Digital anthropology is the study of the relationship between humans and digital-era technology and extends to various areas where anthropology and technology intersect. It is sometimes grouped with sociocultural anthropology, and sometimes considered part of material culture. The field is new and thus has a variety of names and emphases. These include techno-anthropology, digital ethnography, cyberanthropology, and virtual anthropology.

==== Ecological ====
Ecological anthropology is defined as the "study of cultural adaptations to environments". The sub-field is also defined as, "the study of relationships between a population of humans and their biophysical environment". The focus of its research concerns "how cultural beliefs and practices helped human populations adapt to their environments, and how their environments change across space and time. The contemporary perspective of environmental anthropology, and arguably at least the backdrop, if not the focus of most of the ethnographies and cultural fieldworks of today, is political ecology. Many characterize this new perspective as more informed with culture, politics, and power, globalization, localized issues, century anthropology, and more. The focus and data interpretation is often used for arguments for/against or creation of policy, and to prevent corporate exploitation and damage of land. Often, the observer has become an active part of the struggle, either directly (organizing, participating) or indirectly (through articles, documentaries, books, ethnographies). Such is the case with environmental justice advocate Melissa Checker and her relationship with the people of Hyde Park.

==== Environment ====
Social sciences, such as anthropology, can offer interdisciplinary approaches to environmental issues. Professor Kay Milton, Director of the Anthropology research network in the School of History and Anthropology, describes anthropology as distinctive, with its most distinguishing feature being its interest in non-industrial indigenous and traditional societies. Anthropological theory is distinct because of the consistent presence of the concept of culture; not an exclusive topic but a central position in the study and a deep concern with the human condition. Milton describes three trends that are causing a fundamental shift in what characterizes anthropology: dissatisfaction with the cultural relativist perspective; a reaction against Cartesian dualisms, which obstruct progress in theory (the nature-culture divide); and, finally, increased attention to globalization (transcending the barriers of time/space).

Environmental discourse appears to be characterized by a high degree of globalization. (The troubling problem is borrowing non-indigenous practices and creating standards, concepts, philosophies, and practices in Western countries.) Anthropology and environmental discourse have now become a distinct position in anthropology as a discipline. Knowledge about diversities in human culture can be important in addressing environmental problems - anthropology is now a study of human ecology. Human activity is the most important agent in creating environmental change, a finding commonly found in human ecology, and it can claim a central place in how environmental problems are examined and addressed. Other ways anthropology contributes to environmental discourse include serving as theorists and analysts, or refining definitions to be more neutral/universal, etc. In the context of environmentalism, the term typically refers to the concern that the environment should be protected, particularly from the harmful effects of human activities. Environmentalism itself can be expressed in many ways. Anthropologists can open the doors of environmentalism by looking beyond industrial society, understanding the opposition between industrial and non-industrial relationships, knowing what ecosystem people and biosphere people are and are affected by, dependent and independent variables, "primitive" ecological wisdom, diverse environments, resource management, diverse cultural traditions, and knowing that environmentalism is a part of culture.

=== Historical ===
Ethnohistory is the study of ethnographic cultures and indigenous customs through the examination of historical records. It is also the study of the history of various ethnic groups that may or may not exist today. Ethnohistory uses both historical and ethnographic data as its foundation. Its historical methods and materials go beyond the standard use of documents and manuscripts. Practitioners recognize the utility of such source material as maps, music, paintings, photography, folklore, oral tradition, site exploration, archaeological materials, museum collections, enduring customs, language, and place names.

=== Religion ===
The anthropology of religion involves the study of religious institutions in relation to other social institutions, and the comparison of religious beliefs and practices across cultures. Modern anthropology assumes that there is complete continuity between magical thinking and religion, (Note: "It seems to be one of the postulates of modern anthropology that there is complete continuity between magic and religion. [note 35: See, for instance, RR Marett, Faith, Hope, and Charity in Primitive Religion, the Gifford Lectures (Macmillan, 1932), Lecture II, pp. 21 ff.] ... We have no empirical evidence at all that there ever was an age of magic that has been followed and superseded by an age of religion.") and that every religion is a cultural product created by the human community that worships it.

=== Urban ===
Urban anthropology is concerned with issues of urbanization, poverty, and neoliberalism. Ulf Hannerz quotes a 1960s remark that traditional anthropologists were "a notoriously agoraphobic lot, anti-urban by definition". Various social processes in the Western World as well as in the "Third World" (the latter being the habitual focus of attention of anthropologists) brought the attention of "specialists in 'other cultures'" closer to their homes. There are two main approaches to urban anthropology: examining the types of cities or examining the social issues within the cities. These two methods overlap and depend on each other. When defining different types of cities, one would use social, economic, and political factors to categorize them. By directly looking at the different social issues, one would also be studying how they affect the dynamic of the city.

== Key topics by field: archaeological and biological ==
=== Anthrozoology ===
Anthrozoology (also known as "human–animal studies") is the study of the interaction between living things. It is an interdisciplinary field that overlaps with several other disciplines, including anthropology, ethology, medicine, psychology, veterinary medicine, and zoology. A major focus of anthrozoologic research is the quantification of the positive effects of human-animal relationships on either party and the study of their interactions. It includes scholars from a diverse range of fields, including anthropology, sociology, biology, and philosophy. (Note: Anthrozoology should not be confused with "animal studies", which often refers to animal testing.)

=== Biocultural ===
Biocultural anthropology is the scientific exploration of the relationships between human biology and culture. Physical anthropologists throughout the first half of the 20th century viewed this relationship from a racial perspective; that is, from the assumption that typological human biological differences lead to cultural differences. After World War II the emphasis began to shift toward an effort to explore the role culture plays in shaping human biology.

=== Evolutionary ===
Evolutionary anthropology is the interdisciplinary study of the evolution of human physiology and human behavior and the relation between hominins and non-hominin primates. Evolutionary anthropology is based in natural science and social science, combining the human development with socioeconomic factors. Evolutionary anthropology is concerned with both the biological and cultural evolution of humans, past and present. It is based on a scientific approach, and brings together fields such as archaeology, behavioral ecology, psychology, primatology, and genetics. It is a dynamic and interdisciplinary field, drawing on many lines of evidence to understand the human experience, past and present.

=== Forensic ===
Forensic anthropology is the application of the science of physical anthropology and human osteology in a legal setting, most often in criminal cases where the victim's remains are in the advanced stages of decomposition. A forensic anthropologist can assist in the identification of deceased individuals whose remains are decomposed, burned, mutilated, or otherwise unrecognizable. The adjective "forensic" refers to the application of this subfield of science to a court of law.

=== Palaeoanthropology ===
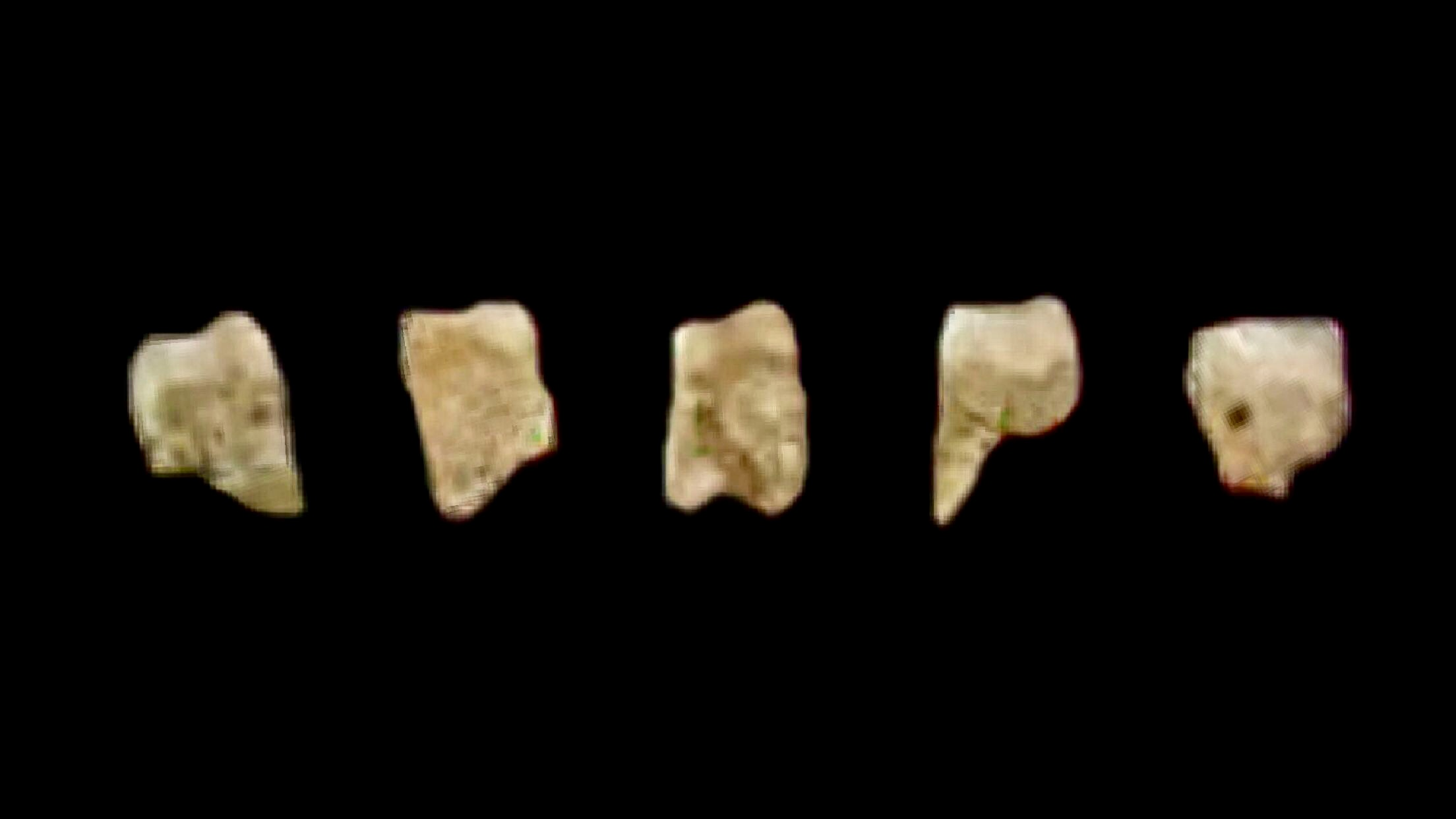
Five of the seven known fossil teeth of Homo luzonensis found in Callao Cave

Paleoanthropology combines the disciplines of paleontology and physical anthropology. It is the study of ancient humans, as evidenced by fossil hominid remains, such as petrifacted bones and footprints. The genetics and morphology of specimens are crucial to this field. Markers on specimens, such as enamel fractures and dental decay on teeth, can also give insight into the behavior and diet of past populations.

== Organizations ==
Contemporary anthropology is an established science with academic departments at most universities and colleges. The largest organization of anthropologists is the American Anthropological Association (AAA), founded in 1903. Its members are anthropologists from around the globe.

In 1989, a group of European and American scholars in anthropology established the European Association of Social Anthropologists (EASA), which serves as a major professional organization for anthropologists working in Europe. The EASA seeks to advance the status of anthropology in Europe and to increase the visibility of marginalized anthropological traditions, thereby contributing to the project of a global or world anthropology.

Hundreds of other organizations exist in the various sub-fields of anthropology, sometimes divided up by nation or region, and many anthropologists work with collaborators in other disciplines, such as geology, physics, zoology, paleontology, anatomy, music theory, art history, sociology and so on, belonging to professional societies in those disciplines as well.

=== List of major organizations ===
- American Anthropological Association
- American Ethnological Society
- Asociación de Antropólogos Iberoamericanos en Red, AIBR
- Anthropological Society of London
- Center for World Indigenous Studies
- Ethnological Society of London
- European Association of Social Anthropologists
- Max Planck Institute for Evolutionary Anthropology
- Network of Concerned Anthropologists
- N.N. Miklukho-Maklai Institute of Ethnology and Anthropology
- Royal Anthropological Institute of Great Britain and Ireland
- Society for Anthropological Sciences
- Society for Applied Anthropology
- USC Center for Visual Anthropology

== Ethics ==
As the field has matured, it has debated and arrived at ethical principles aimed at protecting both the subjects of anthropological research and the researchers themselves, and professional societies have generated codes of ethics.

Anthropologists, like other researchers (especially historians and scientists engaged in field research), have over time assisted state policies and projects, especially colonialism.

Some commentators have contended:

- That the discipline grew out of colonialism, perhaps was in league with it, and derives some of its key notions from it, consciously or not. (See, for example, Gough, Pels, and Salemink, but cf. Lewis 2004).
- That ethnographic work is often ahistorical, writing about people as if they were "out of time" in an "ethnographic present" (Johannes Fabian, Time and Its Other).
- In his article "The Misrepresentation of Anthropology and Its Consequences," Herbert S. Lewis critiqued older anthropological works that presented other cultures as if they were strange and unusual. He argued that while those researchers' findings should not be discarded, the field should learn from its mistakes.

=== Cultural relativism ===
As part of their quest for scientific objectivity, present-day anthropologists typically advocate cultural relativism, which influences all subfields of anthropology. This is the notion that cultures should not be judged by another's values or viewpoints, but be examined dispassionately on their own terms. There should be no notions, in good anthropology, of one culture being better or worse than another culture.

Ethical commitments in anthropology include noticing and documenting genocide, infanticide, racism, sexism, mutilation (including circumcision and subincision), and torture. Topics like racism, slavery, and human sacrifice attract anthropological attention and theories ranging from nutritional deficiencies, to genes, to acculturation, to colonialism, have been proposed to explain their origins and continued recurrences.

To illustrate the depth of an anthropological approach, one can take just one of these topics, such as racism, and find thousands of anthropological references spanning all major and minor subfields.

=== Military involvement ===
Anthropologists' involvement with the U.S. government, in particular, has caused bitter controversy within the discipline. Franz Boas publicly objected to US participation in World War I, and after the war, he published a brief exposé and condemnation of the participation of several American archaeologists in espionage in Mexico under their cover as scientists.

But by the 1940s, many of Boas' anthropologist contemporaries were active in the Allied war effort against the Axis powers (Nazi Germany, Fascist Italy, and Imperial Japan). Many served in the armed forces, while others worked in intelligence (for example, the Office of Strategic Services and the Office of War Information). At the same time, David H. Price's work on American anthropology during the Cold War provides detailed accounts of the pursuit and dismissal of several anthropologists from their jobs based on communist sympathies.

Attempts to accuse anthropologists of complicity with the CIA and government intelligence activities during the Vietnam War years have turned up little. Many anthropologists (students and teachers) were active in the anti-war movement. Numerous resolutions condemning the war in all its aspects were passed overwhelmingly at the annual meetings of the American Anthropological Association (AAA).

Professional anthropological bodies often object to the use of anthropology for the benefit of the state. Their codes of ethics or statements may proscribe anthropologists from giving secret briefings. The Association of Social Anthropologists of the UK and Commonwealth (ASA) has called certain scholarship ethically dangerous. The "Principles of Professional Responsibility" issued by the American Anthropological Association and amended through November 1986 stated that "in relation with their own government and with host governments ... no secret research, no secret reports or debriefings of any kind should be agreed to or given." The current "Principles of Professional Responsibility" does not make explicit mention of ethics surrounding state interactions.

Anthropologists, along with other social scientists, were working with the US military as part of the US Army's strategy in Afghanistan. The Christian Science Monitor reports that "Counterinsurgency efforts focus on better grasping and meeting local needs" in Afghanistan, under the Human Terrain System (HTS) program; in addition, HTS teams are working with the US military in Iraq. In 2009, the American Anthropological Association's Commission on the Engagement of Anthropology with the US Security and Intelligence Communities (CEAUSSIC) released its final report concluding, in part, that:

When ethnographic investigation is determined by military missions, not subject to external review, where data collection occurs in the context of war, integrated into the goals of counterinsurgency, and in a potentially coercive environment – all characteristic factors of the HTS concept and its application – it can no longer be considered a legitimate professional exercise of anthropology. In summary, while we stress that constructive engagement between anthropology and the military is possible, CEAUSSIC suggests that the AAA emphasize the incompatibility of HTS with disciplinary ethics and practice for job seekers and that it further recognize the problem of allowing HTS to define the meaning of 'anthropology' within DoD.

== Post-World War II developments ==
Before WWII, British 'social anthropology' and American 'cultural anthropology' were still distinct traditions. After the war, enough British and American anthropologists borrowed ideas and methodological approaches from one another that some began to speak of them collectively as 'sociocultural' anthropology.

=== Basic trends ===
Several characteristics tend to unite anthropological work. One of the central characteristics is that anthropology tends to provide a more holistic account of phenomena and is highly empirical. The quest for holism leads most anthropologists to study a particular place, problem, or phenomenon in detail, using a variety of methods, over a more extensive period than normal in many parts of academia.

In the 1990s and 2000s, calls for clarification of what constitutes a culture, of how an observer knows where their own culture ends and another begins, and other crucial topics in writing anthropology were heard. These dynamic relationships between what can be observed on the ground and what can be inferred from compiling many local observations remain fundamental to any anthropology, whether cultural, biological, linguistic, or archaeological.

Biological anthropologists are interested in both human variation and in the possibility of human universals (behaviors, ideas, or concepts shared by virtually all human cultures). They use many different methods of study. Still, modern population genetics, participant observation, and other techniques often take anthropologists "into the field," which means traveling to a community in its own setting, to do something called "fieldwork." On the biological or physical side, human measurements, genetic samples, and nutritional data may be gathered and published as articles or monographs.

Along with dividing up their project by theoretical emphasis, anthropologists typically divide the world into relevant time periods and geographic regions. Time periods are divided into relevant cultural traditions based on material culture, such as the Paleolithic and the Neolithic, which are of particular use in archaeology. Further cultural subdivisions by tool type, such as Oldowan, Mousterian, or Levalloisian, help archaeologists and other anthropologists understand major trends in the past. Anthropologists and geographers also share approaches to culture regions, since mapping cultures is central to both sciences. By making comparisons across cultural traditions (time-based) and cultural regions (space-based), anthropologists have developed various kinds of comparative method, a central part of their science.

=== Commonalities between fields ===
Because anthropology developed from so many different enterprises (see History of anthropology), including but not limited to fossil-hunting, exploring, documentary film-making, paleontology, primatology, antiquity dealings and curatorship, philology, etymology, genetics, regional analysis, ethnology, history, philosophy, and religious studies, it is difficult to characterize the entire field in a brief article, although attempts to write histories of the entire field have been made.

Some authors argue that anthropology originated and developed as the study of "other cultures", both in terms of time (past societies) and space (non-European/non-Western societies). For example, the classic of urban anthropology, Ulf Hannerz in the introduction to his seminal Exploring the City: Inquiries Toward an Urban Anthropology mentions that the "Third World" had habitually received most of attention; anthropologists who traditionally specialized in "other cultures" looked for them far away and started to look "across the tracks" only in late 1960s.

Now there exist many works focusing on peoples and topics very close to the author's "home". It is also argued that other fields of study, like History and Sociology, on the contrary focus disproportionately on the West.

In France, the study of Western societies has been traditionally left to sociologists, but this is increasingly changing, starting in the 1970s from scholars like Isac Chiva and journals like Terrain ("fieldwork") and developing with the center founded by Marc Augé (Le Centre d'anthropologie des mondes contemporains, the Anthropological Research Center of Contemporary Societies).

Since the 1980s, it has become common for social and cultural anthropologists to set ethnographic research in the North Atlantic region, frequently examining the connections between locations rather than limiting research to a single locale. There has also been a related shift toward broadening the focus beyond the daily life of ordinary people; increasingly, research is set in settings such as scientific laboratories, social movements, governmental and nongovernmental organizations, and businesses.

== See also ==
- Anthropology of human rights, a subfield of sociocultural and legal anthropology
- Anthropological science fiction – Genre of literature
- Christian anthropology, a sub-field of theology
- Circumscription theory – Political theory
- Culture – Social behavior and norms of a society
- Dual inheritance theory – Theory of human behavior
- Dental anthropology - a subfield of biological anthropology studying dental morphology and variation across human populations
- Emic and etic – Two kinds of anthropologic field research
- Engaged theory – Comprehensive critical theory
- Ethnobiology – Study of how living things are used by human cultures
- Human behavioral ecology – Study of human behavior and cultural diversity
- Human ethology – Study of human behavior
- Human Relations Area Files – International nonprofit membership organization
- Intangible cultural heritage – Type of cultural heritage
- Origins of society – Theories of social origins
- Philosophical anthropology, a subfield of philosophy
- Prehistoric medicine – Medicine in the time before the invention of writing
- Qualitative research – Form of research

=== Lists ===
- Outline of anthropology – Overview of and topical guide to anthropology
- List of indigenous peoples
- List of anthropologists
