= Asia Catalyst =

Asia Catalyst is an Asian independent organization that promotes civil society and advances the right to health for marginalized groups in Asia. Since its founding in 2006 by Sara L.M. Davis, the organization has opened offices in New York, United States; Beijing, China, and Bangkok, Thailand. It has also established 200 communities in 11 countries.

== Focus on marginalized groups ==
Asia Catalyst works with community-based organizations (CBOs) from marginalized groups that work on the right to health. Its partners come from communities that often experience severe and systemic rights violations, and are unable to or unaware of how to conduct effective advocacy around these issues. Partner groups include people living with HIV (PLHIV) and hepatitis, lesbian, gay, bisexual, and transgender (LGBT+) people and men who have sex with men (MSM), sex workers, and people who use drugs.

=== Definition of a CBO ===
Asia Catalyst defines a community-based organization (CBO) as a civil society group that operates within a specific community or groups of communities. Asia Catalyst works only with CBOs that represent marginalized communities. It requires that partner organizations have at least one member of the marginalized community in a decision-making position within the organization. This is meant to "ensure that the voices of marginalized communities are heard, and that Asia Catalyst's work focuses on the real, and most pressing, rights violations experienced."

=== Partner geography ===
Over the course of Asia Catalyst's history, it has partnered with hundreds of CBOs in 11 Asian countries, including Cambodia, China, Myanmar, Thailand, Vietnam, Nepal, The Philippines, Indonesia, Malaysia, and Papua New Guinea.

== Programs ==
Asia Catalyst supports civil society development and empowerment through tailored capacity building, research, and advocacy on issues of most concern to marginalized communities in Asia.

Asia Catalyst uses an innovative responsive model to "ensure community voice and need is at the heart of all programming." It incorporates a training-of-trainers methodology into all long-term programs to ensure sustainability, and continuously evaluates and adjusts its program approach to maximize impact and quality.

Asia Catalyst has four main program areas: CBO Catalyst, Regional Rights Training, tailored coaching, and advocacy.

=== CBO Catalyst ===
Asia Catalyst believes that community based organizations (CBOs) are best positioned to conduct their own advocacy as they have a unique understanding of the circumstances in which they work and the communities they represent.

Asia Catalyst’s seminal program, the CBO Catalyst, is a capacity building program for CBO leaders from marginalized groups in Asia. Over the course of one year, Asia Catalyst convenes a group of CBO leaders for capacity building workshops that merge organizational management skills with rights-based advocacy. Participants form lasting coalitions and conduct effective advocacy on their communities’ priority issues.

=== Regional Rights Training ===
Asia Catalyst's Regional Rights Training Program builds strong coalitions of like-minded CBOs through capacity building and implementation of human rights analysis, documentation and advocacy on a single thematic issues uniting CBOs across Asia.

In 2015 Asia Catalyst was supporting 16 representatives from eight CBOs from Cambodia, China, Myanmar, and Vietnam to work on ending discrimination in health care settings against people living with HIV (PLHIV) across the region.

=== Tailored coaching ===
Asia Catalyst provides specialized, issue-specific training to individual organizations and small groups with a specific skill-set need, such as strategic planning, fundraising, or volunteer management. Tailored Coaching for CBOs typically consist of two three-day workshops with Asia Catalyst over a period of 3–6 months. Between workshops, participant organizations complete assignments aimed at implementing the knowledge they have gained at workshops, with Asia Catalyst providing additional mentor support throughout the process.

Tailored coaching focuses especially on groups from marginalized communities, such as sex workers, drug users, LGBT people, and people living with HIV/AIDS. Much of the work has focused on grassroots groups in the People’s Republic of China, as well as groups in Korea, Thailand, and Myanmar (Burma). Asia Catalyst’s approach uses tools that have been developed in the field with input from their marginalized groups, and helps each group to develop strategic plans, project timelines, budgets, and volunteer management systems. Once this foundation is established, groups may be assisted in developing rights documentation and advocacy projects, working on such issues as discrimination, criminalization, and access to health services. Asia Catalyst trains groups to advocate with local and national officials, the United Nations, and to participate in international meetings.

=== Advocacy and research ===
Asia Catalyst partners with local groups in China to conduct qualitative research to document human rights abuses that affect the right to health. These reports draw on international human rights standards and local laws to make policy recommendations. Asia Catalyst’s advocacy work has focused on compensation for victims of the AIDS epidemic, as well as discrimination against people living with HIV/AIDS, and rights issues facing people who use drugs and sex workers.

Advocacy projects have been successful in achieving media attention. Asia Catalyst's December 2013 report on Custody and Education, an arbitrary detention system for female sex workers in China, was featured on the front page of the New York Times, as well as in prominent Asian and international newspapers including The Guardian, The Wall Street Journal, The South China Morning Post, and The Taipei Times. Its December 2014 research on the living conditions of transgender female sex workers in Beijing and Shanghai was also published in the LGBTQ Policy Journal at the Harvard Kennedy School.

== Administration ==
=== Leadership and board ===
Asia Catalyst is governed by a board of directors, which provides support and guidance for program direction and development. The board is led by Chair and Treasurer Yvonne Y. F. Chan, and includes Minky Worden of Human Rights Watch and Sara L.M. Davis, the organization's first executive director.

Asia Catalyst's executive director is Charmain Mohamed, an experienced human rights advocate and activist, who has lived and worked in Asia for most of 15 years. She has worked for the UN, Human Rights Watch and the Norwegian Refugee Council, both in emergency contexts and on long-term issues, in countries such as Indonesia, East Timor, Malaysia, Sri Lanka and, most recently in Palestine. She holds a Masters in Human Rights Law from the School of Oriental and African Studies in London and a BA (Hons.) in Southeast Asian Studies and Indonesian Language from the University of Hull. Charmain is fluent in English, Indonesian, and Malay.

=== Funding ===
Asia Catalyst, a 501(c)3 registered charity in the United States, undergoes an independent audit annually and files information returns with various governmental regulatory agencies. The organization’s resources come from contributions from individuals, foundations, and government funding.

Among its most significant past and present supporters are the Open Society Foundations, The Levi Strauss Foundation, National Endowment for Democracy, the Swedish International Development Agency, the German Embassy in Beijing, UNAIDS, and the U.S. State Department Bureau of Democracy, Human Rights and Labor.
