= Inequality in Bolivia =

Though resource rich, Bolivia is one of the poorest countries in Latin America. In the 1980s the tin market collapsed, the currency dived, and inflation soared. Austerity measures restored some confidence, but at the cost of widening inequality. This was exacerbated when, at the behest of the US, coca growing, a prime source of income for the poor, was shut down. There are also tensions over natural gas deposits, perhaps Bolivia's last remaining resource. And while GDP and GNI have both grown significantly since 2000, severe disparities exist both regionally and ethnically. UNICEF reports that women and children are the most vulnerable group. In 2002, the percentage of the population living below the poverty line was 82% in rural areas and 54% in urban areas. The departments with the most poverty are Potosi, Chuquisaca and Pando, while Santa Cruz and Tarija have the least.

The World Bank's Gini coefficient indicates that income inequality in Bolivia, estimated on the basis of size-adjusted household data, increased by almost ten percentage points between 1992 (49.1) and 1997 (58.2), where a value of 100 percent corresponds to the maximum income inequality and a value of zero percent to the minimum. An increasingly unequal distribution of income is also recorded for the following years. This growth reaches its climax at the turn of the millennium, when 61.6 percent of total income was distributed unequally across households in Bolivia. However, the year 2000 also marks a remarkable turning point. For the following 18 years, the estimated inequality index shows decline without significant fluctuations and points to an actual income inequality of 42.2 percent in 2018. In summary, income inequality in Bolivia has decreased by 6.9 percent points for the period under consideration (1992–2018).

== Indigenous and Non-Indigenous Inequality ==
Bolivia is one of the most culturally diverse societies in Latin America, with approximately 35 different ethnic groups. Official figures from the Bolivian Population Census 2001 estimates that approximately 62% of the total population are indigenous in 2001.

However, this majority of the population remain highly marginalized in economic terms and continue to live in extreme poverty. In Bolivia, mean income per capita in indigenous households was about 300 Bolivian Bolivianos per month in 2001 compared with 480 Bolivian Bolivianos for non-indigenous households. This gap can partly be explained by the fact that the largest source of income among the non-indigenous is non-agricultural wages, while the most important source of income for indigenous families, is agricultural self-employment which tend to be lower on average. By factoring out the difference in income due to types of employment, indigenous families still receive lower average incomes compared to non-indigenous families even within each category of employment. It should also be noted that the differences in income might also be due to differences in worker characteristics. However, neither labour market experience nor female participation seems to drive the differences in incomes. Education has appeared to have the biggest correlation with the disparity in income.

== Ethnic Education Gap ==
The main social indicators (such as illiteracy rate, mother and child mortality; primary and secondary enrolment rates) also indicate that indigenous peoples have significantly less access to social services than non-indigenous peoples. While non-indigenous people (age 15 and older) completed on average 9.6 years of education, indigenous peoples only completed 5.9 years.

In spite of the significant progress Bolivia has made in enhancing access to education in terms of overall school enrolment rates in the last decade, a high drop-out rate, especially among indigenous children is responsible for a persistent education gap between the indigenous and non-indigenous, with 42.4% of indigenous students dropping out before completing primary school compared to only 17.6% of non-indigenous students.
