= Sara L.M. Davis =

Sara L.M. Davis, PhD ("Meg"), is a human rights advocate, author and researcher.

== Early life ==
Born in France, Davis speaks French, English, and Mandarin. She received her doctorate from University of Pennsylvania and held postdoctoral fellowships at Yale University and the University of California Los Angeles.

== Career ==
Davis is a professor at the Centre for Interdisciplinary Methodologies (CIM) at University of Warwick. She was previously senior researcher at the Graduate Institute of International and Development Studies in Geneva, where she co-founded the Digital Health and Rights Project, a participatory action research consortium of universities, health advocates, human rights lawyers, and networks of people living with HIV. She also previously taught courses on sexual violence in conflicts and emergencies at the Geneva Centre for Education and Research in Humanitarian Action. She was Senior Human Rights Advisor at The Global Fund to Fight AIDS, Tuberculosis and Malaria, where she led the process of establishing minimum human rights standards for grant agreements in 140 countries that receive Global Fund support; launched a human rights complaints procedure at the Global Fund Office of the Inspector General; and published and implemented grant guidance on funding human rights programs as part of Global Fund HIV, TB, Malaria and Health System Strengthening grants. Prior to joining the Global Fund she was the founder of Asia Catalyst, a nonprofit organizations that works with marginalized communities in East and Southeast Asia. Davis founded Asia Catalyst in 2006. Before that, she conducted research and advocacy for Human Rights Watch and Open Society Institute. Davis has worked on issues related to HIV/AIDS and human rights, police abuse, housing rights, environmental rights, and rule of law in China, Thailand, Burma, Cambodia and Indonesia. In 2026, Davis is working as a professor at the University of Warwick.

== Research ==
Davis is the author of numerous articles on Health and Human Rights, as well as two books: The Uncounted: Politics of Data in Global Health (Cambridge University Press, 2020) and Song and Silence: Ethnic Revival on China’s Southwest Borders, (Columbia University Press, 2005 and Silkworm Books, 2006). With Carmel Williams, she co-edited a special issue of Health and Human Rights on "Big data, technology, artificial intelligence and the right to health". Her articles have appeared in the Journal of the International AIDS Society, Health and Human Rights, Wall Street Journal Asia, International Herald Tribune, South China Morning Post, HIV Law and Policy Review, Harm Reduction Journal, and Modern China.
