= Otto Casmann =

German humanist (1562–1607)

- Born: 1562; Warburg, Germany
- Died: 1607 (aged 44–45); Stade, Germany

Education
- Education: University of Marburg; University of Helmstedt; University of Heidelberg

Philosophical work
- Era: Renaissance Humanism
- Main interests: Philosophy; Theology; Anthropology; Psychology
- Notable works: Psychologia Anthropologica (2 volumes)
- Notable ideas: Coined definition of anthropology

Otto Casmann (1562 – 1 August 1607) (also known by the Latinized name Casmannus) was a German humanist who converted from Catholicism to Protestantism as a young man.

== Biography ==
Casmann started studying philosophy at the University of Marburg in 1581 under the guidance of Rudolf Goclenius the Elder. From September 1582 he studied philosophy and theology at the University of Helmstedt, where he earned a Magister degree. In 1587, he enrolled at the University of Heidelberg.

Casmann started teaching at Helmstedt, where he gave lectures on logic in which he clearly spoke out against the teachings of the Aristotelian system. In 1589, Casmann joined the Schüttorf Trivial School, which in 1591 was moved to Steinfurt and expanded to the academic Gymnasium Illustre. At Steinfurt he taught philosophy and anthropology. In 1594, Casmann obtained an appointment for the post of rector in Stade, where the City Council had set up a Gymnasium. In Stade, Casmann taught philosophy and theology, specializing in logic and natural philosophy.

Otto Casmann died on 1 August 1607 in Stade when he was 45 years old. He was survived by his wife and three daughters.

== Anthropology and psychology ==
Casmann is important to the history of anthropology and psychology. He began the separation of these two subjects from the Aristotelian framework of metaphysics, becoming a classical representative of the secularization of science in the early modern period. During his time at Steinfurt he produced the work Psychologia Anthropologica, sive doctrina animae Humanae (Hanau, 1594). There he consolidated the use of the term "anthropology" coined by Magnus Hundt (1449-1519). During his time in Stade, he wrote the second volume of Psychologia Anthropologica (Hanau, 1596) in which he described the construction of the human body. In 1594, Casmann defined anthropology as "the doctrine of human nature. Human nature is an essence partaking of two worlds, the spiritual and the corporeal, yet united in one vehicle." This definition is still considered valid today.
