= Documentary analysis =

Documentary analysis (also document analysis) is a type of qualitative research in which documents are reviewed by the analyst to assess an appraisal theme. Dissecting documents involves coding content into subjects like how focus group or interview transcripts are investigated. A rubric can likewise be utilized to review or score a document.

== Applications ==
=== Requirements definition ===
Document analysis can be used to accumulate requirements amid for a project. It collects available documents of related business procedures or systems and attempts to extract relevant data. Requirements can also be extracted from stakeholders via questionnaires, interviews, or focus groups.

== See also ==
- Content analysis
- Focus Groups
- Semiotics
