= Moral perception =

Moral perception is a term used in ethics and moral psychology to denote the discernment of the morally salient qualities in particular situations. Moral perceptions are argued to be necessary to moral reasoning (see practical reason), the deliberation of what is the right thing to do. Moral perception is variously conceptualized by Aristotle, Hannah Arendt, and Martha C. Nussbaum. Lawrence Blum (1994) distinguishes moral perception from moral judgment. Whereas a person's judgment about what the moral course of action would be is the result of a conscious deliberation, the basis for that process is the perception of aspects of one's situation, which is different for each person. Moral perceptions are also particular in nature.

Empirical research in moral psychology suggests that people are capable of rapidly - perhaps even subconsciously - detecting the moral qualities of situations and stimuli, however the interpretation of some of this research has been contested on methodological grounds.
