= Claim (philosophy) =

A claim is a substantive statement about a thing, such as an idea, event, individual, or belief. Its truth or falsity is open to debate. Arguments or beliefs may be offered in support, and criticisms and challenges of affirming contentions may be offered in rebuttal.

Philosophical claims are often categorized as either conceptual or empirical. Conceptual claims rely on existing concepts, such as colors or objects, and cannot be answered with direct facts; empirical claims are backed by scientific analysis and can be answered given direct facts. The conceptual claim, "That action is wrong", is debatable and requires extensive arguments to support. Empirical claims like "There will be snow in Washington tomorrow" can be proven given statistics and empirical data.

== Etymology ==
The term "claim" originates from the Latin word "clamare" meaning to cry out or shout. A claim may act as a noun or a verb. As a transitive verb, a claim asserts truth in an argument. A claim is considered a common noun when referred to as the statement itself.

== History ==
Philosophers have argued claims for thousands of years. Topics such as the origins of creation were popular amongst Greek philosophers like Anaximander, who claimed that the Earth lay at the center of the universe because there was no reason it should not do. These Western philosophers spread influence from Ancient Greece into the Roman Empire, then from Western Europe to the Americas and elsewhere. Medieval scholastic philosopher Peter Abelard claims that universals (shared qualities) are mental constructs and therefore entirely man-made. Throughout the timeline of Western philosophy, claims expand the understanding of fundamental concepts like communication and human thought.

Modern philosophers like Stephen Toulmin expand on claims through argumentation theory. Toulmin's method of argumentation begins with a claim and involves backing, warrants, qualifiers, and grounds to support a good argument and logical reasoning.

== See also ==
- Proposition
- Truth claim
- Warrant
