= Sociocultural anthropology =

An explanation of what comprises this branch of anthropology

Sociocultural anthropology is a term used to refer to social anthropology and cultural anthropology together. It is one of the four main branches of anthropology. Sociocultural anthropologists focus on the study of society and culture, although often interested in cultural diversity and universalism.

Sociocultural anthropologists recognise a change in the nature of the field: that a previous focus on traditional tribal perspectives has shifted to a contemporary understanding; that methodologies have altered, accordingly; that the discipline continues to evolve with that of society; and that globalisation has contributed to the changing influence of the state on individuals and their interactions.

== Overview ==
The term cultural anthropology is generally applied to ethnographic works that are holistic in approach. Its principal focus is the study of how culture affects individual experience with the aim of providing comprehensive understanding of the knowledge, customs, and institutions of a people. Cultural anthropology focuses on how individuals make sense of the world around them using the knowledge, beliefs, morals, arts, laws, and customs of groups.

Social anthropology is a term applied to ethnographic works that attempt to isolate a particular system of social relations, such as those that comprise domestic life, economy, law, politics, or religion; give analytical priority to the organisational bases of social life; and attend to cultural phenomena as somewhat secondary to the main issues of social scientific inquiry.

Sociocultural anthropology, which is understood to include linguistic anthropology, is concerned with the difference and similarity within and between human populations. The discipline arose through the expansion of European colonial empires, giving rise to theories and practices that have undergone challenges and reformulations with the advent of decolonisation. Such considerations have re-emerged as transnational processes and challenged the centrality of the nation-state in favor of theories about culture and power. New challenges have emerged as public debates about multiculturalism and the increasing use of cultural concepts within the field of anthropology.

== History ==
The synergy of sociology and anthropology was initially developed during the early 1920s by European scholars. Both disciplines shared a common search for a science of society. During the 20th century, however, the disciplines diverged as cultural studies began to emphasize the geographical and methodological underpinnings in an attempt for a more holistic understanding.

=== 1920–1960 ===
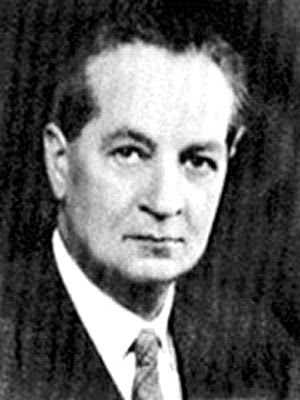
Alfred Radcliffe-Brown

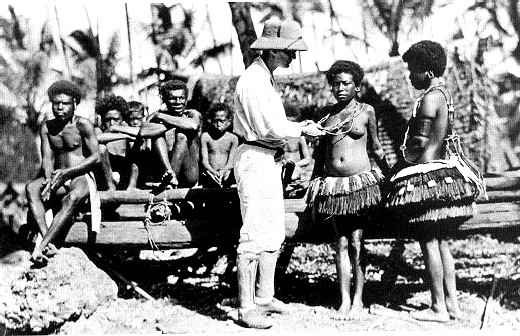
Bronisław Malinowski among a Trobriand Island tribe in 1918

'Social' and 'cultural' anthropology were developed in the 1920s. They were associated with the social sciences and linguistics rather than the human biology and archaeology studied in anthropology. Specialists in the respective fields of social and cultural anthropology were elemental in the foundations of the later developed synergy. Alfred Radcliffe-Brown and Bronisław Malinowski marked the point of differentiation between social and cultural anthropology in 1930, evident in texts from this period.

In the 1930s and '40s, an influx of monographs and comparative studies of 'tribal societies' emerged. Meyer Fortes and E. E. Evans-Pritchard described and classified African societies in African Political Systems (1940). Their comparative anthology aimed to provide a basis for sociological knowledge by classifying kin-based bands instead of relying on empirical observation.

Claude Lévi-Strauss used structuralism as a way to analyse cultural systems in terms of their structural relations, including that of kinship. In 1949, he attempted to classify marriage systems from diverse locations. He applied structuralism to anthropology to reaffirm the coexistence between the individual and society and to categorise information about cultural systems by the formal relationships among their elements. Structuralism remains a central concept in the study of sociocultural anthropology.

=== 1960–2000 ===
Before World War II, social and cultural anthropology were separate entities in the field. The war called upon anthropologists from all countries to assist in the war effort. Anthropologists were extensively involved in resettlement in Europe and in consulting issues of racial status in occupied areas. Ethical issues surrounding the Allies' involvement were topical among anthropologists, and institutional development and practiced methodologies were altered by programs in 'developing countries'. As developing countries grew independently, they grew a dislike for the apparent imperialistic nature of anthropological studies, which led to decline in the field in some countries. After the war, anthropologists combined ideas and methodologies to form the collective 'sociocultural anthropology'. Topical interests included religion, kinship, acculturation, function, and community studies.

During the 1970s, public spending was increased in most industrialised countries, which expanded social rights and also produced dramatic rises in wealth, living standards, and overall equity. This trend followed through until the 1990s. Although increased spending assisted in providing academic opportunity in anthropology during 1974–1990, after this period a steady decline in anthropology opportunity has been the continued trend. The drastic growth of students in Ph.D. and M.A. programmes, decrease of university and government funding, and downward shift in birth rates are contributors to anthropology's current state.

=== 2000–present ===
Traditional methodologies used in the study of sociocultural anthropology have changed, due to cultural shift. In today's society, individuals undergo daily routines that differ from those of previous decades, participating in minority groups within which only certain aspects relate to the broader national culture. Anthropologists are unable to receive a holistic ethnography, as individuals return to the private sphere after interacting within their minority groups. Impacts of globalisation, neoliberalism, and capitalism have contributed to the decline in anthropological field work.

The job market of the 2000s is centralised around income-generating occupations, which has reduced the number of university students in the social science fields. As a result, universities have reduced funding for many anthropological programmes. The 2008 financial crisis enhanced this trend. Decreased spending in the anthropological sector, in combination with an increase of university students in anthropology, have resulted in decreased job opportunities.

Sociocultural anthropological study of the 21st century produces facts created by the intersection of cultural classification systems and heterogenous and dynamic societies. The media have particularly contributed to this societal environment, as their influence produces accessibility for all to gather experience and evidence; however, charged political conditions sway social discourse. Anthropologists use theories such as structuralism to decipher epistemological obstacles. Considering that systems are defined by the laws of their constitutive elements rather than the content alone is a lens through which modern society is studied.

== Theoretical foundations ==
=== Concepts ===
To ethnographically study societies and cultures, sociocultural anthropology divides into 1) a broader national level and 2) a minority of subcultural groups. National culture is observed through formally organised institutions, including those of government, legal, and educational systems; economic institutions; religious and military organisations; and law enforcement. National achievements are influential on sociocultural integration, although this can be limited to upper class relevance only. Subcultural segments are groups of individuals within the national culture, observed through vertical lenses (differentiation because of national development) and horizontal lenses (class and occupational divisions structured by societal hierarchy).

==== Human migration ====
Within the field of anthropology, human migration—'the movement of persons away from their place of usual residence, either across an international border or within a state'— has been shown to have both a macro and a micro impact on society and its culture. The interplay among social, political, economic, demographic, cultural, and geographical factors remains central to the effect of the movement of individuals. Boas (1920) in his article The Methods of Ethnology states that it is migration and dissemination of peoples rather than evolution that provides the basis for ethnological research, as migration is accepted as the cause for similarities of languages and dissemination of ideas and inventions across continents. The process of migration is responsible for the carrying of culture whilst the adaptation of culture to societies in different environments.

==== Linguistics ====
The discipline of linguistics is interrelated with the study of society and culture. Both fields share a common intellectual origin in 19th century scholarship as archaeologists and early folklorists looked for origins of culture in folktales and shared memory. These early anthropologists narrowly focused on the influence of structural codes on distinctions among communities. Comparison of societies prompted early linguistic enquiries. In the 20th century, a distinction arose between linguistic anthropology and formal linguistics, with greater focus placed on the cultural and behavioral sides of language. Formal linguistics remains to be studied through a cognitive viewpoint. Linguistic anthropology, however, studies how language is used in the social and cultural life of people in different societies. Speech is used in societies as a system to indicate the series of certain events and how role relations effect such events.

==== Sociology ====
Sociocultural anthropology studies the interaction of different spheres and draws comparisons with alternative societies and cultures. Sociocultural anthropology is closely aligned with sociology sharing theoretical generalisation for social science and reflection of human lives. The two fields came to diverge in the 20th century as differences in research topics, geographic focus, and methodological emphasis arose. Sociocultural anthropology focuses on the study of broader political, ethical, and economic subjects within small-scale societies, whereas sociology focuses on societies as a whole. Sociologically trained ethnographers have less regard for anthropological theory and place greater emphasis on empirical data. Recently, the two fields have reconverged as globalisation has aligned subject ideas and methodologies.

=== Methodologies ===
The traditional anthropological research method is gathering what people say and do by initial participant observation. This is done through a synthesis of insider and outsider elements. Insider elements involve the field worker's learning what behaviour means to people. Outsider elements include direct observations and experiences, and making comparisons thereof with internal cultural customs and behaviours with alternate cultures. These observations are then transferred into a monograph of elements organised by importance and considered in relation to anthropological theories or questions. The process is controlled and a hypothesis is tested reporting results after every return. However, the process may be more fortuitous if unique or unexpected events occur and the writing process is extended to make sense of the various elements.

Since the 1960s, anthropologists have recognised the importance of collaboration through reflections on experiences in the field on relationships with informants and contexts in which material is gathered. These reflections provide for readers of ethnographic texts to better understand them as well as for anthropologists to work with more awareness of their own biases and emotions when writing, which in turn has led to advancements in the field of sociocultural anthropology.

Marxist and structuralist approaches include methods for gathering anthropological information that are challenged. The Marxist approach validates the need for conventional field work, exploring the intersection between empirical observation and theoretical frameworks with the aim of improving each. The structuralist approach is more concerned with theoretical structures.

== See also ==
- Kluckhohn and Strodtbeck's values orientation theory
