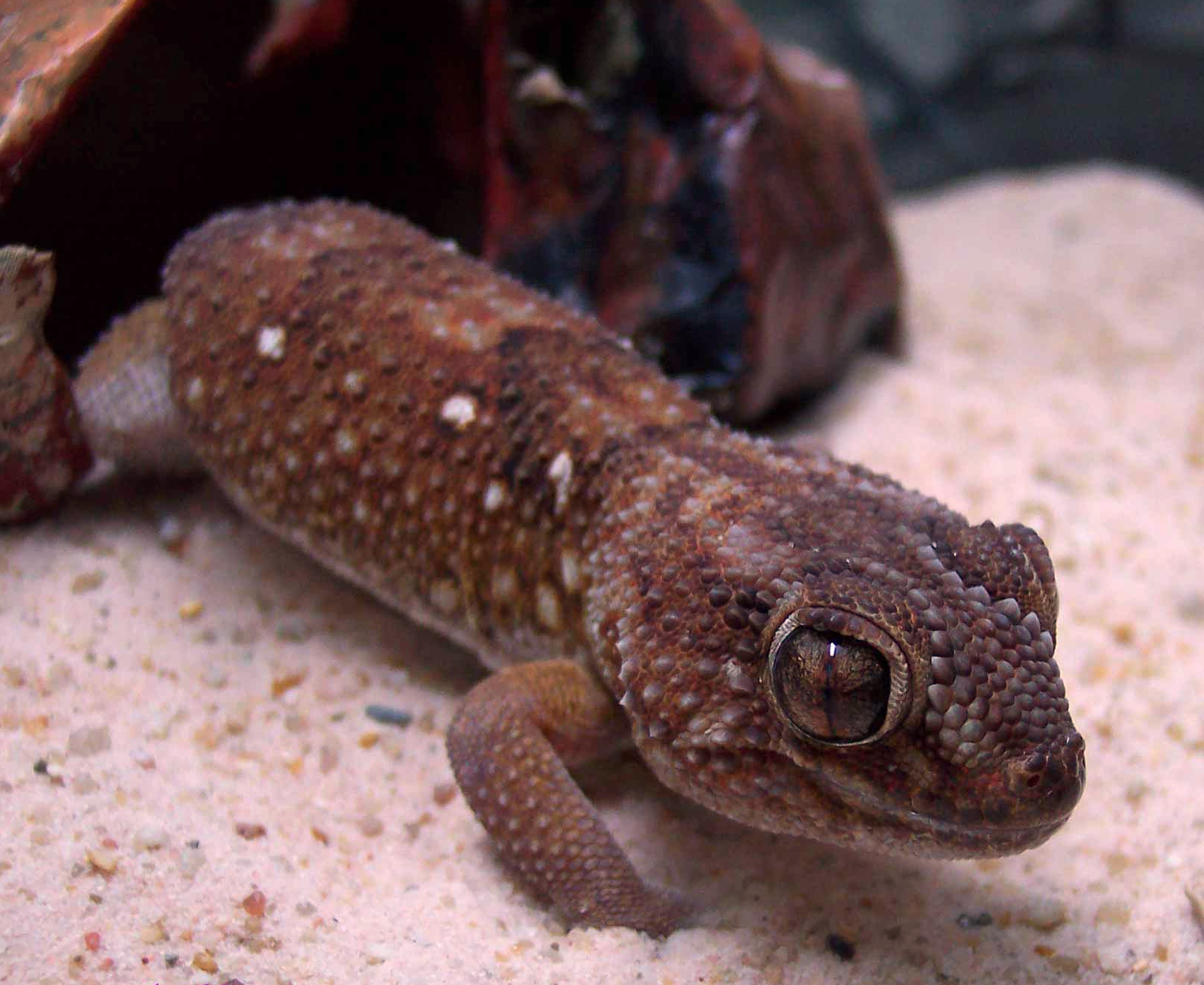
- Common giant ground gecko (Chondrodactylus angulifer)

Scientific classification
- Kingdom: Animalia
- Phylum: Chordata
- Class: Reptilia
- Order: Squamata
- Suborder: Gekkota
- Family: Gekkonidae
- Subfamily: Uroplatinae
- Genus: Chondrodactylus; W. Peters, 1870

Species
- 6, see text.

= Chondrodactylus =

Genus of lizards

Chondrodactylus is genus of geckos, lizards in the family Gekkonidae. The genus is commonly known as thick-toed geckos. Little is known of their biology.

== Species and subspecies ==
The following species and subspecies are recognized as being valid.

- Chondrodactylus angulifer W. Peters, 1870 – common giant ground gecko
  - Chondrodactylus angulifer angulifer W. Peters, 1870
  - Chondrodactylus angulifer namibensis Haacke, 1976
- Chondrodactylus bibronii (A. Smith, 1846) – Bibron's thick-toed gecko
- Chondrodactylus fitzsimonsi (Loveridge, 1947) – Fitzsimons's thick-toed gecko
- Chondrodactylus laevigatus Fischer, 1888 – Fischer's thick-toed gecko
- Chondrodactylus pulitzerae (Schmidt, 1933) – Pulitzer's thick-toed gecko
- Chondrodactylus turneri (Gray, 1864) – Turner's thick-toed gecko

Nota bene: A binomial authority in parentheses indicates that the species was originally described in a genus other than Chondrodactylus.
