= Bazley baronets =

Baronetcy in the Baronetage of the United Kingdom

- Escutcheon of the Bazley baronets of Hatherop
- Creation date: 1869
- Status: extant
- Motto: Finem respice, Consider the end

The Bazley Baronetcy, of Hatherop in the County of Gloucester, is a title in the Baronetage of the United Kingdom. It was created on 30 November 1869 for Thomas Bazley. He was a cotton spinner and also sat as Liberal Member of Parliament for Manchester from 1857 to 1880. He was succeeded by his son, the second Baronet. He was a justice of the peace, deputy lieutenant and high sheriff for Gloucestershire. On his death the title passed to his grandson, the third Baronet. As of 2007 the title is held by the latter's eldest son, the fourth Baronet, who succeeded in 1997.

== Bazley baronets, of Hatherop (1869) ==
- Sir Thomas Bazley, 1st Baronet (1797–1885)
- Sir Thomas Sebastian Bazley, 2nd Baronet (1829–1919)
- Sir Thomas Stafford Bazley, 3rd Baronet (1907–1997)
- Sir Thomas John Sebastian Bazley, 4th Baronet (born 1948)

The heir presumptive is the present holder's brother Anthony Martin Christopher Bazley (born 1958).
