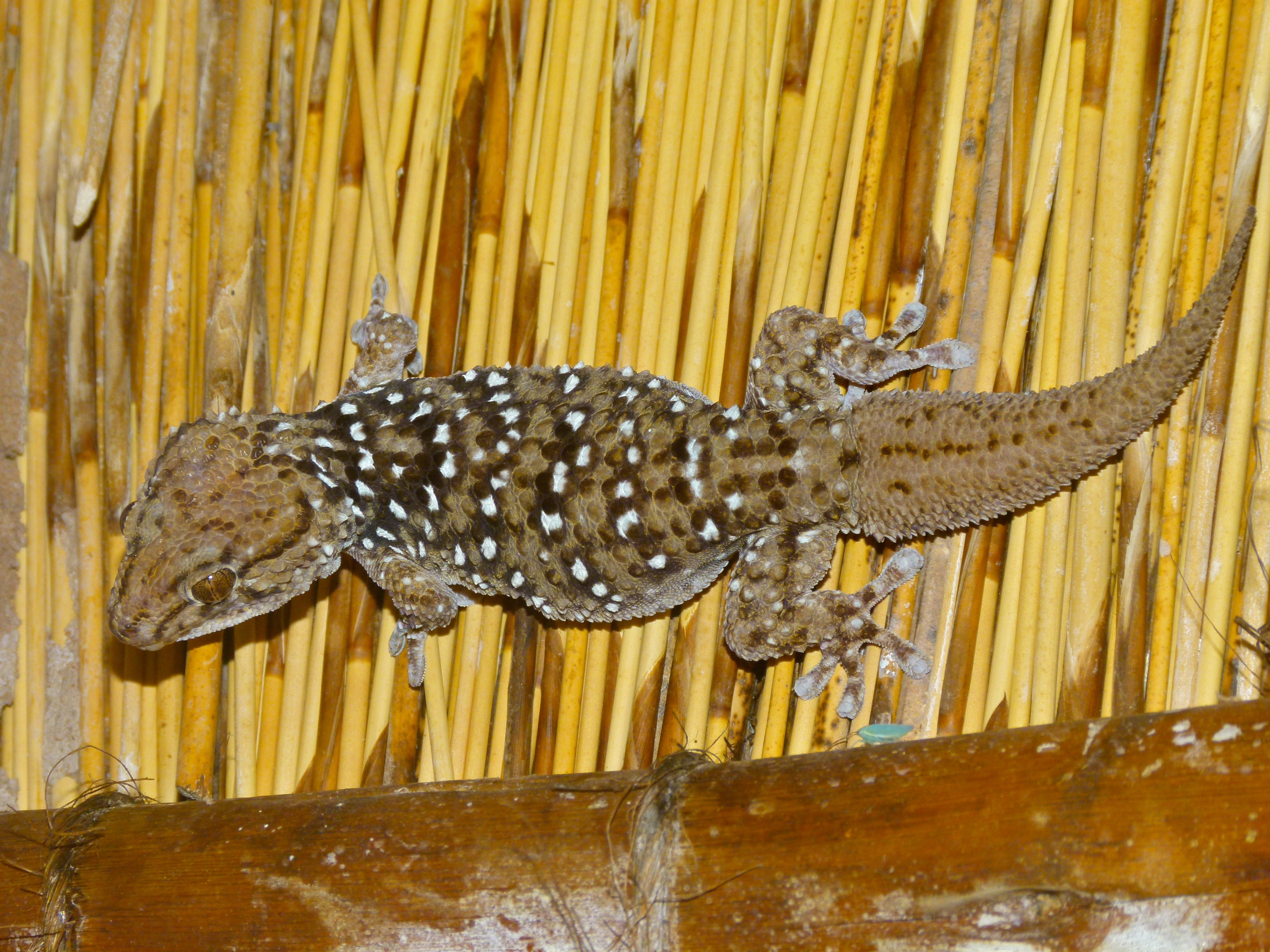

Scientific classification
- Kingdom: Animalia
- Phylum: Chordata
- Class: Reptilia
- Order: Squamata
- Suborder: Gekkota
- Family: Gekkonidae
- Genus: Chondrodactylus
- Species: C. turneri

Binomial name
- Chondrodactylus turneri (Gray, 1864)

Synonyms
- Homodactylus turneri Gray, 1864; Pachydactylus bibroni turneri — Parker, 1936; Pachydactylus turneri — Bates & Heideman, 1997; Chondrodactylus turneri — Bauer & Lamb, 2005

= Turner's thick-toed gecko =

Species of lizard

Turner's thick-toed gecko (Chondrodactylus turneri) is a species of lizard in the family Gekkonidae. The species is endemic to southern Africa.

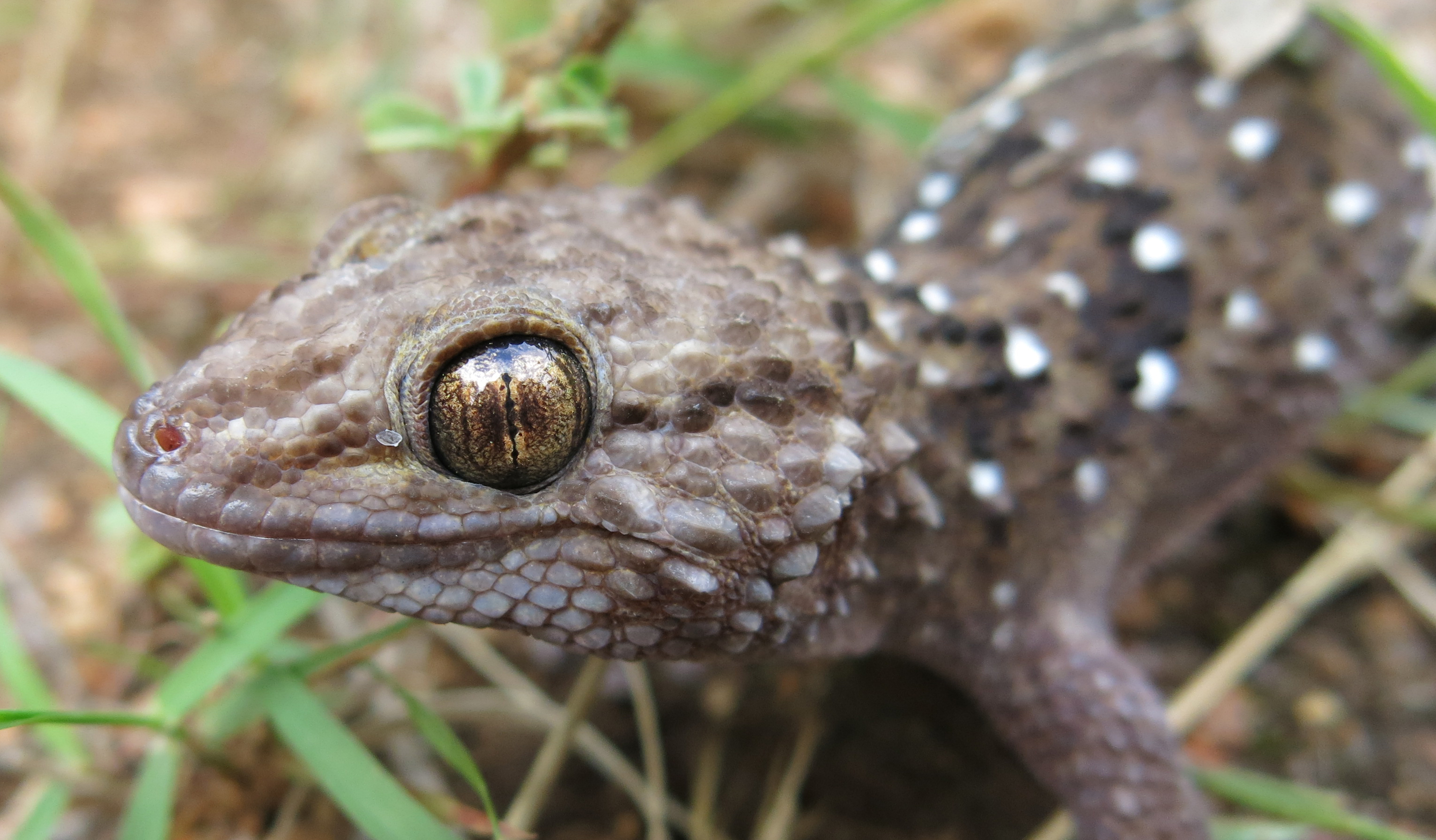
C. turneri at Selati, Limpopo

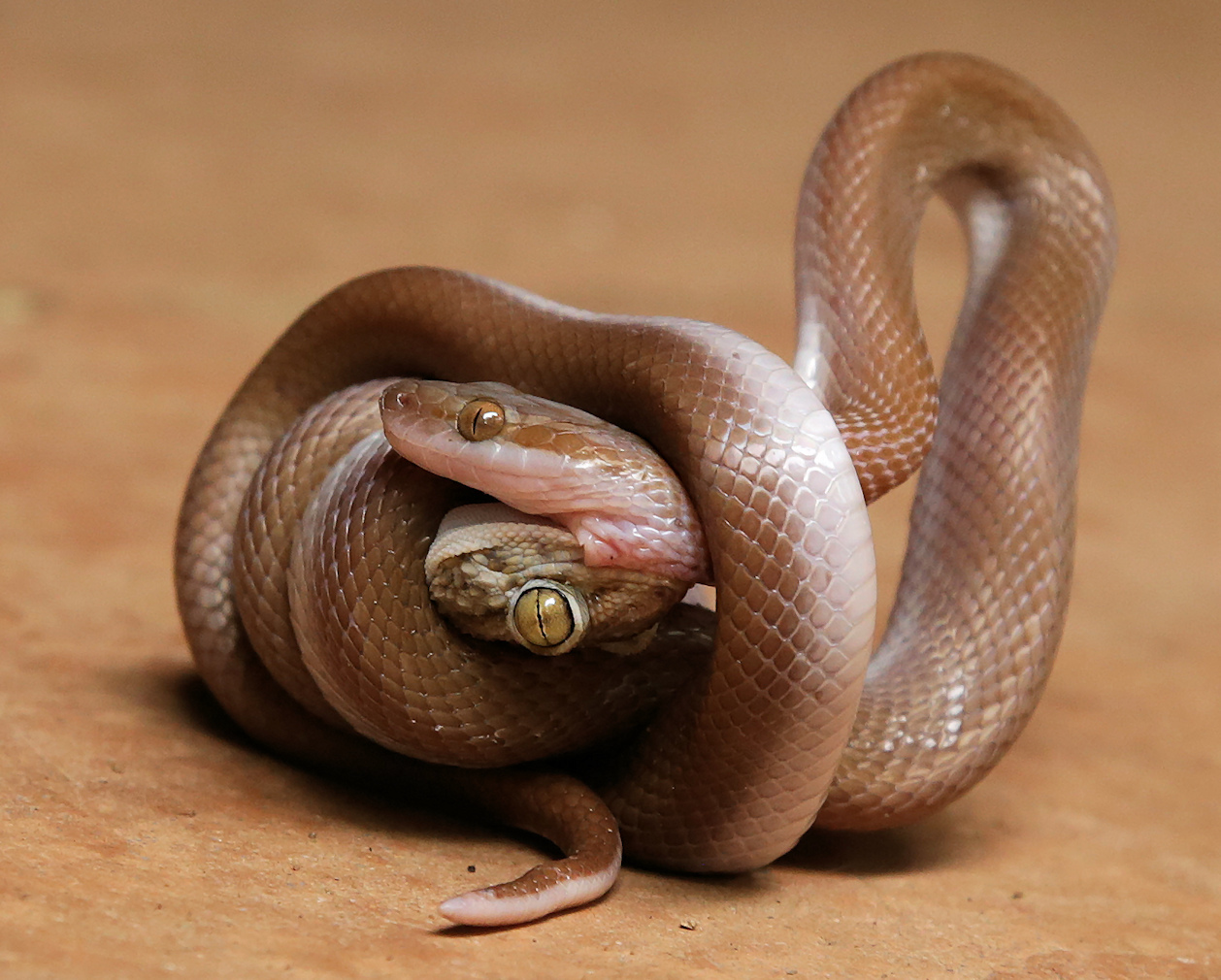
With a Cape house snake.

== Description ==
C. turneri is large and robust, with a snout-vent length (SVL) of 10 cm (3.9 in).

== Etymology ==
The specific name, turneri, is in honor of British entomologist James Aspinall Turner.

== Geographic range ==
C. turneri is found in Angola, Botswana, Eswatini, Kenya, Malawi, Mozambique, Namibia, Rwanda, South Africa, Tanzania, Zambia, and Zimbabwe.

== Behaviour ==
Turner's thick-toed gecko is nocturnal and lives on rocks and buildings.

== Diet ==
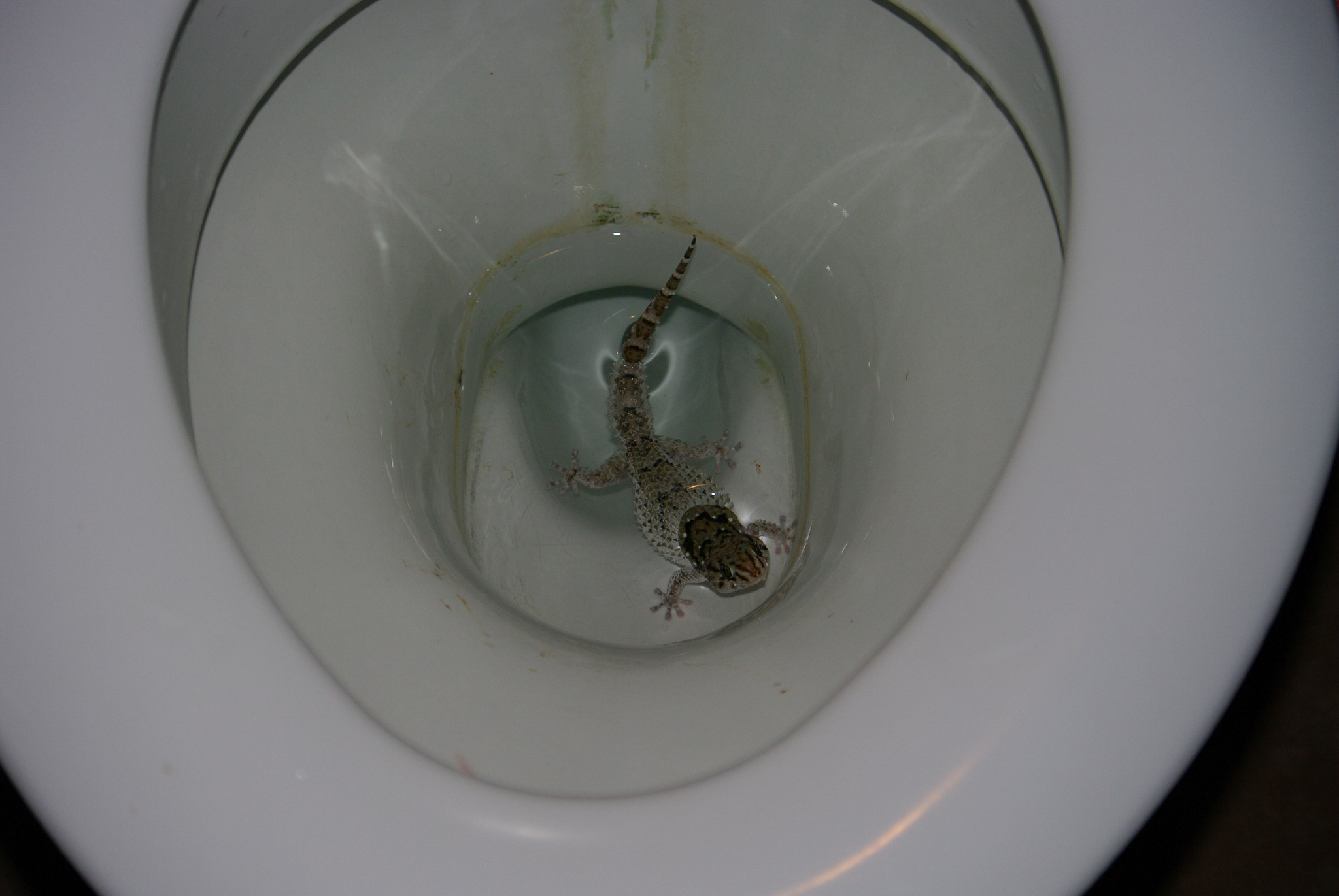
In a toilet in South Africa.

C. turneri is an ambush predator and feeds on invertebrates and whatever else it can catch and overpower.

== Reproduction ==
C. turneri is oviparous.
