= Mark Philips (politician) =

British politician

Mark Philips (4 November 1800 – 23 December 1873) was an English Liberal Party politician. He was one of the first pair of Members of Parliament for Manchester after the Great Reform Act.

== Early life and family ==
Mark Philips was born at Philips Park, Whitefield, Lancashire, the son of Robert Philips, a prosperous merchant and Anne Needham. He was educated at the Manchester Academy while it was in York and then at the University of Glasgow. His younger brother, Robert Needham Philips, was MP for Bury and other members of his extended family were also elected to the House of Commons; all of them, as with Mark, supported the ideals of Manchesterism.

He has been described as a "radical entrepreneur" and campaigned in favour of causes promoting non-sectarianism before entering the House of Commons.

== Member of Parliament ==
The town of Manchester was deprived of its parliamentary representation in 1660 in reprisal for its support of the Parliamentarian faction during the English Civil War. Representation was only restored following the Reform Act 1832.

Philips and Charles Poulett Thomson were the first pair of MPs, elected in that year. He represented the city in Parliament until 1847. He was an active member of the Anti-Corn Law League and a champion of universal education. In 1837 he chaired a meeting that led to the creation of the Lancashire Public Schools' Association which was instrumental in establishing a system of publicly funded schooling in the UK.

== Other works ==
Philips also played an important role in establishing England's first free public library in 1852 and he was President of his old school, Manchester Academy, from 1842 to 1846 and from 1871 until his death. He was High Sheriff of Warwickshire for 1851.

Philips donated money to many causes including £1,000 towards the fund for the provision of open spaces and parks for the City of Manchester. This resulted in many estates being purchased by the city, including Lark Hill in Salford, which became Peel Park, and the Bradford Estate which became Philips Park in east Manchester.

He died, aged 73, at Welcombe House, Snitterfield, near Stratford-upon-Avon.

== Honours ==
- Philips Park in the Bradford area of east Manchester is named after him.
- There is a statue in Manchester Town Hall.
- An obelisk erected in memory of Philips in 1876 stands on the family's former estate outside Stratford-upon-Avon.
- His portrait hangs in the Mayor's Chambers at Manchester Town Hall.

== See also ==
- George Philips senior, MP
- George Philips junior, MP
- J. & N. Philips

Parliament of the United Kingdom
| New constituency | Member of Parliament for Manchester; 1832–1847; With: Charles Poulett Thomson 1832–1839; Robert Hyde Greg 1839–1841; Thomas Milner Gibson 1841–1847 | Succeeded by Thomas Milner Gibson; John Bright |
Honorary titles
| Preceded by Darwin Galton | High Sheriff of Warwickshire; 1851 | Succeeded by Sir John Newdigate-Ludford-Chetwode |
