= Richard Radcliffe =

English politician

Richard Radcliffe (died 9 October 1660) was an English politician who sat in the House of Commons in 1656.

Radcliffe was the son of Richard Radcliffe of Manchester who died in 1645 and was probably descended from the Radcliffes of Ordsall. He was of the Lodge, Pool Field, Manchester.

In 1656, Radcliffe was elected Member of Parliament for Manchester in the Second Protectorate Parliament. The Manchester constituency had been created in 1654 for the First Protectorate Parliament and was disenfranchised again for the Third Protectorate Parliament.

Parliament of England
Preceded by Charles Worsley	Member of Parliament for Manchester; 1656	Succeeded by Constituency disenfranchised
