= Thomas Bazley =

British industrialist and politician (1797–1885)

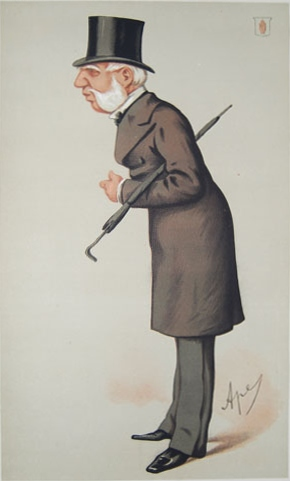
"Manchester" Bazley as caricatured by Ape (Carlo Pellegrini) in Vanity Fair, August 1875

Sir Thomas Bazley, 1st Baronet DL (27 May 1797 – 18 March 1885) was a British industrialist and Liberal politician.

== Life ==
He was born at Gilnow, near Bolton, Lancashire. His father, also Thomas, was a cotton manufacturer, mathematician and journalist. Following education at Bolton Grammar School, Bazley was apprenticed to the cotton-spinning business of Messrs Ainsworth and Company. He subsequently went into business on his own account as a yarn merchant in Bolton. In 1826 he went into partnership with Robert Gardner, and they took over mills in Manchester and Halliwell. At Halliwell they established Barrow Bridge as a model non-sectarian industrial community. Bazley became the sole owner of Barrow Bridge in 1847, and the company became the world's largest manufacturer of fine cotton and lace thread. He was a major employer who also built schools and reading rooms for his employees.

In 1828 he married Mary Maria Sarah Nash, and they had one son, born in 1829.

From the 1830s Bazley was an active member of the Anti Corn Law League, and from 1845 to 1860 was president of the Manchester Chamber of Trade, He was elected to membership of the Manchester Literary and Philosophical Society on 26 January 1847 and was appointed as Deputy Lieutenant of the County Palatine of Lancaster.

His expertise on the cotton industry led to his appointment as one of the commissioners of the Great Exhibition of 1851 and of the Paris International Exhibition of 1855. From 1853 to 1855 he was a member of the Royal Commission on assimilating the mercantile laws of the United Kingdom.

In 1858 he was elected unopposed as one of the members of parliament for the Parliamentary Borough of Manchester in the Liberal interest. He held the seat at subsequent elections until 1880. Due to the pressure of parliamentary work, he retired from business, selling his concern to William Romaine Callender in 1861. Callender was later to become one of Bazley's colleagues as MP for Manchester.

In the 1860s he acquired estates in Gloucestershire, Hertfordshire and Oxfordshire. In 1870 he moved permanently to his Gloucestershire estates near Fairford.

In 1867 he was admitted to the French Légion d'honneur. In 1869 he was created a baronet "of Hatherop in the County of Gloucester" for his services to public life and the cotton industry on the advice of the Prime Minister, William Ewart Gladstone.

Sir Thomas Bazley died suddenly at his summer residence "Riversleigh", Lytham, Lancashire in March 1885 aged 88. He was buried next to his father at St John's Church, Deansgate, Manchester.

== Family ==
He married, on 2 June 1828, Mary Maria Sarah, daughter of Sebastian Nash of Clayton, near Manchester; she died 22 August 1897, and left an only child, Sir Thomas Sebastian Bazley.

Parliament of the United Kingdom
Preceded by John Potter; James Aspinall Turner	Member of Parliament for Manchester; 1858–1880; With: James Aspinall Turner 1858–1865; Edward James 1865–1867; Jacob Bright 1867–1874, 1876–1880; William Romaine Callender 1874–1876; Hugh Birley 1868–1880	Succeeded by Hugh Birley; Jacob Bright; John Slagg
Preceded by Joseph Warner Henley	Oldest Member of Parliament? (not Father of the House); 1878–1880	Succeeded by William Bulkeley Hughes
Baronetage of the United Kingdom
New creation	Baronet (of Hatherop); 1869–1883	Succeeded by Thomas Bazley
