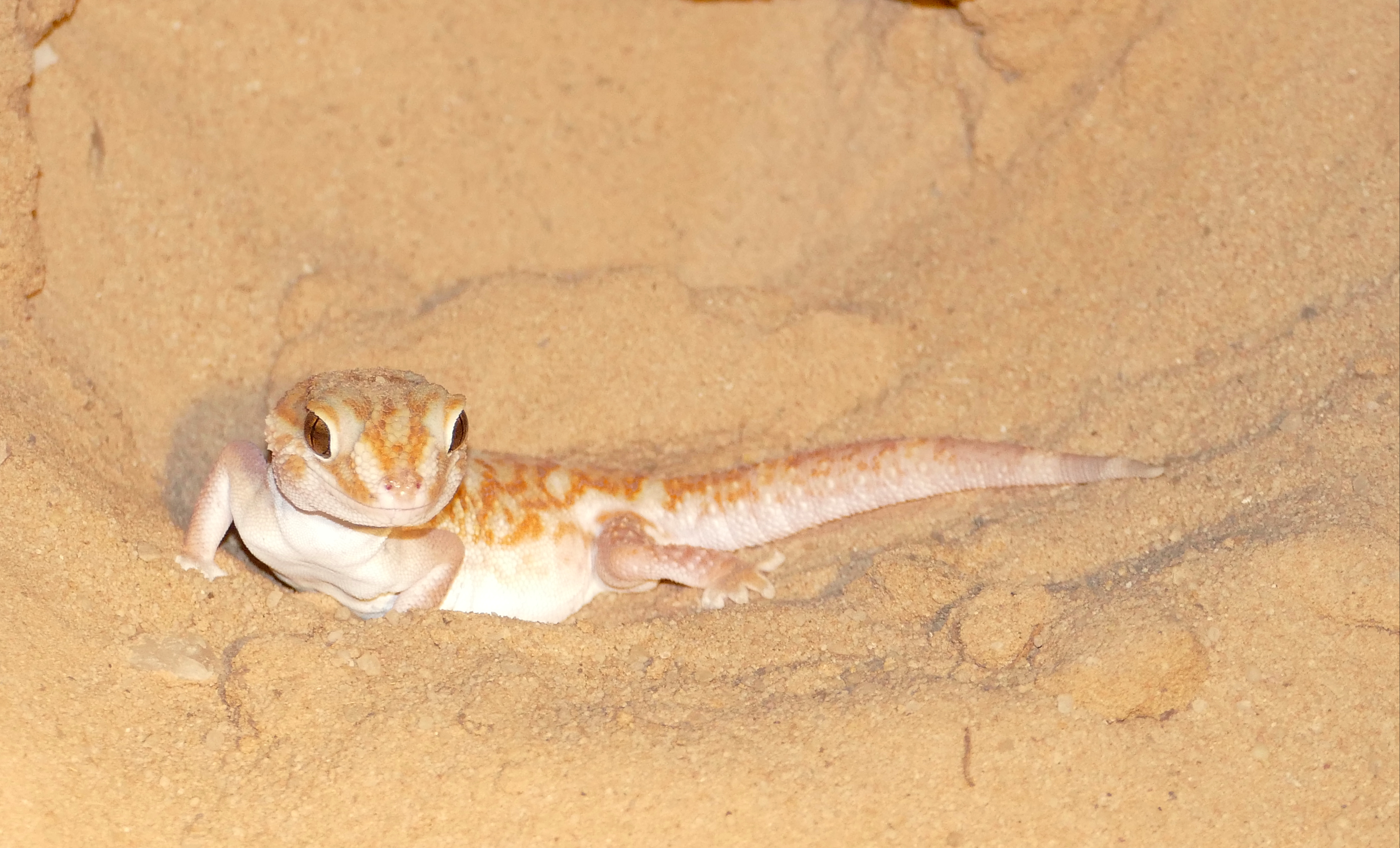

Conservation status
- Least Concern (IUCN 3.1)

Scientific classification
- Kingdom: Animalia
- Phylum: Chordata
- Class: Reptilia
- Order: Squamata
- Suborder: Gekkota
- Family: Gekkonidae
- Genus: Chondrodactylus
- Species: C. angulifer

Binomial name
- Chondrodactylus angulifer W. Peters, 1870
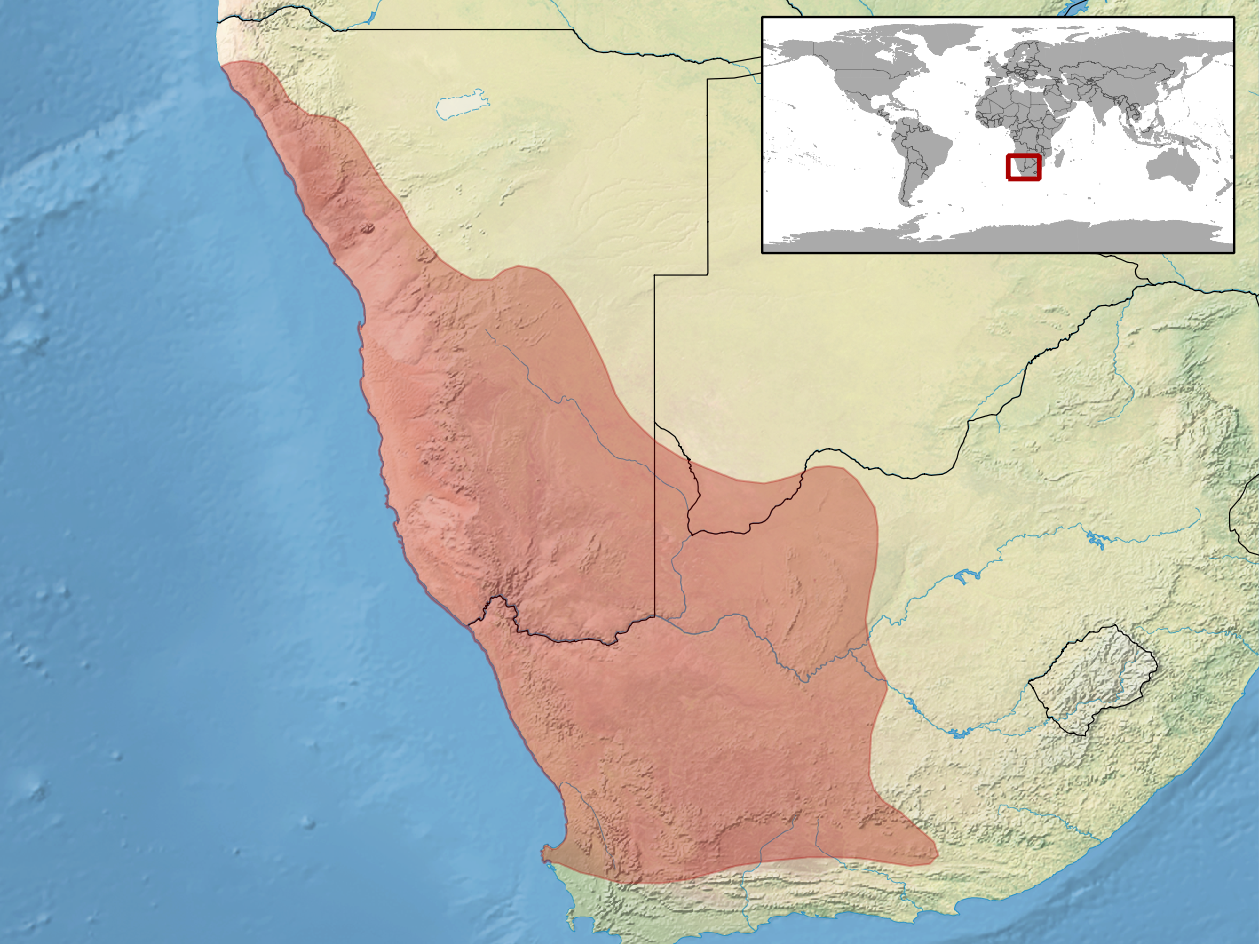
- range

= Chondrodactylus angulifer =

Species of lizard

Chondrodactylus angulifer, also known as the common giant ground gecko, the South African ground gecko, or the Namib sand gecko, is a species of gecko, a lizard in the family Gekkonidae. The species is endemic to southern Africa.

== Geographic range ==
Chondrodactylus angulifer is found in Namibia, southernmost Botswana, and western South Africa.

== Description ==
Chondrodactylus angulifer is a medium sized gecko. Adults average 7 to 9 cm (2.8 to 3.5 in) snout-to-vent length (SVL). The record size is a male 11.3 cm (4.4 in) SVL.

== Reproduction ==
An adult female C. angulifer may lay a clutch of one or two eggs. The eggs are almost spherical, 18 by 16 mm (0.71 by 0.63 in). Each hatchling is approximately 7 cm (2.8 in) total length (including tail).

== Subspecies ==
There are two subspecies which are recognized as being valid, including the nominotypical subspecies.

- Chondrodactylus angulifer subsp. angulifer W. Peters, 1870
- Chondrodactylus angulifer subsp. namibensis Haacke, 1976
