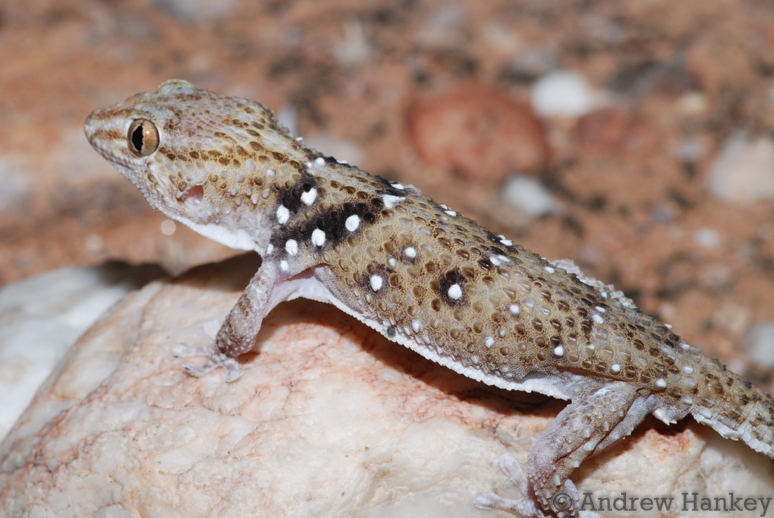

Scientific classification
- Kingdom: Animalia
- Phylum: Chordata
- Class: Reptilia
- Order: Squamata
- Suborder: Gekkota
- Family: Gekkonidae
- Genus: Chondrodactylus
- Species: C. pulitzerae

Binomial name
- Chondrodactylus pulitzerae (Schmidt, 1933)

Synonyms
- Pachydactylus bibronii pulitzerae Schmidt, 1933; Pachydactylus laevigatus pulitzerae — Benyr, 1995; Pachydactylus turneri pulitzerae — Branch, 1998; Chondrodactylus pulitzerae — Ceríaco et al., 2014

= Pulitzer's thick-toed gecko =

Species of lizard

Pulitzer's thick-toed gecko (Chondrodactylus pulitzerae) is a species of gecko, a lizard in the family Gekkonidae. The species is endemic to southern Africa.

== Etymology ==
The specific name, pulitzerae, is feminine, genitive, singular. Schmidt did not specify whom he meant to honor. It may commemorate Margaret Pulitzer, second wife of Ralph Pulitzer, both of whom were members of the Pulitzer Angola Expedition, or it may commemorate their infant daughter who had died of polio.

== Geographic range ==
C. pulitzerae is found from northern Namibia through southern Angola.
