= John Bright =

British Radical and Liberal statesman (1811–1889)

The Right Honourable John Bright
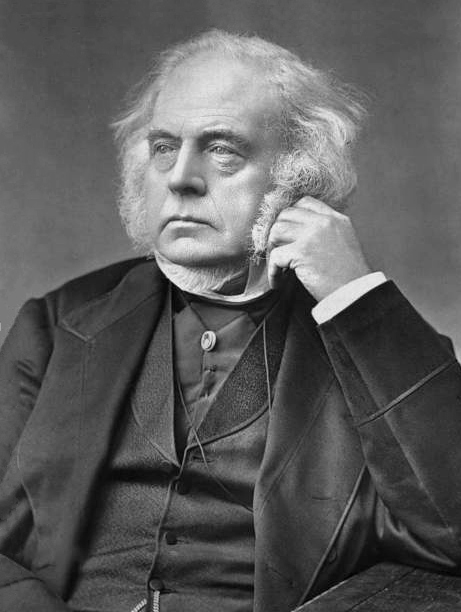
- John Bright in the 1870s

President of the Board of Trade
- In office 9 December 1868 – 14 January 1871
- Monarch: Victoria
- Prime Minister: William Ewart Gladstone
- Preceded by: The Duke of Richmond
- Succeeded by: Chichester Parkinson-Fortescue

Chancellor of the Duchy of Lancaster
- In office 30 September 1873 – 17 February 1874
- Monarch: Victoria
- Prime Minister: William Ewart Gladstone
- Preceded by: Hugh Childers
- Succeeded by: Thomas Edward Taylor
- In office 28 April 1880 – 25 July 1882
- Monarch: Victoria
- Prime Minister: William Ewart Gladstone
- Preceded by: Thomas Edward Taylor
- Succeeded by: The Earl of Kimberley

Parliamentary offices
- 1843–1847: Member of Parliament for City of Durham
- 1847–1857: Member of Parliament for Manchester
- 1857–1885: Member of Parliament for Birmingham
- 1869–1870: Member of the Legislative Assembly of Queensland for Kennedy
- 1885–1889: Member of Parliament for Birmingham Central

Personal details
- Born: 16 November 1811 Rochdale, Lancashire, England
- Died: 27 March 1889 (aged 77) Rochdale, Lancashire, England
- Party: Liberal Unionist (1886–89); Liberal (1859–86); Radical (until 1859)
- Spouses: Elizabeth Priestman (m. 1839; died 1841); Margaret Leatham (m. 1847)

John Bright (16 November 1811 – 27 March 1889) was a British Radical and Liberal statesman, one of the greatest orators of his generation and a promoter of free trade policies.

A Quaker, Bright is most famous for battling the Corn Laws. In partnership with Richard Cobden, he founded the Anti–Corn Law League, aimed at abolishing the Corn Laws, which raised food prices and protected landowners' interests by levying taxes on imported wheat. The Corn Laws were repealed in 1846. Bright also worked with Cobden in another free trade initiative, the Cobden–Chevalier Treaty of 1860, promoting closer interdependence between Great Britain and the Second French Empire. This campaign was conducted in collaboration with French economist Michel Chevalier, and succeeded despite Parliament's endemic mistrust of the French.

Bright sat in the House of Commons from 1843 to 1889, promoting free trade, electoral reform and religious freedom. He was almost a lone voice in opposing the Crimean War; he also opposed William Ewart Gladstone's proposed Home Rule for Ireland. He saw himself as a spokesman for the middle class and strongly opposed the privileges of the landed aristocracy. In terms of Ireland, he sought to end the political privileges of Anglicans, disestablished the Church of Ireland, and began land reform that would turn land over to the Catholic peasants. He coined the phrase "mother of parliaments."

== Early life ==
Bright was born at Greenbank, Rochdale, in Lancashire, England—one of the early centres of the Industrial Revolution. His father, Jacob Bright, was a much respected Quaker, who had started a cotton mill at Rochdale in 1809. Jacob's father, Abraham, was a Wiltshire yeoman, who, early in the 18th century, moved to Coventry, where his descendants remained. Jacob Bright was educated at the Ackworth School of the Society of Friends, and apprenticed to a fustian manufacturer at New Mills, Derbyshire. John Bright was his son by his second wife, Martha Wood, daughter of a Quaker shopkeeper of Bolton-le-Moors. Educated at Ackworth School, she was a woman of great strength of character and refined taste. There were eleven children of this marriage, of whom John was the eldest surviving son. His younger brother was Jacob Bright, an MP and mayor. His sisters included Priscilla Bright McLaren (whose husband was Duncan McLaren MP) and Margaret Bright Lucas. John was a delicate child and was sent as a day pupil to a boarding school near his home, kept by William Littlewood. A year at the Ackworth School, two years at Bootham School, York, and a year and a half at Newton, near Clitheroe, completed his education. He later claimed to have learned little Latin and Greek at school, but instead acquired a love of English literature, which his mother fostered, and a love of outdoor pursuits. In his sixteenth year, he entered his father's mill, and in due time became a partner in the business.

In Rochdale, Jacob Bright was a leader of the opposition to a local church-rate. Rochdale was also prominent in the movement for parliamentary reform, by which the town successfully claimed to have a member allotted to it under the Reform Bill. John Bright took part in both campaigns. He was an ardent Nonconformist, proud to number among his ancestors John Gratton, a friend of George Fox and one of the persecuted and imprisoned preachers of the Religious Society of Friends. His political interest was probably first kindled by the Preston election in 1830, in which Edward Stanley, after a long struggle, was defeated by Henry "Orator" Hunt.

But it was as a member of the Rochdale Juvenile Temperance Band that Bright first learned public speaking. These young men went out into the villages, borrowed a chair of a cottager, and spoke from it at open-air meetings. John Bright's first extempore speech was at a temperance meeting. Bright got his notes muddled and broke down. The chairman gave out a temperance song, and during the singing told Bright to put his notes aside and say what came into his mind. Bright obeyed, began with much hesitancy, but found his tongue and made an excellent address, although sometimes he spoke with a confused syntax. Tales of these early years circulated through Britain and the United States late into his career, to the extent that students at institutions such as the young Cornell University regarded him as an exemplar for activities such as the Irving Literary Society.

On some early occasions, however, he committed his speech to memory. In 1832 he called on the Rev. John Aldis, an eminent Baptist minister, to accompany him to a local Bible meeting. Mr Aldis described him as a slender, modest young gentleman, who surprised him by his intelligence and thoughtfulness, but who seemed nervous as they walked to the meeting together. At the meeting he made a stimulating speech, and on the way home asked for advice. Mr Aldis counselled him not to learn his speeches, but to write out and commit to memory certain passages and the peroration. This "first lesson in public speaking", as Bright called it, was given in his twenty-first year, but he had not then contemplated a public career. He was a fairly prosperous man of business, very happy in his home, always ready to take part in the social, educational and political life of his native town. A founder of the Rochdale Literary and Philosophical Society, he took a leading part in its debates, and on returning from a holiday journey in the east, gave the society a lecture on his travels.

== Cobden and the Corn Laws ==
He first met Richard Cobden in 1836 or 1837. Cobden was an alderman of the newly formed Manchester Corporation, and Bright went to ask him to speak at an education meeting in Rochdale. Cobden consented, and at the meeting was much struck by Bright's short speech and urged him to speak against the Corn Laws. His first speech on the Corn Laws was made at Rochdale in 1838, and in the same year he joined the Manchester provisional committee which in 1839 founded the Anti–Corn Law League. He was still only the local public man, taking part in all public movements, especially in opposition to John Fielden's proposed factory legislation, and to the Rochdale church-rate. In 1839 he built the house which he called "One Ash", and he married Elizabeth, daughter of the Quaker minister Rachel (born Bragg) and the tanner Jonathan Priestman of Newcastle upon Tyne.

In November of the same year there was a dinner in Bolton in honour of Abraham Paulton, who had just returned from an Anti–Corn Law tour in Scotland. Among the speakers were Cobden and Bright, and the dinner is memorable as the first occasion on which the two future leaders appeared together on a Free Trade platform. Bright is described by the historian of the League as "a young man then appearing for the first time in any meeting out of his own town, and giving evidence, by his energy and by his grasp of the subject, of his capacity soon to take a leading part in the great agitation."

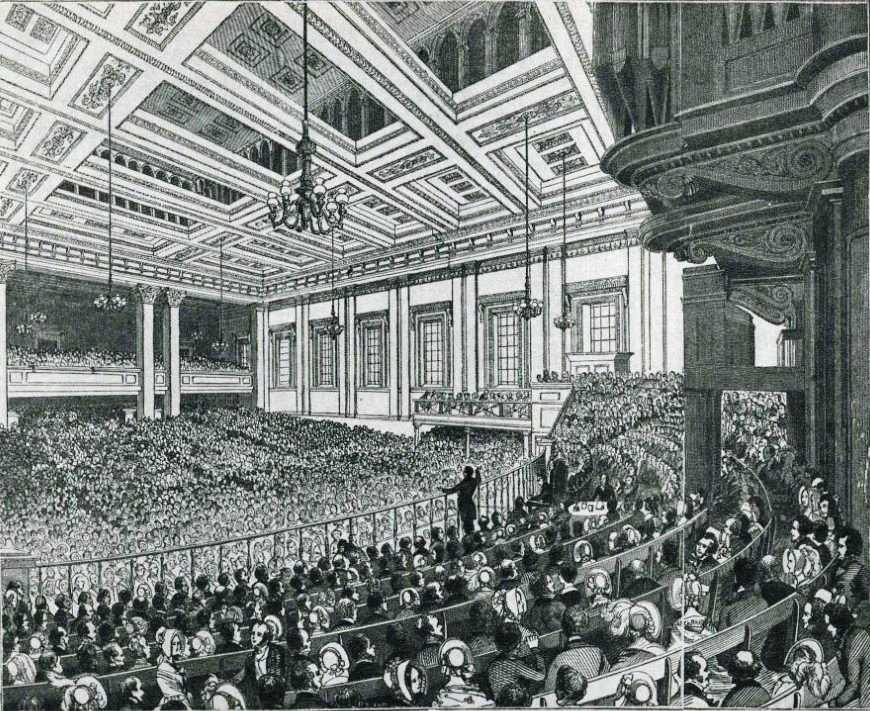
Meeting of the Anti–Corn Law League in Exeter Hall, London, in 1846

In 1840 he led a movement against the Rochdale church-rate, speaking from a tombstone in the churchyard, where it looks down on the town in the valley below. A daughter, Helen, was born to him; but his young wife, after a long illness, died of tuberculosis in September 1841. Three days after her death at Leamington, Cobden called to see him. "I was in the depths of grief", said Bright, when unveiling the statue of his friend at Bradford in 1877, "I might almost say of despair, for the life and sunshine of my house had been extinguished." Cobden spoke some words of condolence, but "after a time he looked up and said, 'There are thousands of homes in England at this moment where wives, mothers and children are dying of hunger. Now, when the first paroxysm of your grief is past, I would advise you to come with me, and we will never rest till the Corn Laws are repealed.' I accepted his invitation", added Bright, "and from that time we never ceased to labour hard on behalf of the resolution which we had made."

== Into Parliament: the Member for Durham ==
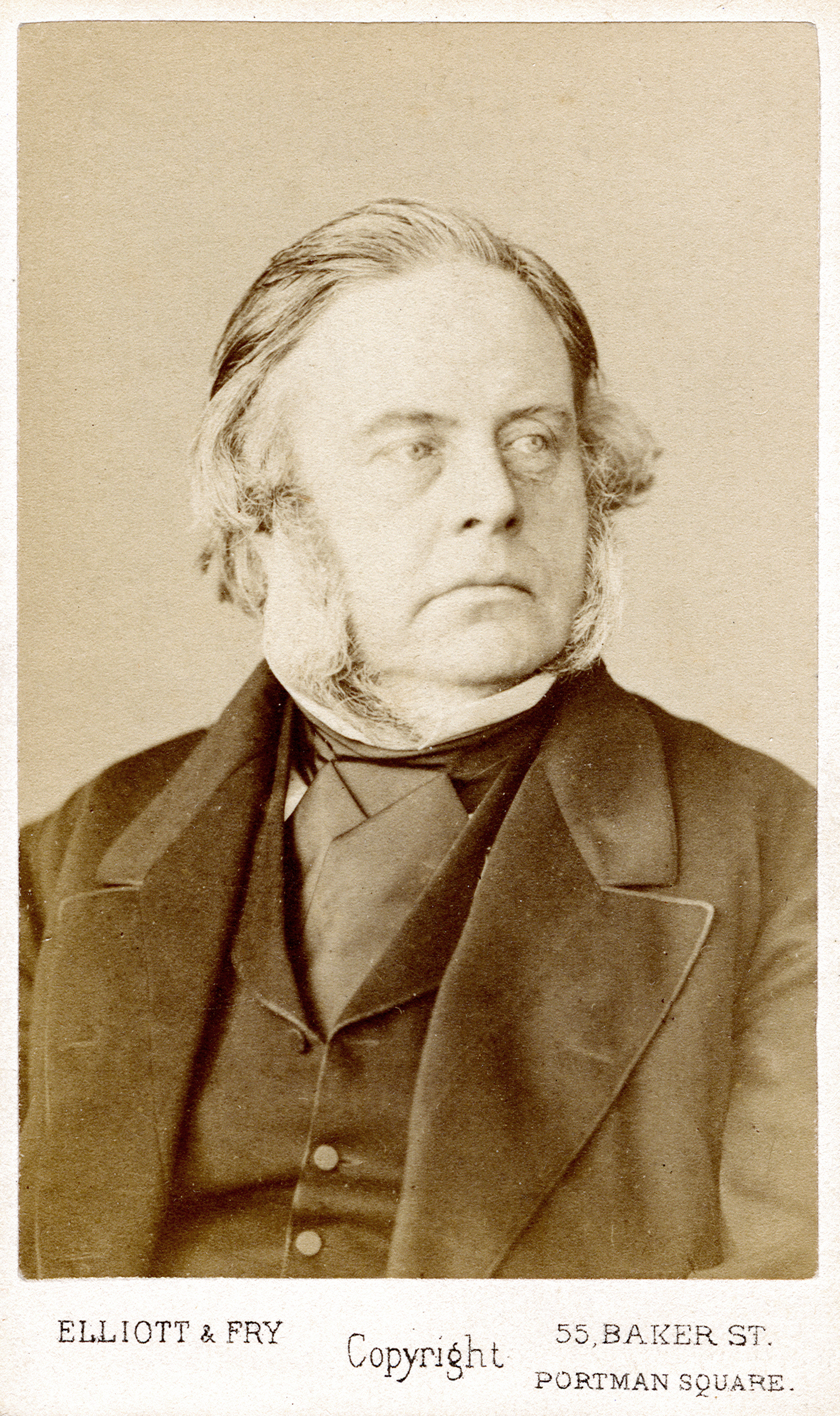
Carte de visite of John Bright by Elliott & Fry

At the general election in 1841 Cobden was returned for Stockport, Cheshire, and in 1843 Bright was the Free Trade candidate at a by-election at Durham. He was defeated, but his successful competitor was unseated on petition, and at the second contest Bright was returned. He was already known as Cobden's chief ally and was received in the House of Commons with suspicion and hostility. In the Anti–Corn Law movement, the two speakers complemented each other. Cobden had the calmness and confidence of the political philosopher; Bright had the passion and the fervour of the popular orator. Cobden did the reasoning, Bright supplied the declamation, but mingled argument with appeal. No orator of modern times rose more rapidly. He was not known beyond his own borough when Cobden called him to his side in 1841, and he entered parliament towards the end of the session of 1843 with a formidable reputation. He had been all over England and Scotland addressing vast meetings and, as a rule, carrying them with him; he had taken a leading part in a conference held by the Anti–Corn Law League in London had led deputations to the Duke of Sussex, to Sir James Graham, then home secretary, and to Lord Ripon and Gladstone, the secretary and undersecretary of the Board of Trade; and he was universally recognised as the chief orator of the Free Trade movement. Wherever "John Bright of Rochdale" was announced to speak, vast crowds assembled. He had been so announced, for the last time, at the first great meeting in Drury Lane Theatre on 15 March 1843; henceforth his name was enough. He took his seat in the House of Commons as one of the members for Durham on 28 July 1843, and on 7 August delivered his maiden speech in support of a motion by Mr Ewart for reduction of import duties. He was there, he said, "not only as one of the representatives of the city of Durham, but also as one of the representatives of that benevolent organisation, the Anti–Corn Law League." A member who heard the speech described Bright as "about the middle size, rather firmly and squarely built, with a fair, clear complexion and an intelligent and pleasing expression of countenance. His voice is good, his enunciation distinct, and his delivery free from any unpleasant peculiarity or mannerism." He wore the usual Friend's coat and was regarded with much interest and hostile curiosity on both sides of the House.

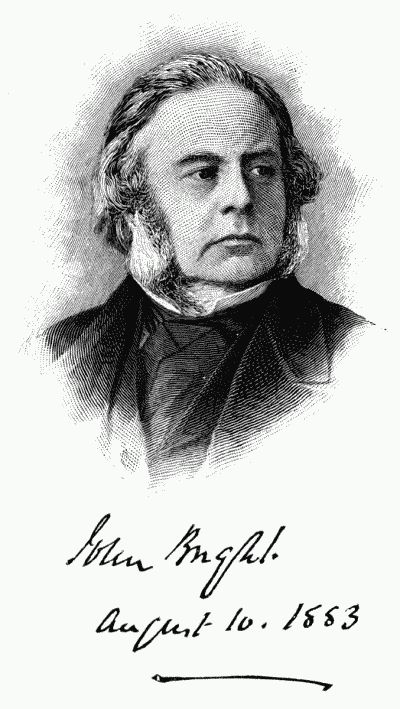
Engraving for reproductions

Mr Ewart's motion was defeated, but the movement of which Cobden and Bright were the leaders continued to spread. In the autumn the League resolved to raise £100,000; an appeal was made to the agricultural interest by great meetings in the farming counties, and in November The Times startled the country by declaring, in a leading article, "The League is a great fact. It would be foolish, nay, rash, to deny its importance." In London great meetings were held in Covent Garden Theatre, at which William Johnson Fox was the chief orator, but Bright and Cobden were the leaders of the movement. Bright publicly deprecated the popular tendency to regard Cobden and himself as the chief movers in the agitation, and Cobden told a Rochdale audience that he always stipulated that he should speak first, and Bright should follow. His "more stately genius", as John Morley calls it, was already making him the undisputed master of the feelings of his audiences. In the House of Commons his progress was slower. Cobden's argumentative speeches were regarded more sympathetically than Bright's more rhetorical appeals, and in a debate on George Villiers's annual motion against the Corn Laws, Bright was heard with so much impatience that he was obliged to sit down.

In the next session (1845) he moved for an inquiry into the operation of the Game Laws. At a meeting of county members earlier in the day Robert Peel, then Prime Minister, had advised them not to be led into discussion by a violent speech from the member for Durham, but to let the committee be granted without debate. Bright was not violent, and Cobden said that he did his work admirably, and won golden opinions from all men. The speech established his position in the House of Commons. In this session Bright and Cobden came into opposition, Cobden voting for the Maynooth Grant and Bright against it. On only one other occasion—a vote for South Kensington—did they go into opposite lobbies, during twenty-five years of parliamentary life.

In the autumn of 1845 Bright retained Cobden in the public career to which Cobden had invited him four years before; Bright was in Scotland when a letter came from Cobden announcing his determination, forced on him by business difficulties, to retire from public work. Bright replied that if Cobden retired the mainspring of the League was gone. "I can in no degree take your place", he wrote. "As a second I can fight, but there are incapacities about me, of which I am fully conscious, which prevent my being more than second in such a work as we have laboured in." A few days later he set off for Manchester, posting in that wettest of autumns through "the rain that rained away the Corn Laws", and on his arrival got his friends together, and raised the money which tided Cobden over the emergency. The crisis of the struggle had come. Peel's budget in 1845 was a first step towards Free Trade. The bad harvest and the potato blight drove him to the repeal of the Corn Laws, and at a meeting in Manchester on 2 July 1846 Cobden moved and Bright seconded a motion dissolving the league. A library of twelve hundred volumes was presented to Bright as a memorial of the struggle.

== "Flog a dead horse" ==
According to the Oxford English Dictionary, the first recorded use of the expression in its modern sense was by Bright in reference to the Reform Act 1867, which called for more democratic representation in Parliament. Trying to rouse Parliament from its apathy on the issue, he said in a speech, would be like trying to "flog a dead horse" to make it pull a load.

However, an earlier instance is attributed to Bright some thirteen years previously: speaking in the Commons on 28 March 1859 on a similar issue of parliamentary reform, Lord Elcho remarked that Bright had not been "satisfied with the results of his winter campaign" and that "a saying was attributed to him [Bright] that he [had] found he was 'flogging a dead horse.'"

== "England is the Mother of Parliaments" ==
Bright coined this famous phrase on 18 January 1865 in a speech at Birmingham supporting an expansion of the franchise. It has often been misquoted as a reference to the UK Parliament.

== Marriage and Manchester ==
Bright married firstly, on 27 November 1839, Elizabeth Priestman of Newcastle, daughter of Jonathan Priestman and Rachel Bragg. They had one daughter, Helen Priestman Bright (b. 1840) but Elizabeth eventually died of tuberculosis on 10 September 1841. Bright had visited her often but she had been cared for by her sister Margaret. Elizabeth's requests included that Helen Priestman Bright should be brought up by her larger family. She later married William Stephens Clark (1839–1925) of Street in Somerset. Bright married secondly, in June 1847, Margaret Elizabeth Leatham, sister of Edward Aldam Leatham of Wakefield, by whom he had seven children including John Albert Bright and William Leatham Bright. Bright employed Lydia Rous in 1868 to teach his children. He compared her abilities as second only to the Queen.

In July 1847, Bright was elected uncontested for Manchester, with Milner Gibson. In the new parliament, he opposed legislation restricting the hours of labour, and, as a Nonconformist, spoke against clerical control of national education. In 1848 he voted for Hume's household suffrage motion, and introduced a bill for the repeal of the Game Laws. When Lord John Russell brought forward his Ecclesiastical Titles Bill, Bright opposed it as "a little, paltry, miserable measure", and foretold its failure. In this parliament he spoke much on Irish questions. In a speech in favour of the government bill for a rate in aid (a tax on the prosperous parts of Ireland that would have paid for famine relief in the rest of that island) in 1849, he won loud cheers from both sides, and was complimented by Disraeli for having sustained the reputation of that assembly. From this time forward he had the ear of the House, and took effective part in the debates. He spoke against capital punishment, against church-rates, against flogging in the army, and against the Irish Established Church. He supported Cobden's motion for the reduction of public expenditure, and in and out of parliament pleaded for peace.

In the election of 1852 Bright was again returned for Manchester on the principles of free trade, electoral reform and religious freedom. But war was in the air, and the most impassioned speeches he ever delivered were addressed to this parliament in fruitless opposition to the Crimean War. Neither the House nor the country would listen. "I went to the House on Monday", wrote Macaulay in March 1854, "and heard Bright say everything I thought." His most memorable speech, the greatest he ever made, was delivered on 23 February 1855. "The angel of death has been abroad throughout the land. You may almost hear the beating of his wings", he said, and concluded with an appeal that moved the House as it had never been moved within living memory.

In 1860, Bright won another victory with Cobden in a new Free Trade initiative, the Cobden–Chevalier Treaty, promoting closer interdependence between Britain and France. This campaign was conducted in collaboration with French economist Michel Chevalier, and succeeded despite Parliament's endemic mistrust of the French.

== MP for Birmingham: 1858–89 ==
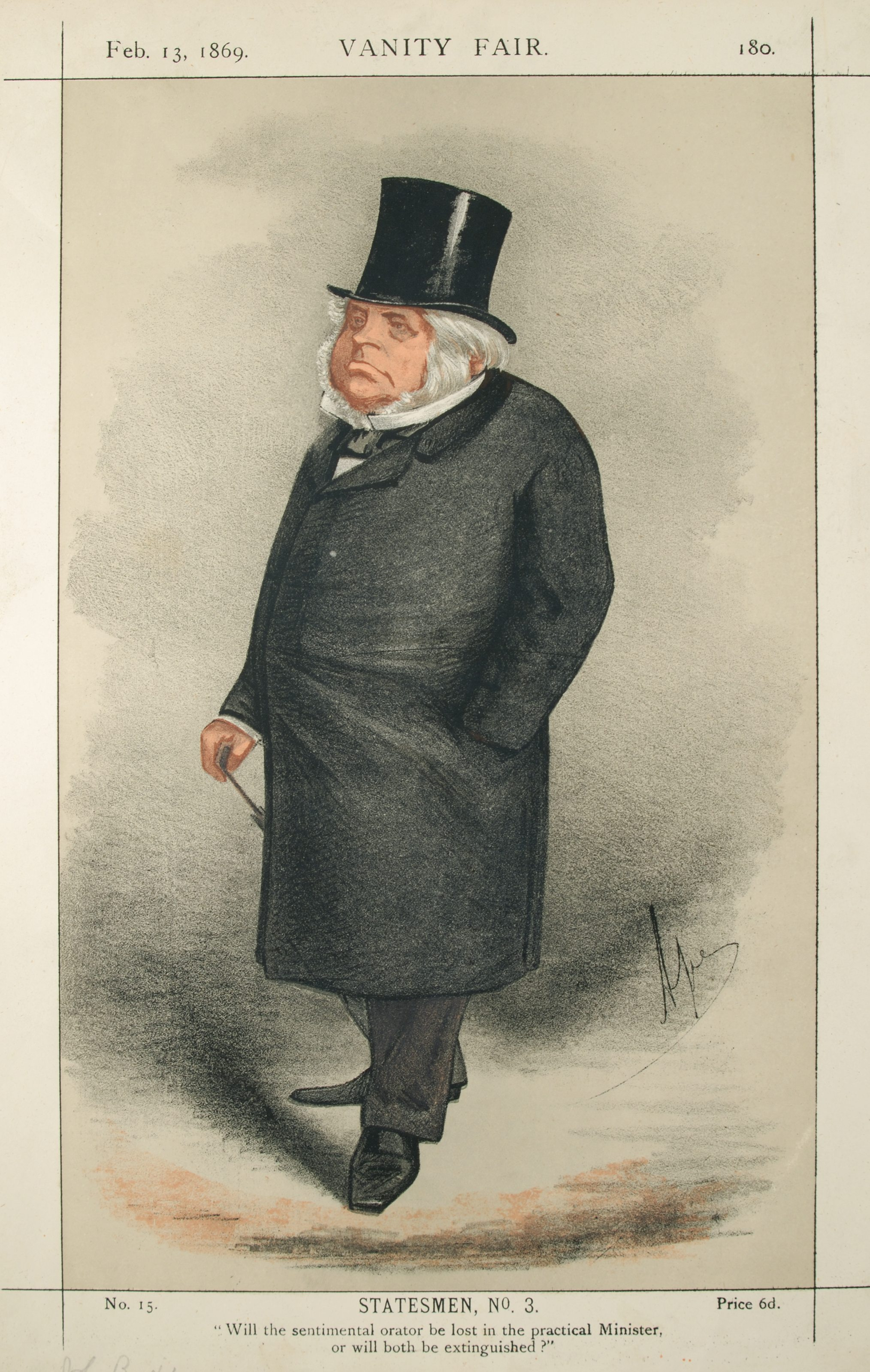
John Bright, Vanity Fair, 1869

In 1857, Bright's unpopular opposition to the Crimean War led to his losing his seat as member for Manchester. Within a few months, he was elected unopposed as one of the two MPs for Birmingham in 1858. He would hold this position for over thirty years though he would later leave the Liberal Party on the issue of Irish Home Rule in 1886.

On 27 October 1858, he launched his campaign for parliamentary reform at Birmingham Town Hall. In 1866 he wrote an essay with the title "Speech on Reform". In this speech he demanded the enfranchisement of the working-class people because of their sheer number, and said that one should rejoice in open demonstrations rather than being confronted with "armed rebellion or secret conspiracy". In 1868, Bright entered the cabinet of Liberal Prime Minister William Gladstone as President of the Board of Trade, but resigned in 1870 due to ill health. He served twice again in Gladstone cabinets as Chancellor of the Duchy of Lancaster (1873–74, 1880–82). In 1882, Gladstone ordered the Royal Navy to bombard Alexandria to recover the debts owed by the Egyptians to British investors. Bright scornfully dismissed it as "a jobbers' war" on behalf of a privileged class of capitalists, and resigned from the Gladstone cabinet."

For deeply personal reasons, Bright was closely associated with the North Wales tourist resort of Llandudno. In 1864, he holidayed there with his wife and five-year-old son. As they passed through the graveyard, the boy said, "Mamma, when I am dead, I want to be buried here." A week later, he had died of scarlet fever, and his wish was granted. Bright returned to Llandudno at least once a year until his own death. He is still commemorated in Llandudno where the principal secondary school was named after him, and a new school, Ysgol John Bright was built in 2004.

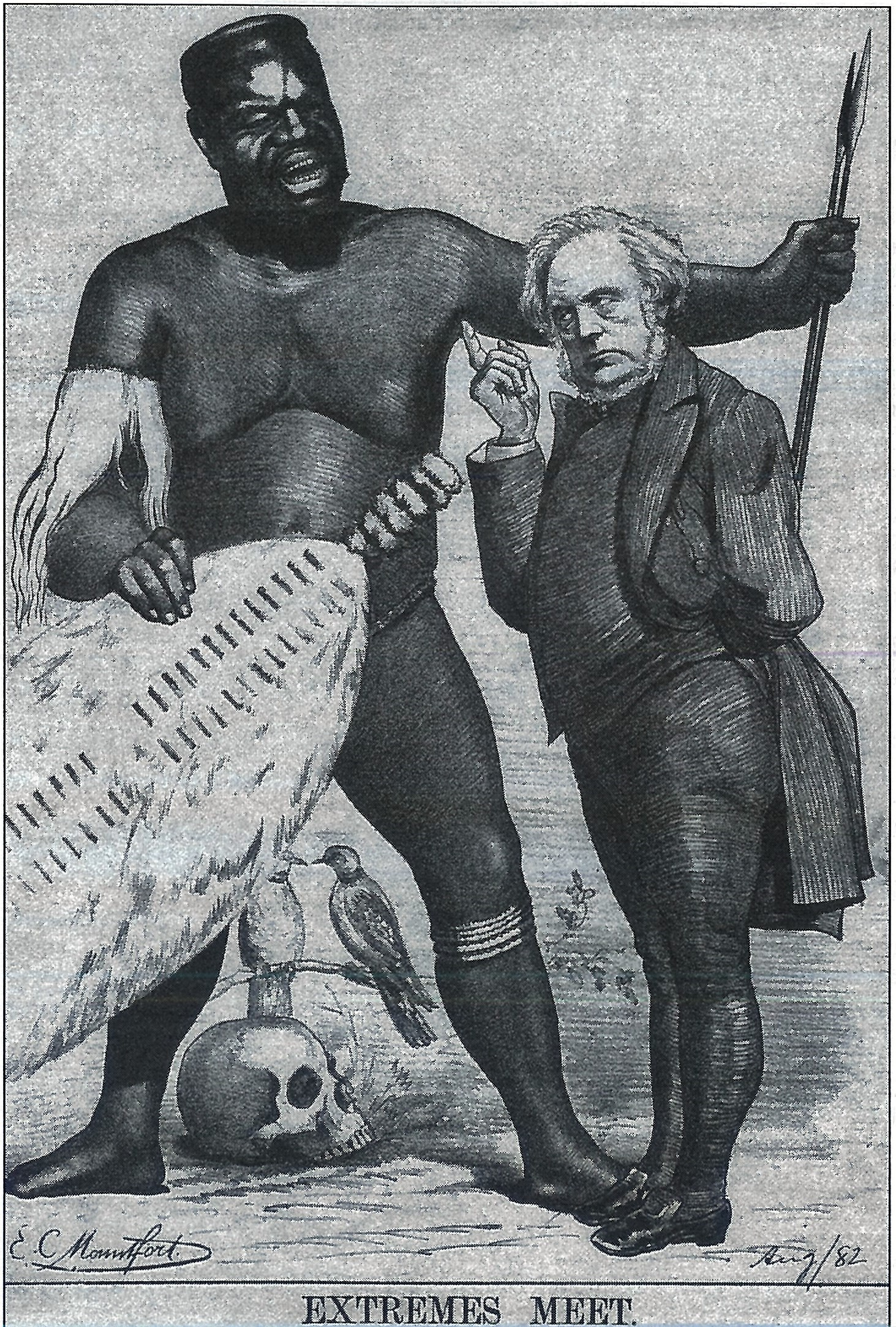
"Extremes meet": cartoon by E. C. Mountfort, depicting Bright wagging his finger at the Zulu king Cetshwayo, who visited England in 1882

Bright had much literary and social recognition in his later years. In 1880 he was elected Lord Rector of the University of Glasgow, although R. W. Dale wrote of his rectorial address: "It was not the old Bright." He was given an honorary degree of the University of Oxford in 1886. He delivered the opening address for the Birmingham Central Library in 1882, and in 1888 the city erected a statue of him. The marble statue, by Albert Joy, was in store until it was restored to a prominent position in the Birmingham Museum and Art Gallery in 2012. Both John Bright Street, close to the Alexandra Theatre in Birmingham, and Morse's Creek in Australia, now known as Bright, Victoria, were renamed in his honour.

=== Opposition to Home Rule ===
When in the wake of the Great Irish Famine, an all-Ireland Tenant Right League was formed, Bright expressed sympathy and support for reform of Irish land tenure. In 1850 he advised the House of Common to "resolutely legislate" on the question. Key for Bright was that "Instead of the [tenant-right] agitation being confined, as heretofore to the Roman Catholics and their clergy, Protestant and Dissenting clergymen seem to be amalgamated with Roman Catholics at present; indeed, there seems an amalgamation of all sects on this question." But once the sectarian division over Ireland's future within the United Kingdom reasserted itself, Bright's position hardened. Supporting Protestant Ulster, he would have no truck with what he described as the "disloyal Ireland".

In 1886 when Gladstone proposed Home Rule for Ireland and another Irish Land Act, Bright opposed it, along with Joseph Chamberlain and Lord Hartington. He regarded Charles Stewart Parnell's Irish Parliamentary Party as "the rebel party". Bright was repeatedly contacted by Gladstone, Chamberlain and Hartington to solicit his support. He was widely regarded as a force to be reckoned with and his political influence was considerably out of proportion to his activity. In March 1886 Bright went to London, and on 10 March met Hartington, having an hour's talk with him on Ireland. On 12 March Bright met Gladstone for dinner, writing that Gladstone's "chief object is to settle the Land question which I rather think ought now ought be considered as settled. On the question of a Parliament in Dublin, he wishes to get rid of Irish representation at Westminster, in which I entirely agree with him if it be possible". On 17 March he met Chamberlain and thought "his view is in the main correct and that it is not wise in him to support the intended measures". On 20 March he had a two-hour-long meeting with Gladstone:

He gave me a long memorandum, historical in character, on the past Irish story, which seemed to be somewhat one-sided, leaving out of view the important minority and the views and feelings of the Protestant and loyal portion of the people. He explained much of his policy as to a Dublin Parliament, and as to Land purchase. I objected to the Land policy as unnecessary—the Act of 1881 had done all that was reasonable for the tenants—why adopt the policy of the rebel party, and get rid of landholders, and thus evict the English garrison as the rebels call them? I denied the value of the security for repayment. Mr G. argued that his finance arrangements would be better than present system of purchase, and that we were bound in honour to succour the landlords, which I contested. Why not go to the help of other interests in Belfast and Dublin? As to Dublin Parliament, I argued that he was making a surrender all along the line—a Dublin Parliament would work with constant friction, and would press against any barrier he might create to keep up the unity of the three Kingdoms. What of a volunteer force, and what of import duties and protection as against British goods? ... I thought he placed far too much confidence in the leaders of the rebel party. I could place none in them, and the general feeling was and is that any terms made with them would not be kept, and that through them I could not hope for reconciliation with discontented and disloyal Ireland.

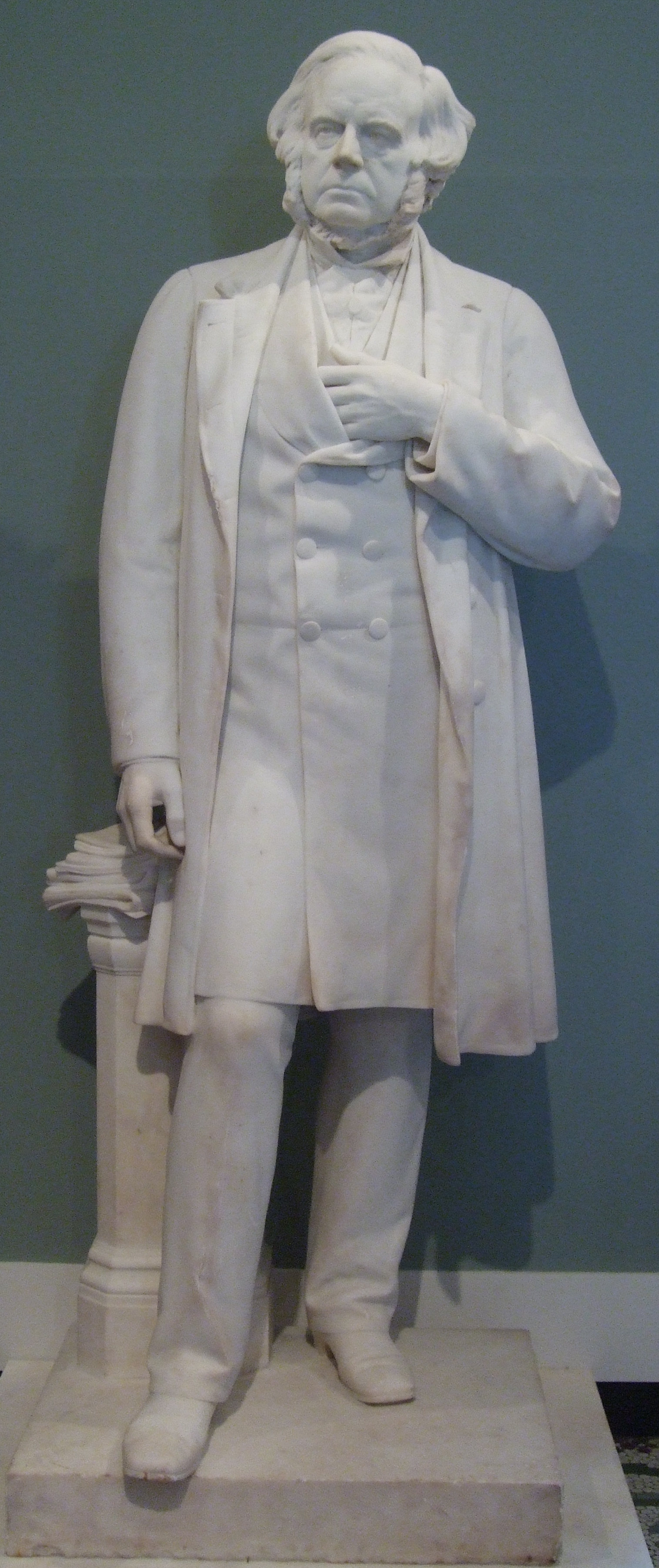
John Bright marble statue in Birmingham Museum and Art Gallery

On 8 April Gladstone introduced the Home Rule Bill into the House of Commons, where it passed the first reading without division. Bright did not enter the debates on the Bill and left London at the end of April to attend the funeral of his brother-in-law. He then returned to his home in Rochdale. On 13 May Gladstone sent him a letter, requesting he visit him in London. This date was also the anniversary of the death of Bright's wife's, so he replied that he felt the need to spend it at home. He further wrote:

I cannot consent to a measure which is so offensive to the whole Protestant population of Ireland, and to the whole sentiment of the province of Ulster so far as its loyal and Protestant people are concerned. I cannot agree to exclude them from the protection of the Imperial Parliament. I would do much to clear the rebel party from Westminster, and do not sympathise with those who wish to retain them—but admit there is much force in the arguments on this point which are opposed to my views upon it. ... As to the Land Bill, if it comes to a second reading, I fear I must vote against it. It may be that my hostility to the rebel party, looking at their conduct since your Government was formed six years ago, disables me from taking an impartial view of this great question. If I could believe them honorable and truthful men, I could yield much—but I suspect that your policy of surrender to them will only place more power in their hands to war with greater effect against the unity of the 3 Kingdoms with no increase of good to the Irish people. ... Parliament is not ready for it, and the intelligence of the country is not ready for it. If it be possible, I should wish that no Division should be taken upon the Bill.

On 14 May Bright came to London and wrote to the Liberal MP Samuel Whitbread that Gladstone should withdraw the Home Rule Bill and that he should not dissolve Parliament if the Bill were put forward for a second reading and were defeated in a vote: "... it would only make the Liberal split the more serious, and make it beyond the power of healing. He would be responsible for the greatest wound the Party has received since it was a Party ... If the Bill were now withdrawn, the whole present difficulty in our Party would be gone". He also predicted the Conservatives would gain in strength if an election were called.

At the famous meeting at the Committee Room 15, Liberal MPs who were not outright opponents of the idea of Irish self-government but who disapproved of the Bill, met to decide upon a course of action. Among the attendees were Chamberlain, and Bright wrote to on 31 May:

My present intention is to vote against the Second Reading, not having spoken in the debate. I am not willing to have my view of the bill or Bills in doubt. But I am not willing to take the responsibility of advising others as to their course. If they can content themselves with abstaining from the division, I shall be glad. they will render a greater service by preventing the threatened dissolution than by compelling it ... a small majority for the Bill may be almost as good as its defeat and may save the country from the heavy sacrifice of a general election. I wish I could join you, but I cannot now change the path I have taken from the beginning of this unhappy discussion ...P.S.—If you think it of any use you may read this note to your friends.

Chamberlain read aloud this letter to the meeting and he later wrote that Bright's "announcement that he intended to vote against the Second Reading undoubtedly affected the decision" and that the meeting ended by unanimously agreeing to vote against the Bill. Bright wrote to Chamberlain on 1 June that he was surprised at the meeting's decision because his letter "was intended to make it more easy for and your friends to abstain from voting in the coming division". On 7 June the Home Rule Bill was defeated by 341 votes to 311, Bright voting against it. Gladstone dissolved Parliament.

During the subsequent general election campaign, Bright delivered only one speech, to his constituents on 1 July, in which he opposed Irish Home Rule. He exhorted his countrymen to put the Union above the Liberal Party. This speech was generally viewed by the Gladstonian Liberals as having a decisive effect on their defeat. John Morley wrote that "The heaviest and most telling attack came from Mr. Bright, who had up to now in public been studiously silent. Every word, as they said of Daniel Webster, seemed to weigh a pound. His arguments were mainly those of his letter already given, but they were delivered with a gravity and force that told powerfully upon the large phalanx of doubters all over the kingdom". The chairman of the National Liberal Federation, Sir B. Walter Foster, complained that Bright "probably did more harm in this election to his own party than any other single individual". The Liberal journalist P. W. Clayden was a candidate for Islington North and when canvassing leading dissident Liberals, he would take with him a copy of the Home Rule Bill:

Going through the Bill with some of them clause by clause, I was able to answer all their objections, and in many cases to get their promise of support. Mr Bright's speech, however, at once undid all my work. In the whole country it probably kept many thousands of Liberal voters from going to the polls, and did more than all the other influences put together to produce the Liberal abstention which gave the Coalition its decisive victory.

Bright was re-elected by his Birmingham constituents and it turned out to be his last Parliament. He sat as a Liberal Unionist allied to the Conservative Party who had formed a government after the election. Bright participated little in this Parliament, however his actions could still decide events. Lord George Hamilton recorded that when the government introduced the Criminal Law Amendment (Ireland) Bill in March 1887, which increased the authorities' coercive powers, the Liberal Party opposed it. Bright did not speak in the debate but Hamilton notes that great importance was attached to how Bright would vote: "If he abstained from voting or voted against the Government, the Unionist coalition would have been practically broken up. On the other hand if he, in order to avert Home Rule, voted for a procedure which was so contrary to his previous professions, the Coalition would receive a fresh source of strength and cohesion. When the Division Bell rang, Mr. Bright, who was sitting close by Gladstone, without a moment's hesitation walked straight into the Government's lobby".

From this point until his death, Bright did not meet Gladstone, despite their long political relationship together.

== MLA for Kennedy, Queensland: 1869–70 ==
The Colony of Queensland achieved separation from New South Wales in 1859 with Brisbane in the south-east corner chosen as its capital. By the 1860s, the perceived dominance of southern Queensland created a strong separatist movement in Central Queensland and North Queensland, seeking to establish yet another independent colony. In the 1867 Queensland colonial election, some separatists decided to nominate John Bright as the candidate for the electoral district of Rockhampton in Central Queensland, arguing that representation in the Queensland Parliament had been ineffective, so they would seek a representative within the British Parliament. However, he polled only 10 votes and was not elected.

Subsequently, on 11 June 1869, Thomas Henry Fitzgerald, member for the electoral district of Kennedy in North Queensland, resigned, triggering a by-election. John Bright was again nominated as part of the separatist protest and on this occasion won the resulting by-election on 10 July 1869. When nominating him, one separatist declared:

Let us elect a man of some weight at home, who will take our case before the Queen and try for redress. There is no man more eminently qualified for this purpose than the Honourable John Bright—a favourite with the Queen, a favourite with the nation—the representative of trade, commerce, and manufactures in the Government and the champion of liberty, and yet a loyal subject. If we can enlist his sympathies, we are right. I believe he is the man who will break the iron rod of the South and set us free; for he has already fought for the liberty of the subject, and I cannot believe he will turn a deaf ear to our manifold sorrows.

In January 1870, the separatists sent a petition to Queen Victoria requesting that North Queensland be made a separate colony to be called "Albertsland" (after the Queen's late husband Albert, Prince Consort). As Bright never visited Queensland or took his seat in the Queensland Legislative Assembly, his failure to attend parliament eventually resulted in his seat being declared vacant on 8 July 1870. North Queensland did not achieve separation and remained part of the Colony of Queensland (now the State of Queensland).

It is not known what role John Bright had in these Queensland political activities, or indeed if he was even aware of them. However, it was claimed in 1867 that Bright was an "intimate personal friend" of the then Governor of Queensland George Bowen.

== Death ==
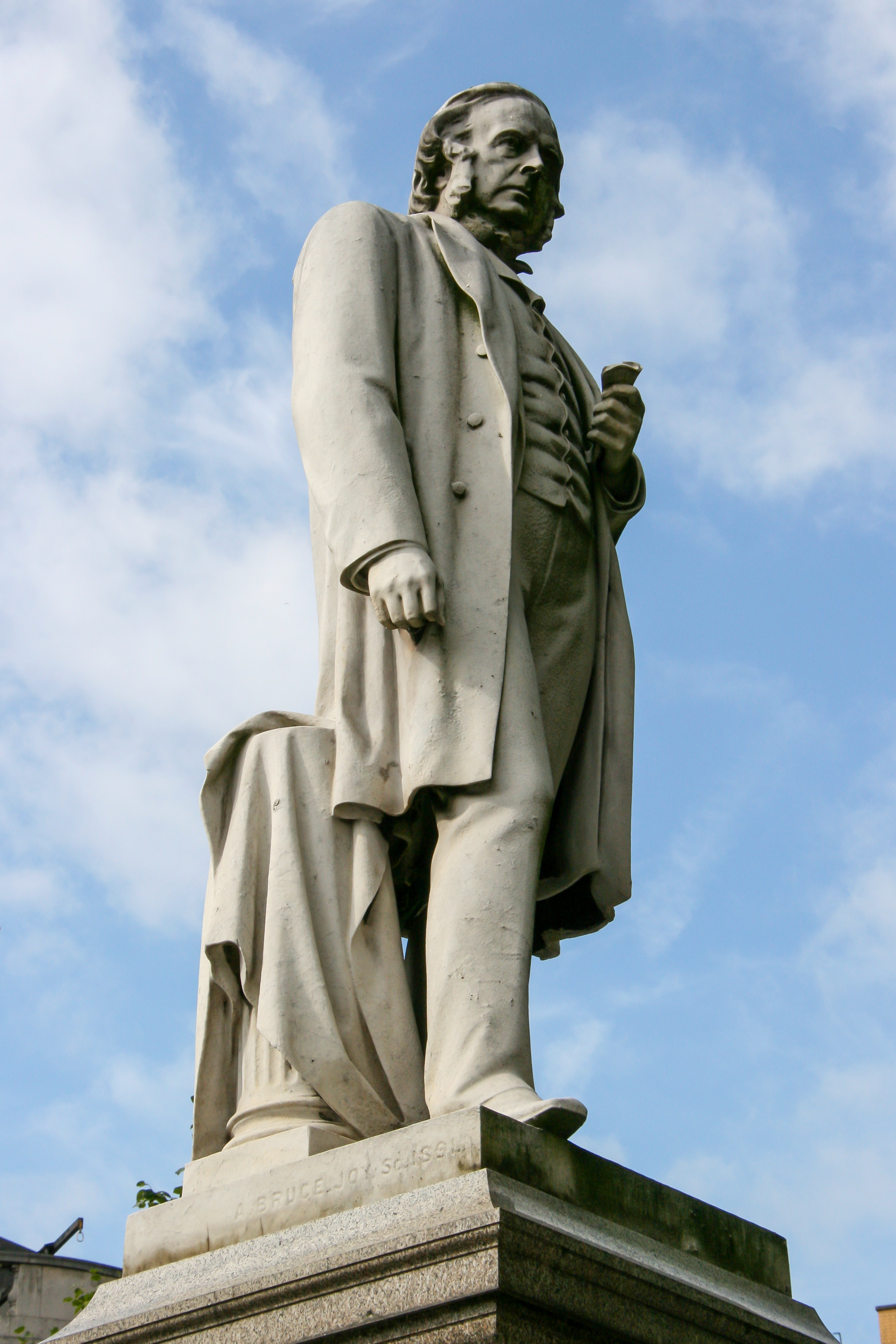
Grade II listed statue in Albert Square, Manchester

In late 1888, Bright became seriously ill and he realised the end was near. On 27 November his son Albert wrote a letter to Gladstone in which he said his father "wishes me to write to you and tell you that "he could not forget your unvarying kindness to him and the many services you have rendered the country". He was very weak and did not seem able to say any more, and I saw the tears running down his cheeks". Gladstone replied that "I can assure you that he has been little absent of late from mine, that my feelings towards him are entirely unaltered by any of the occurrences of the last three years and that I have never felt separated from him in spirit. I heartily pray that he may enjoy the peace of God on this side the grave and on the other".

Bright received many letters and telegrams of sympathy from the Queen downwards. The Irish Nationalist MP Tim Healy wrote to Bright, wishing him a speedy recovery and "Your great services to our people can never be forgotten, for it was when Ireland had fewest friends that your voice was loudest on her side. I hope you may still be spared to raise it on her behalf according to your conceptions of what is best, for while we go on struggling for our own views, there can be nothing but regrets on our part of the sharpness of division in the past".

Bright died at his home One Ash on 27 March 1889 and was buried in the graveyard of the meeting-house of the Religious Society of Friends in Rochdale.

The Conservative Prime Minister Lord Salisbury paid tribute to him in the House of Lords the day after his death, and it sums up his character as a public man:

In the first place, he was the greatest master of English oratory that this generation has produced, or I may perhaps say several generations back. I have met men who have heard Pitt and Fox, and in whose judgment their eloquence at its best was inferior to the finest efforts of John Bright. At a time when much speaking has depressed and almost exterminated eloquence, he maintained robust and intact that powerful and vigorous style of English which gave fitting expression to the burning and noble thoughts he desired to express. Another characteristic for which I think he will be famous is the singular rectitude of his motives, the singular straightness of his career. He was a keen disputant, a keen combatant; like many eager men, he had little tolerance of opposition. But his action was never guided for a single moment by any consideration of personal or party selfishness. He was inspired by nothing but the purest patriotism and benevolence from the first beginning of his public career to the hour of its close.

== Memorials ==
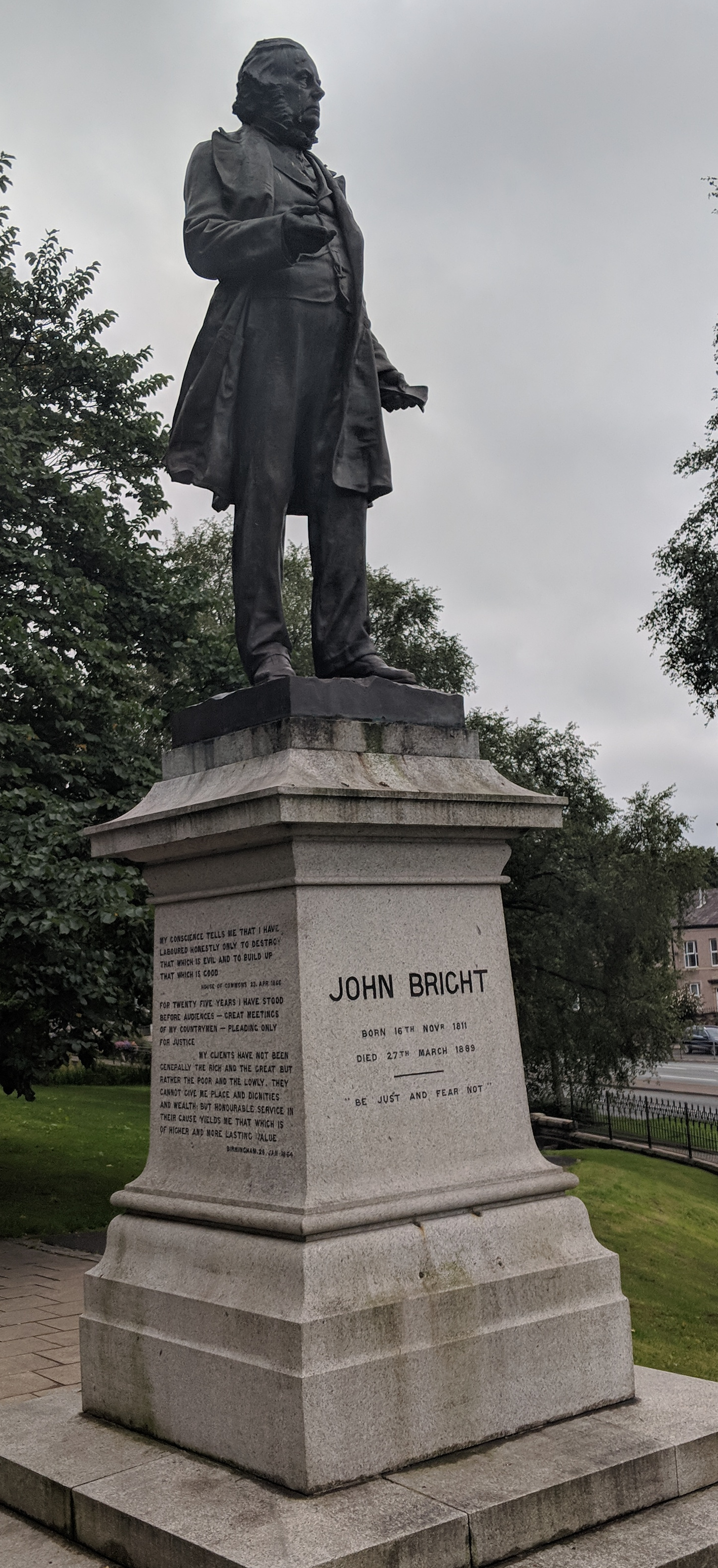
Statue of John Bright in Broadfield Park, Rochdale, Lancashire

In 1868, students of the new Cornell University debated whether to call its first literary society, "The John Bright Brotherhood" or the "Irving Literary Society". New York State's recently deceased native son received the honours, but not before Bright was inducted as its first honorary member.

The library at Bootham School is named in his honour.

In 1928, the Brooks-Bryce Foundation donated significant funds to the Princeton University Library for a collection of materials on the life and times of John Bright, in honour of the statesman. The Foundation also donated funds for an outdoor pulpit to be added to Princeton Chapel, also in honour of Bright.

His name is given to John Bright Street in Birmingham, Bright Street in Coventry, and Bright Avenue in Whittier, California, which was founded as a Quaker colony. His statue is in the collection of Birmingham Museum & Art Gallery and to the secondary school Ysgol John Bright in Llandudno, North Wales.

The town of Bright in Victoria, Australia, is named in his honour.

== Legacy ==
Historian A. J. P. Taylor summarized Bright's achievements:

John Bright was the greatest of all parliamentary orators. He had many political successes. Along with Richard Cobden, he conducted the campaign which led to the repeal of the Corn Laws. He did more than any other man to prevent the intervention of this country (Britain) on the side of the South during the American Civil War, and he headed the reform agitation in 1867 which brought the industrial working class within the pale of the constitution. It was Bright who made possible the Liberal party of Gladstone, Asquith and Lloyd George, and the alliance between middle class idealism and trade unionism, which he promoted, still lives in the present-day Labour Party.

== Bibliography ==
- John Bright, Speeches of John Bright, M. P., on the American question (1865) online
- Speeches on Parliamentary Reform by John Bright, Esq., M.P., delivered during the autumn of 1866 to the people of England, Scotland, and Ireland, at Birmingham, Manchester, Leeds, Glasgow, Dublin, and London; Revised by Himself. Manchester and London: John Heywood and Simpkin, Marshall, and Co. and All Bookselers. 1866 – via Internet Archive.
- John Bright, Speeches on Questions of Public Policy, ed. J.E.T. Rogers, 2 volumes (1869).
- John Bright, Public Addresses, ed. by J.E. Thorold Rogers, 8 volumes (1879).
- John Bright, Public Letters of the Right Hon. John Bright, MP., ed. by H.J. Leech (1885) online
- John Bright. Selected Speeches Of John Bright On Public Questions (1914 ) online
- John Bright, The Diaries of John Bright, ed. R.A.J. Walling (1930) online.
- G. B. Smith (eds.), The Life and Speeches of the Right Hon. John Bright, M.P., 2 volumes 8vo (1881).

== Sources ==
- Goodlad, Graham D. (1991) "Gladstone and his rivals: popular Liberal perceptions of the party leadership in the political crisis of 1886–1886" in Eugenio F. Biagini and Alastair J. Reid (eds.), Currents of Radicalism. Popular Radicalism, Organised Labour and Party Politics in Britain, 1850–1914. Cambridge: Cambridge University Press, pp. 163–183.
- Taylor, A.J.P. (1993) "John Bright and the Crimean War", in From Napoleon to the Second International: Essays on Nineteenth-Century Europe. Hamish Hamilton. ISBN 0-241-13444-7.
- Trevelyan, George Macaulay (1913) The Life of John Bright.

Parliament of the United Kingdom
| Preceded by Thomas Colpitts Granger and The Viscount Dungannon | Member of Parliament for City of Durham; 1843–1847; With: Thomas Colpitts Granger | Succeeded by Thomas Colpitts Granger and Henry John Spearman |
| Preceded by Mark Philips and Thomas Milner Gibson | Member of Parliament for Manchester; 1847–1857; With: Thomas Milner Gibson | Succeeded by Sir John Potter and James Aspinall Turner |
| Preceded by George Muntz; William Scholefield | Member of Parliament for Birmingham; 1857–1885; With: William Scholefield, 1857–1867; George Dixon, 1867–1876; Philip Henry Muntz 1857–1885; Joseph Chamberlain 1876–1885 | Constituency divided |
| New constituency | Member of Parliament for Birmingham Central; 1885–1889 | Succeeded by John Albert Bright |
Parliament of Queensland
| Preceded by Thomas Henry FitzGerald | Member for Kennedy; 1869–1870 | Succeeded by Edward MacDevitt |
Political offices
| Preceded by The Duke of Richmond | President of the Board of Trade; 1868–1871 | Succeeded by Chichester Parkinson-Fortescue |
| Preceded by Hugh Childers | Chancellor of the Duchy of Lancaster; 1873–1874 | Succeeded by Thomas Edward Taylor |
| Preceded by Thomas Edward Taylor | Chancellor of the Duchy of Lancaster; 1880–1882 | Succeeded by The Earl of Kimberley |
Academic offices
| Preceded by William Ewart Gladstone | Rector of the University of Glasgow; 1880–1883 | Succeeded by Henry Fawcett |
