= John Potter (Liberal politician) =

British Liberal Party politician

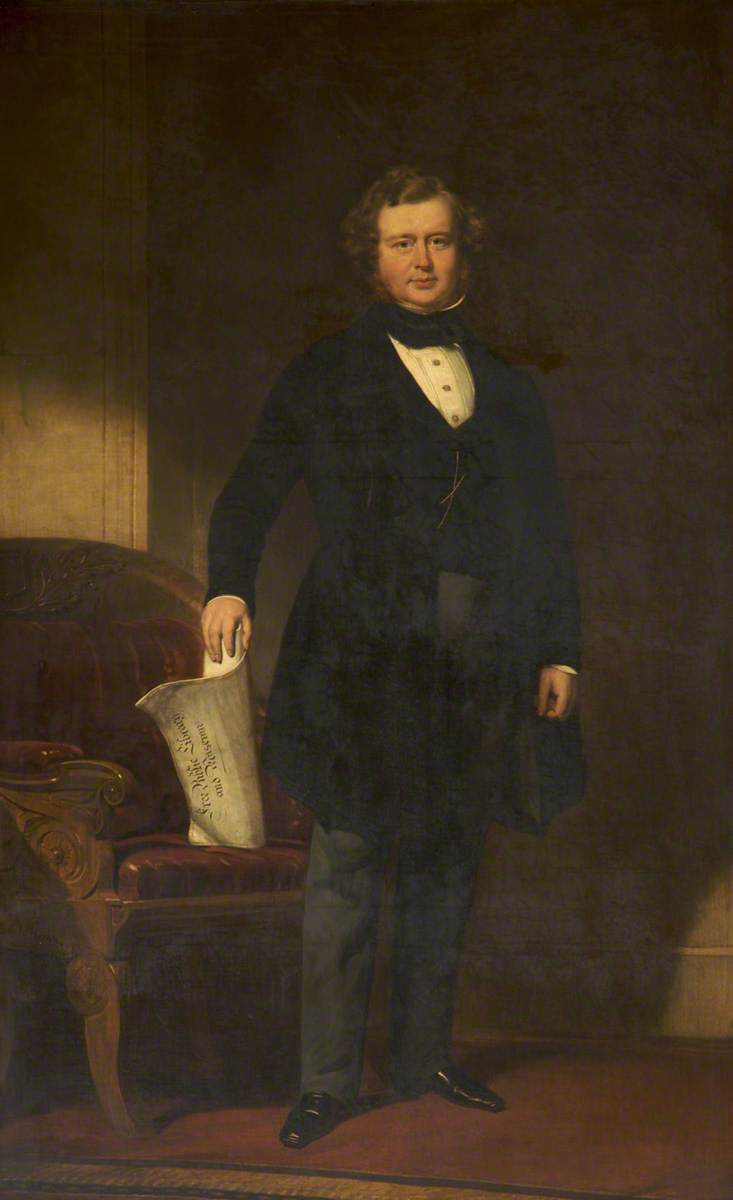
Portrait by George Patten, 1851

Sir John Potter (10 April 1815 – 25 October 1858) was a Liberal Party politician in the United Kingdom.

== Early life ==
John was born in April 1815 at Polefield near Prestwich, Lancashire. He was the elder son of Sir Thomas Potter and his second wife, Esther née Bayley. His father was involved in business and politics in the rapidly developing town of Manchester, and was named as the borough's first mayor when it was granted a charter of incorporation.

John grew up on the family estate at Buile Hill, Pendleton after its completion in 1827. He was educated at the University of Edinburgh.

== Political career ==
Potter took no part in public life until the death of his father in March 1845. He was given his father's aldermanic seat on Manchester Town Council and made a justice of the peace for the borough. He elected to serve as Mayor of Manchester in 1848, serving three terms until 1851. During the visit of Queen Victoria to Manchester he was invested as a knight bachelor on 10 October 1851. In the same year he was made deputy lieutenant of the County Palatine of Lancaster. During his term of office, the Free Library was founded—an institution to which he made several donations. In politics he was stated to be an "Advanced Liberal" in favour of the widening of the electoral franchise. He was a member of the Portico Library and continued to be a member of Manchester Town Council until his death. He was the head of Potter, Morris & Company, a large firm of Manchester merchants.

The greatest of his many contributions to Manchester was the founding of its Free Library.

Queen Victoria visited Manchester in 1851 and during the course of that visit she conferred on him the honour of a knighthood on 10 October 1851.

At the 1857 general election, he was elected as one two members of parliament (MPs) for Manchester. However, he suffered from ill health from the time he entered parliament, and declared his intention to resign his seat.

== Death ==
Sir John died in office on 25 October 1858 at the age of 43 at Beech House, Eccles. He was buried at Ardwick Cemetery, Manchester.

Civic offices
Preceded by Sir Elkanah Armitage	Mayor of Manchester; 1848–1851	Succeeded by Robert Barnes
Parliament of the United Kingdom
Preceded by Thomas Milner Gibson and John Bright	Member of Parliament for Manchester; 1857–1858; With: James Aspinall Turner	Succeeded by James Aspinall Turner and Thomas Bazley
