= Charles Worsley =

English soldier and politician

Major General Charles Worsley
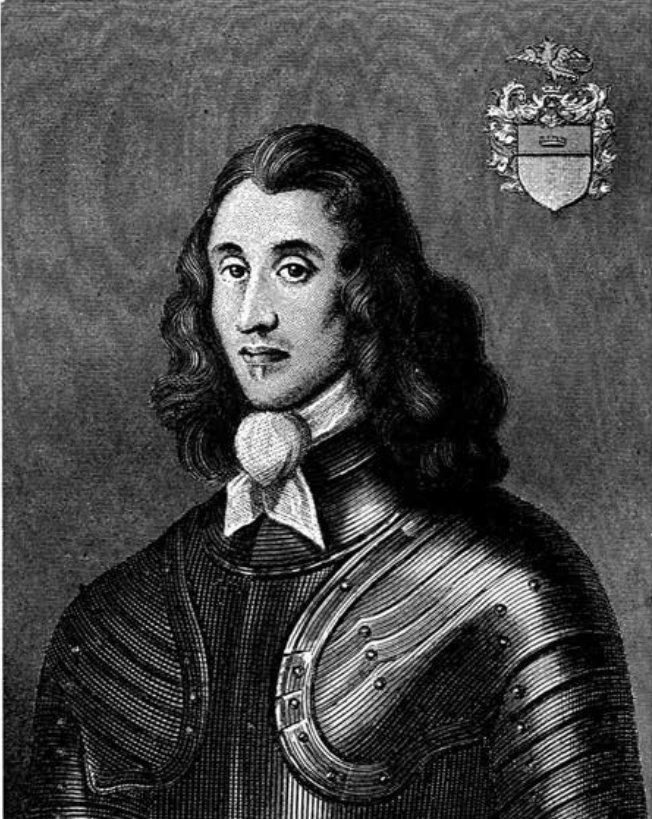
- Major-General Charles Worsley (1622–1656)
- Born: 24 June 1622
- Died: 12 June 1656 (aged 33); St. James's, London
- Resting place: Henry VII's chapel in Westminster Abbey
- Spouse(s): Mary Booth (1644–1649); Dorothy Kenyon (1652–1656)
- Parent(s): Ralph Worsley and Isabel née Massey

Charles Worsley (24 June 1622 – 12 June 1656) was an English soldier and politician. He was an ardent supporter of Oliver Cromwell and was an officer in the Parliamentary army during the English Civil War and the Commonwealth of England. He sat in the House of Commons in 1654 and governed a district during the Rule of the Major-Generals.

== Biography ==
Worsley was the son of Ralph Worsley, of The Platt, Rusholme and his wife Isabel Massy, daughter of Edward Massy of Manchester. He was a parliamentary captain in Lancashire in 1644. By 1650 he was lieutenant colonel of a regiment raised in Lancashire for Cromwell. In 1651 he was employed in the reduction of the Isle of Man.

Worsley commanded the detachment used in the expulsion of the Rump Parliament in 1653 and took charge of the "bauble" when Cromwell ordered it to be removed.

In 1654, Worsley was elected the first Member of Parliament for Manchester in the First Protectorate Parliament. During the Rule of the Major-Generals, Worsley governed a district consisting of Cheshire, Lancashire and Staffordshire. He confiscated the property of Royalists, put Roman Catholics in jail, suppressed horse-racing, and promoted the public good according to his own ideals. He died suddenly in 1656 at the age of 33 and was buried in the Henry VII Chapel in Westminster Abbey.

== The Worsley family of Platt Hall ==
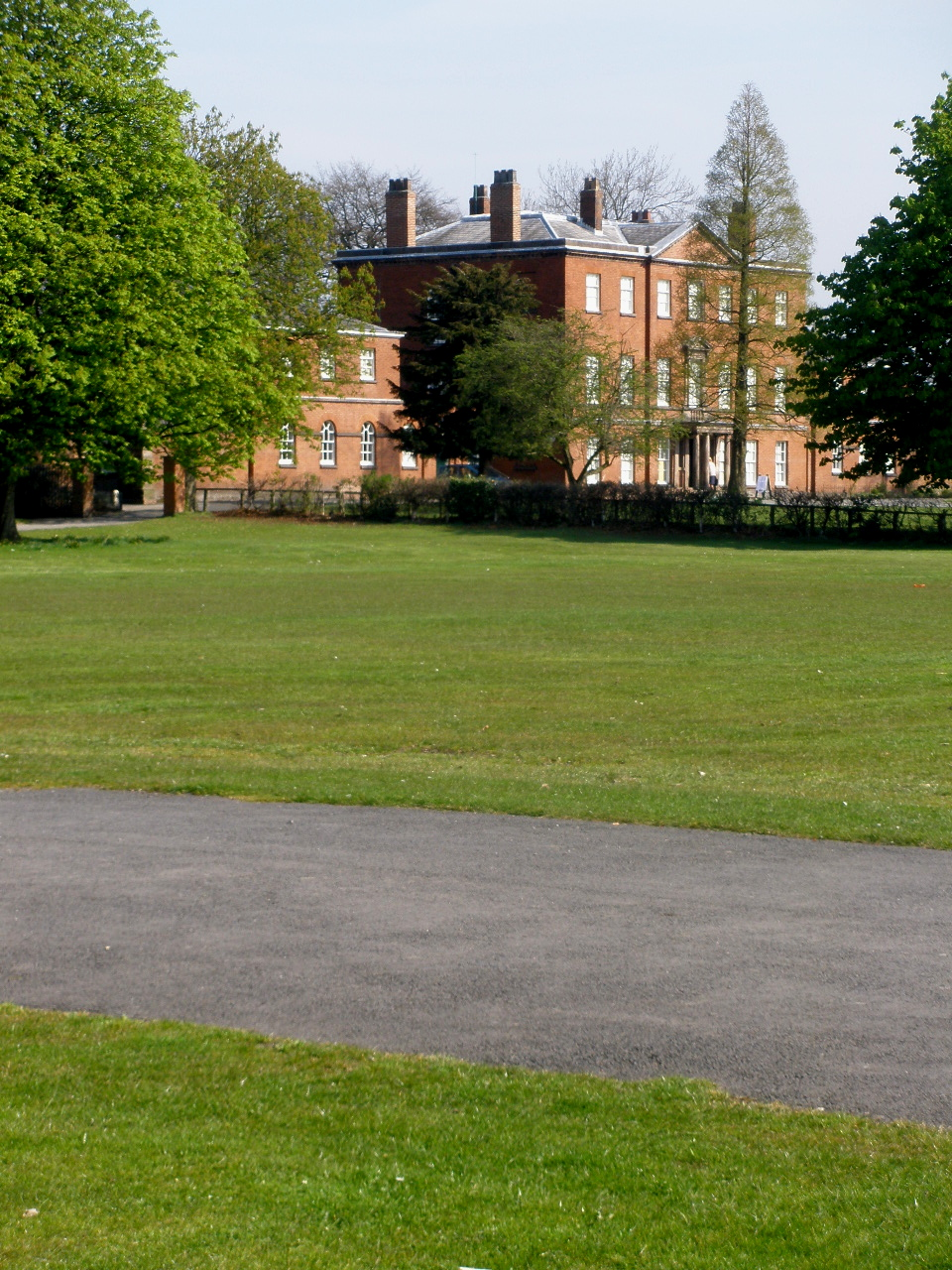
Platt Hall and Costume Museum

A branch of the Worsley family settled at Platt Hall, Lancashire, now in Fallowfield in the City of Manchester. The hall was bought by Ralph Worsley (1625) from the Platt family. Ralph Worsley's father, Charles, was the great-grandson of Sir Geoffrey Worsley of Boothes and a kinsman of the Worsleys of Worsley Hall (from whom derived the Worsleys of Appuldurcombe and of Hovingham).

The family of Charles Worsley remained at Platt Hall until 1906, when it was sold to the Manchester Corporation, the city then encroaching on its estate. Elizabeth Tindal-Carill-Worsley, who sold the estate, was the granddaughter of Francis Sacheverel Darwin, son of Erasmus Darwin. She married Nicolas Tindal of Aylesbury, a great-grandnephew of Sir Nicholas Conyngham Tindal, Lord Chief Justice of England from 1829 – 1843. Their grandson, Group Captain Nicolas Tindal-Carill-Worsley (known as Tindal), was a bomber pilot in the Second World War and a major instigator of the "Great Escape". His son, Charles Tindal, is the current representative of the family.

== Notes ==
Parliament of England
New constituency	Member of Parliament for Manchester; 1654	Succeeded by Richard Radcliffe
