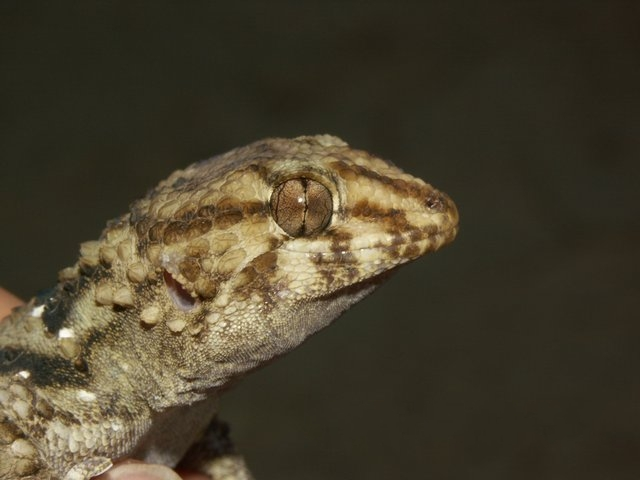

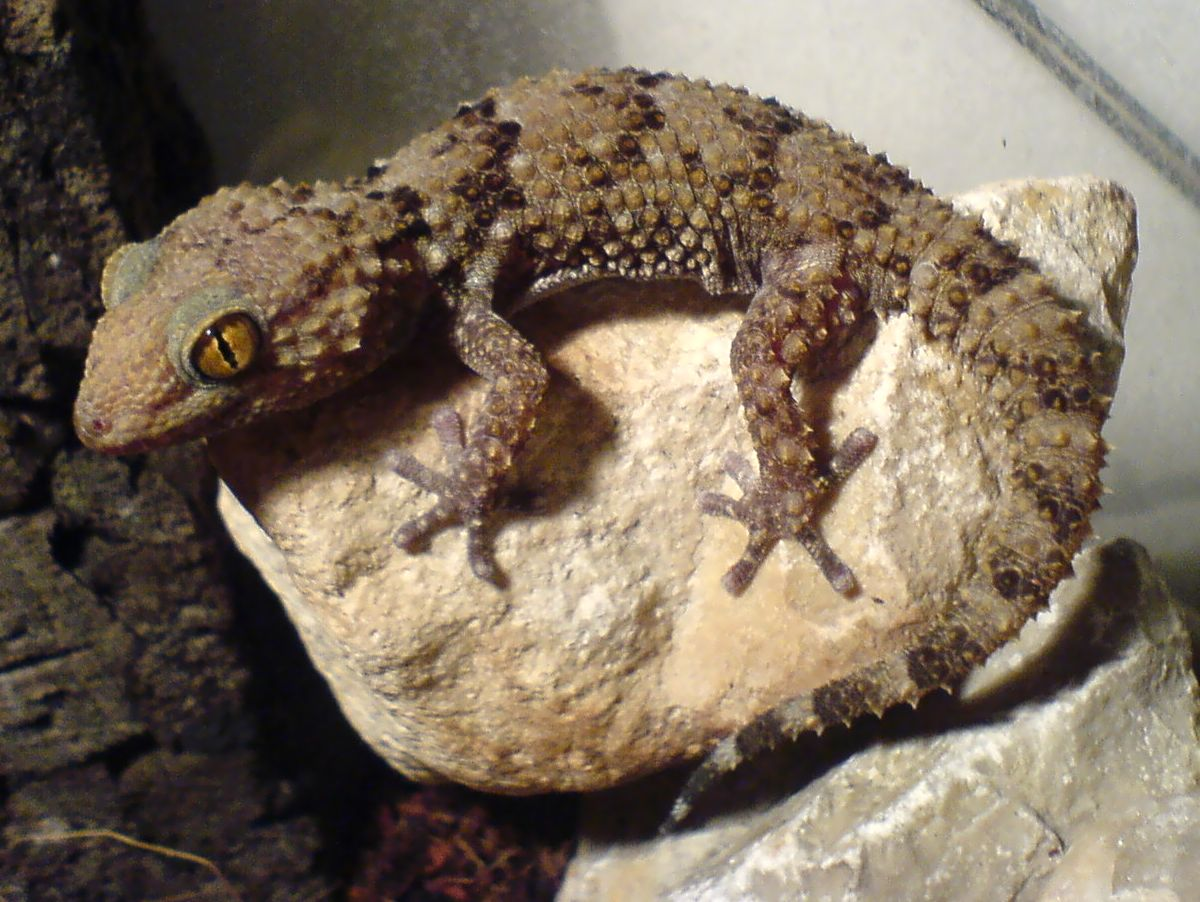

Conservation status
- Least Concern (IUCN 3.1)

Scientific classification
- Kingdom: Animalia
- Phylum: Chordata
- Class: Reptilia
- Order: Squamata
- Suborder: Gekkota
- Family: Gekkonidae
- Genus: Chondrodactylus
- Species: C. bibronii

Binomial name
- Chondrodactylus bibronii (A. Smith, 1846)

Synonyms
- Tarentola bibronii A. Smith, 1846; Pachydactylus bibronii — Boulenger, 1885; Chondrodactylus bibronii — Bauer & Lamb, 2005

= Bibron's thick-toed gecko =

Species of lizard

Chondrodactylus bibronii, commonly known as Bibron's thick-toed gecko, Bibron's sand gecko, or simply Bibron's gecko, is a species of lizard in the family Gekkonidae. The species is native to southern Africa. C. bibronii has been used as an animal model in bioastronautic research examining the effects of spaceflight on the morphology and physiology of vertebrates.

== Etymology ==
The specific name, bibronii, is in honor of French herpetologist Gabriel Bibron, as are several common names.

== Geographic range ==
Bibron's gecko is distributed across the southern part of the African continent in Namibia, South Africa, and Eswatini. It is common in South Africa, where it is one of the largest gecko species.

C. bibronii has been introduced in the southeastern United States. Populations have been found in Manatee County, Florida.

== Description ==
A moderate-sized gecko, C. bibronii reaches a total length (including tail) of 6 to 8 in (15 to 20 cm). It has a stockier build than most other geckos. The female is generally smaller than the male. Its base color is brown, and it has a beaded pattern dorsally, with black crossbars. The male has white dots; the female may, as well. The belly is white or very light brown. The newly hatched Bibron's gecko has solid line and color patterns, while the adult's patterns are more broken.

== Behavior ==
Bibron's thick-toed gecko is arboreal and ground-dwelling. It is territorial, and males are very aggressive toward each other. Individuals can commonly be found missing appendages in the wild.

== Reproduction ==
An adult female C. bibronii usually lays two clutches per year, with two eggs per clutch.
