= Edward James (barrister) =

British politician

Edward James MP QC (1807 – 3 November 1867) was an English barrister and Liberal Party politician.

James, born at Manchester in 1807, was the second son of Frederick William James, merchant, by Elizabeth, daughter of William Baldwin. He is incorrectly said to have been educated at Manchester grammar school. He served in a Manchester warehouse for two years, where he acquired knowledge which was afterwards useful to him in conducting mercantile cases. He matriculated from Magdalen Hall, Oxford, on 3 November 1827, was a scholar of Brasenose from 1829 to 1832, and graduated B.A. in 1831, and M.A. in 1834.

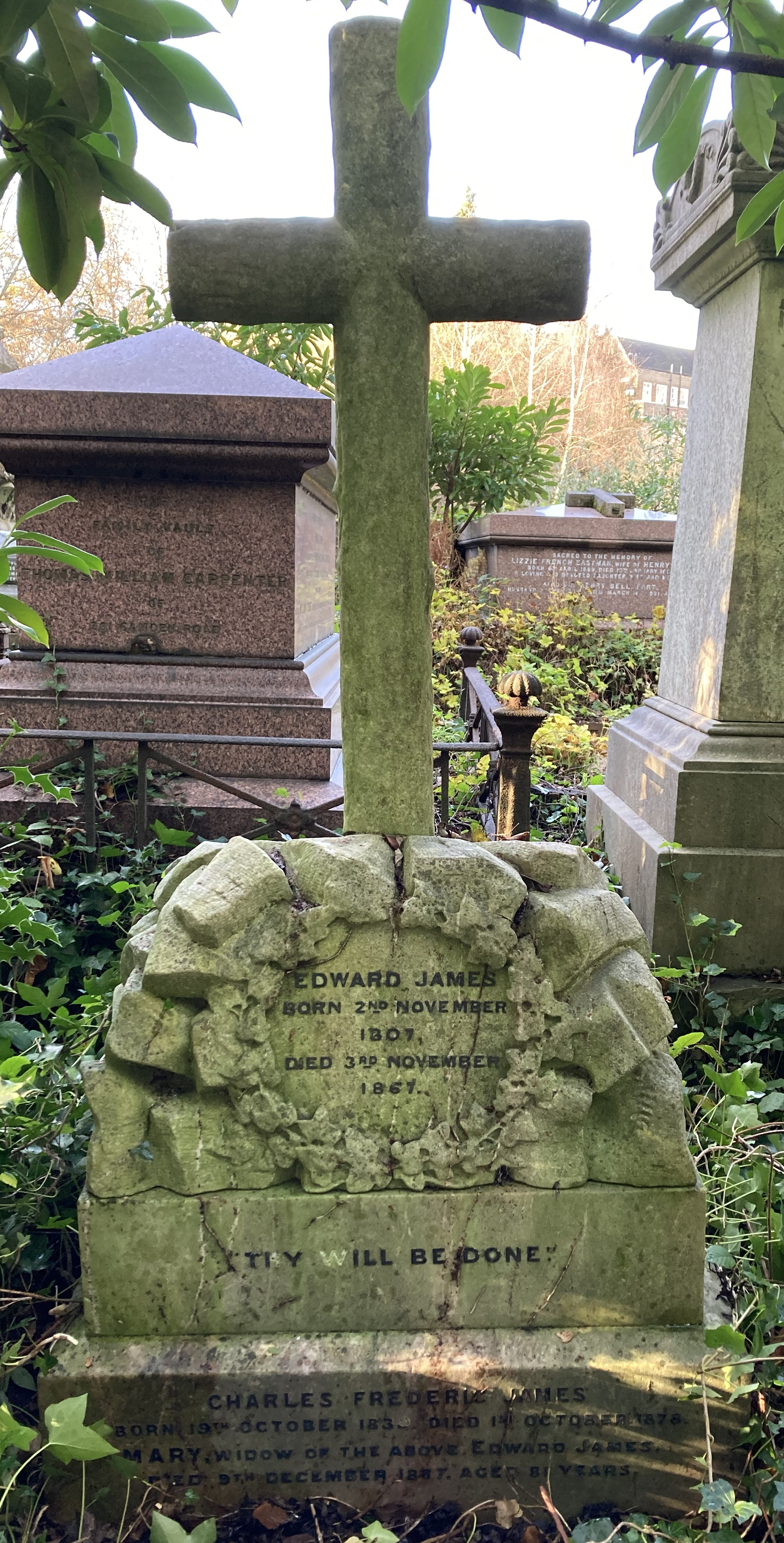
Grave of Edward James in Highgate Cemetery

He was called to the bar at Lincoln's Inn on 16 June 1835, and went the Northern Circuit, of which he became leader in 1860. He settled in practice at Liverpool, and was assessor of the Court of Passage there from 1852 until his death. In November 1853 he was advanced to be a Queen's Counsel, became a bencher of his inn soon afterwards, and in 1863 was gazetted attorney-general and queen's serjeant of the County Palatine of Lancaster. By that date he had removed to London. On 14 July 1865, after a severe contest among four liberals, he was elected at the 1865 general election as Member of Parliament (MP) for Manchester. He held the seat until his death in 1867, speaking occasionally on legal subjects and on the reform of the representation.

James was a sound practical lawyer, with a great knowledge of commercial law, especially in its relation to shipping. His arguments before the courts were always pointed, and his management of cases admirable. He was excellent in cross-examination. Too prone to take offence, he brooked no interference in court, and often had unseemly disputes with the judges.

James died of typhoid fever, while returning from a holiday in Switzerland, at the Hôtel du Louvre, Paris, on 3 November 1867, and was buried on the western side of Highgate Cemetery, London, on 9 November. He married in 1835 Mary, daughter of Edward Mason Crossfield of Liverpool.

James was the writer of a pamphlet entitled Has Dr. Wiseman violated the Law? 1851, which went to a second edition.

Parliament of the United Kingdom
Preceded by Thomas Bazley; James Aspinall Turner	Member of Parliament for Manchester; 1865 – 1867; With: Thomas Bazley	Succeeded by Thomas Bazley; Jacob Bright
