= Chondrodactylus fitzsimonsi =

Conservation status
- Least Concern (IUCN 3.1)

Scientific classification
- Kingdom: Animalia
- Phylum: Chordata
- Class: Reptilia
- Order: Squamata
- Suborder: Gekkota
- Family: Gekkonidae
- Genus: Chondrodactylus
- Species: C. fitzsimonsi

Binomial name
- Chondrodactylus fitzsimonsi (Loveridge, 1947)

Synonyms
- Pachydactylus laevigatus tesselatus V. FitzSimons, 1938; Pachydactylus laevigatus fitzsimonsi Loveridge, 1947 (nomen novum); Pachydactylus fitzsimonsi — Benyr, 1995; Chondrodactylus fitzsimonsi — Bauer & Lamb, 2005

Species of lizard

Chondrodactylus fitzsimonsi, also known commonly as the button-scaled gecko, FitzSimons' thick-toed gecko, Fitzsimons's thick-toed gecko, and FitzSimons' tubercled gecko, is a species of gecko, a lizard in the family Gekkonidae. The species is native to southwestern Africa.

== Etymology ==
The specific name, fitzsimonsi, is in honor of South African herpetologist Vivian Frederick Maynard FitzSimons.

== Geographic range ==
C. fitzsimonsi is found in Angola and Namibia.

== Description ==
C. fitzsimonsi is a large, heavy-bodied gecko. Adults average 6.5 to 8.5 cm (2.6 to 3.3 in) snout-to-vent length (SVL). The record size is a male 9.0 cm (3.5 in) SVL. Dorsally, it is olive-colored, with four or five dark undulating crossbands. Ventrally, it is white.

== Habitat ==
The preferred habitat of C. fitzsimonsi is rocky outcrops in arid savanna or in semidesert, at altitudes of 20–1,000 m (66–3,281 ft).

== Reproduction ==
C. fitzsimonsi is oviparous.
