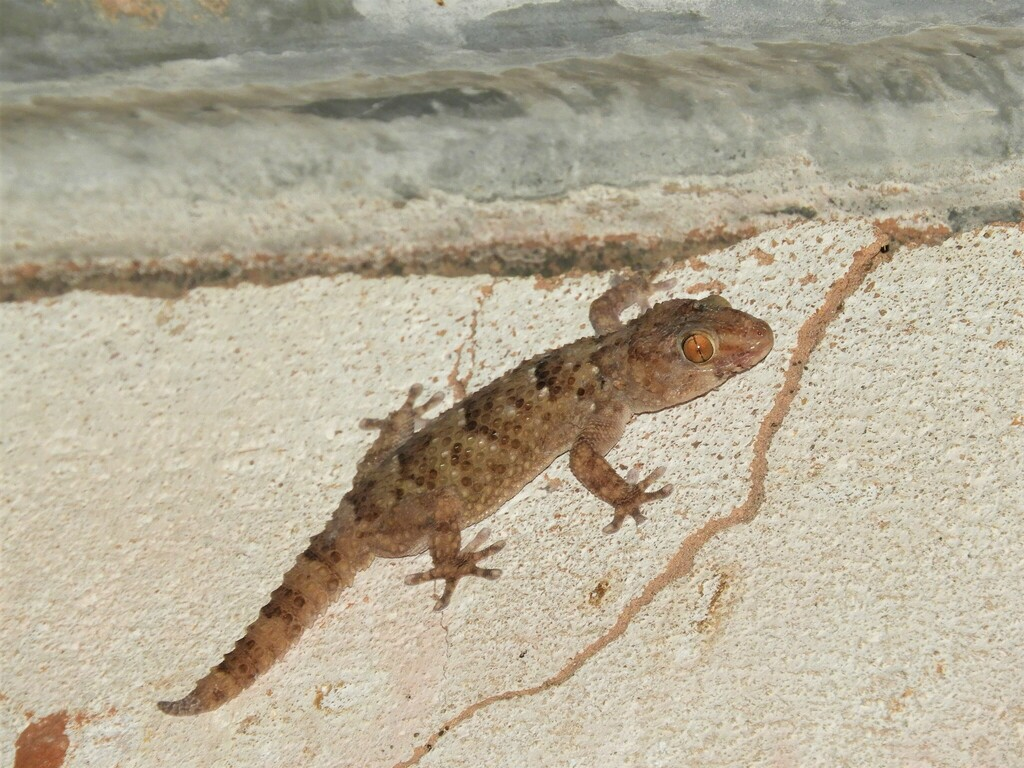

Scientific classification
- Kingdom: Animalia
- Phylum: Chordata
- Order: Squamata
- Suborder: Gekkota
- Family: Gekkonidae
- Genus: Chondrodactylus
- Species: C. laevigatus

Binomial name
- Chondrodactylus laevigatus Fischer, 1888

= Fischer's thick-toed gecko =

Species of African gecko

Button-scaled gecko (Chondrodactylus laevigatus) is a species of African gecko found in South Africa, Namibia, and Angola.
