= Thomas Milner Gibson =

British politician (1806-1884)

The Right Honourable Thomas Milner Gibson
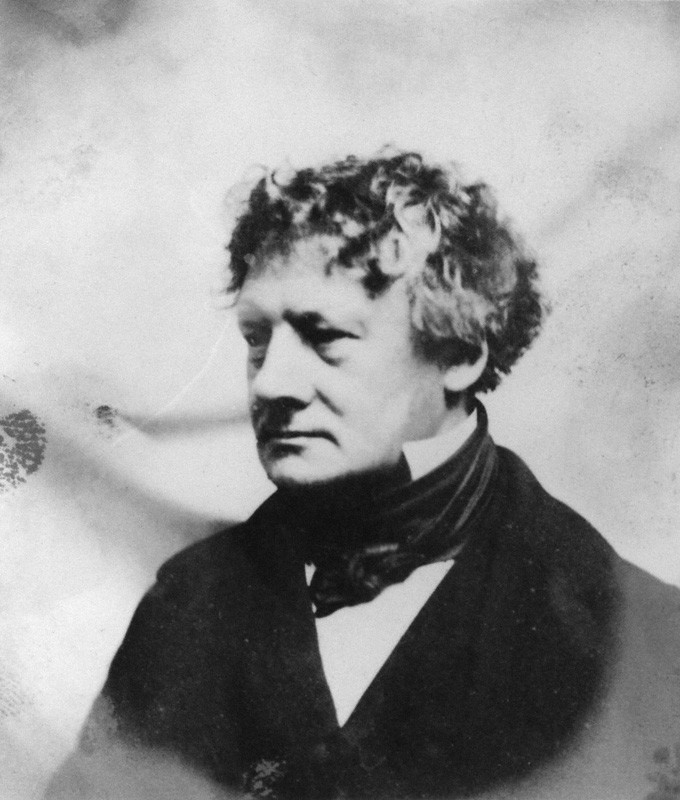

President of the Board of Trade
- In office 6 July 1859 – 26 June 1866
- Monarch: Victoria
- Prime Minister: The Viscount Palmerston; The Earl Russell
- Preceded by: The Earl of Donoughmore
- Succeeded by: Sir Stafford Northcote, Bt

Vice-President of the Board of Trade
- In office 8 July 1846 – 8 May 1848
- Monarch: Victoria
- Prime Minister: Lord John Russell
- Preceded by: Sir George Clerk, Bt
- Succeeded by: The Earl Granville

Personal details
- Born: 3 September 1806 Port of Spain, Trinidad
- Died: 25 February 1884 (aged 77) Algiers, French Algeria
- Resting place: St. Peter's churchyard, Theberton, Suffolk
- Party: Tory; Whig; Liberal
- Spouse: Arethusa Susannah Cullum (m. 1832)
- Children: Thomas Gibson Bowles
- Education: Trinity College, Cambridge

Thomas Milner Gibson PC (3 September 1806 – 25 February 1884) was a British politician.

== Background and education ==
Thomas Milner Gibson came of a Suffolk family, but was born in Port of Spain, Trinidad, where his father, Thomas Milner Gibson, was serving as an officer in the British Army.

He was educated in Trinidad, in a school at Higham Hill also attended by Benjamin Disraeli, at Charterhouse, and at Trinity College, Cambridge, where he graduated in 1830.

== Political career ==
In 1837, Gibson was elected to parliament as Conservative member for Ipswich, but resigned two years later and losing the subsequent by-election, having adopted Liberal views, and became an ardent supporter of the free-trade movement. As one of Richard Cobden's chief allies, he was elected to the House of Commons as Member of Parliament for Manchester in 1841, and, from 1846 to 1848, he was Vice-President of the Board of Trade in Lord John Russell's ministry.

Although defeated in Manchester in 1857, he found another seat for Ashton-under-Lyne, and sat in the cabinet under Lord Palmerston and then Russell from 1859 to 1866 as President of the Board of Trade.

In 1846, he was sworn of the Privy Council. Gibson was the leading spirit in the movement for the repeal of taxes on knowledge, and his successful efforts on behalf of journalism and advertising were recognized by a public testimonial in 1862. He retired from political life in 1868, but he and his wife, whose salon was a great Liberal centre, were for many years very influential in society.

== Family ==
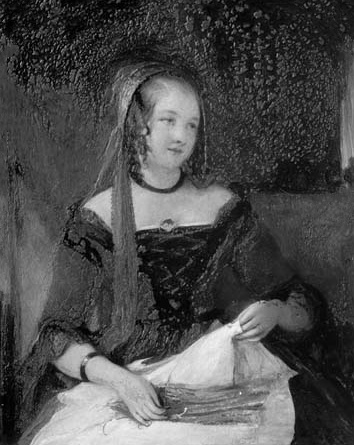
Arethusa Susannah Milner Gibson, oil on canvas, William Boxall, R.A.

Milner Gibson married Arethusa Susannah Cullum, daughter of Revd. Sir Thomas Gery Cullum, 7th Baronet of Hardwick House, Suffolk, in 1832. They resided at Theberton House, (Note: Theberton House should not be confused with Theberton Hall) Suffolk.

Gibson also had a relationship with Susannah Bowles, a servant girl. Their son, Thomas Gibson Bowles, became a noted publisher and was the maternal grandfather of the Mitford sisters.

Milner Gibson died on board his yacht, the Resolute, at Algiers on 25 February 1884, aged 77, and was buried in St. Peter's churchyard at Theberton in Suffolk on 13 March.

== Notes ==
Parliament of the United Kingdom
Preceded by James Morrison; Rigby Wason	Member of Parliament for Ipswich; 1837–1839; With: Henry Tufnell, 1837–1838; Fitzroy Kelly, 1838–1839	Succeeded by Fitzroy Kelly; Sir Thomas John Cochrane
Preceded by Mark Philips; Robert Hyde Greg	Member of Parliament for Manchester; 1841–1857; With: Mark Philips, 1841–1847; John Bright, 1847–1857	Succeeded by Sir John Potter; James Aspinall Turner
Preceded by Charles Hindley	Member of Parliament for Ashton-under-Lyne; 1857–1868	Succeeded by Thomas Walton Mellor
Political offices
Preceded by Sir George Clerk, Bt	Vice-President of the Board of Trade; 1846–1848	Succeeded by The Earl Granville
Preceded by The Earl of Donoughmore	President of the Board of Trade; 1859–1866	Succeeded by Sir Stafford Northcote, Bt
