= James Aspinall Turner =

British businessman and politician (1797–1867)

James Aspinall Turner (1797 – 28 September 1867) was a British businessman, entomologist and Whig politician.

He was the son of John Turner of Mayfield, near Bolton, and his wife, Elizabeth Aspinall of Liverpool. He was a descendant of John Turner who had fought against the Old Pretender in 1715.

Turner was a prominent cotton manufacturer and merchant in Manchester and was elected to membership of the Manchester Literary and Philosophical Society on 29 April 1836

He made his home at Pendlebury Hall and was a magistrate and deputy lieutenant of Lancashire. In 1845, he formed the Manchester Commercial Association. The association, of which he was president, was a protectionist body that broke away from the pro-free trade Manchester Chamber of Commerce.

In the mid-nineteenth century the parliamentary borough of Manchester was represented by two Radical members of parliament, John Bright and Thomas Milner Gibson. In order to unseat them the Conservative Party stood aside at the 1857 general election and Turner and John Potter were elected as "Palmerstonian Whigs". In 1858 he was appointed a member of the royal commission on army clothing. He stood down from parliament at the 1865 general election.

Apart from his business and political activities, Turner was a renowned entomologist. He founded the Manchester Field Naturalist Club, and was a member of the Royal Entomological Society. He was chairman of the committee of Manchester New College (now Harris Manchester College, Oxford) from 1840 to 1852.

J A Turner died in London in September 1867, aged 70.

== Legacy ==
Turner is commemorated in the scientific name of a species of African gecko, Chondrodactylus turneri.

Wrote "Remarks on the Linnaean Order of Insects" in 1827. See Canadian Entomologist, 1926, Vol. 58 #12, pg. 287 for review of book by Weiss.

Parliament of the United Kingdom
Preceded by John Bright; Thomas Milner Gibson	Member of Parliament for Manchester; 1857–1865; With: John Potter 1857 – 1858; Thomas Bazley 1858 – 1865	Succeeded by Thomas Bazley; Edward James
