= Manchester (constituency) =

Parliamentary constituency in the United Kingdom, 1868–1885

- Former borough constituency for the House of Commons
- County: Lancashire (now Greater Manchester)
- Major settlements: Manchester

1832–1885
- Seats: 1832–1868: Two; 1868–1885: Three
- Created from: Lancashire
- Replaced by: Manchester East; Manchester North; Manchester North East; Manchester North West; Manchester South; Manchester South West

1654–1660
- Type of constituency: Borough constituency

Manchester was a Parliamentary borough constituency in the county of Lancashire which was represented in the House of Commons of the Parliament of the United Kingdom. Its territory consisted of the city of Manchester.

== History ==
Manchester had first been represented in Parliament in 1654, when it was granted one seat in the First Protectorate Parliament. However, as with other boroughs enfranchised during the Commonwealth, it was disenfranchised at the Restoration of the monarchy in 1660.

The subsequent growth of Manchester into a major industrial city left its lack of representation a major anomaly, and demands for a seat in Parliament led to a mass public meeting in August 1819. This peaceful rally of 60,000 pro-democracy reformers, men, women and children, was attacked by armed cavalry resulting in 15 deaths and over 600 injuries, and became known as the Peterloo Massacre.

Reform was attempted unsuccessfully by Lord John Russell, whose bills in 1828 and 1830 were rejected by the Commons. The city was finally enfranchised by the Reform Act 1832, and at the 1832 general election, Manchester returned two Members of Parliament (MPs). The Reform Act 1867 increased this in 1868 to three Members of Parliament.

Under the Redistribution of Seats Act 1885, the constituency was abolished with effect from the 1885 general election, when the city was split into six new single-member divisions: East, North, North East, North West, South, and South West.

== Members of Parliament ==
=== MPs 1654–1660 ===
Election	First member
1654	Charles Worsley
1656	Richard Radcliffe

=== MPs 1832–1885 ===
Election	First member	First party	Second member	Second party	Third member	Third party
1832	Mark Philips	Whig	Charles Poulett-Thomson	Whig	2 seats until 1868; 3 seats from 1868 to 1885	
1839 by-election	Mark Philips	Whig	Robert Hyde Greg	Whig	2 seats until 1868; 3 seats from 1868 to 1885	
1841	Mark Philips	Whig	Thomas Milner Gibson	Radical	2 seats until 1868; 3 seats from 1868 to 1885	
1847	John Bright	Radical	Thomas Milner Gibson	Radical	2 seats until 1868; 3 seats from 1868 to 1885	
1857	John Potter	Whig	James Aspinall Turner	Whig	2 seats until 1868; 3 seats from 1868 to 1885	
1858 by-election	Thomas Bazley	Whig	James Aspinall Turner	Whig	2 seats until 1868; 3 seats from 1868 to 1885	
1859	Thomas Bazley	Liberal	James Aspinall Turner	Liberal	2 seats until 1868; 3 seats from 1868 to 1885	
1865	Thomas Bazley	Liberal	Edward James	Liberal	2 seats until 1868; 3 seats from 1868 to 1885	
1867 by-election	Thomas Bazley	Liberal	Jacob Bright	Liberal	2 seats until 1868; 3 seats from 1868 to 1885	
1868	Thomas Bazley	Liberal	Jacob Bright	Liberal	Hugh Birley	Conservative
1874	Thomas Bazley	Liberal	William Romaine Callender	Conservative	Hugh Birley	Conservative
1876 by-election	Thomas Bazley	Liberal	Jacob Bright	Liberal	Hugh Birley	Conservative
1880	John Slagg	Liberal	Jacob Bright	Liberal	Hugh Birley	Conservative
1883 by-election	John Slagg	Liberal	Jacob Bright	Liberal	William Houldsworth	Conservative
1885	Constituency abolished (1885)					

== Elections ==
=== Elections in the 1880s ===
By-election, 6 Oct 1883: Manchester
Party	Candidate	Votes	%	±%
Conservative	William Houldsworth	18,188	74.5	+29.4
Liberal	Richard Pankhurst	6,216	25.5	−29.4
Majority		11,972	49.0	N/A
Turnout		24,404	46.2	−27.8 (est)
Registered electors		52,831		
Conservative hold		Swing	+29.4	

- Caused by Birley's death.

General election 1880: Manchester (3 seats)
Party	Candidate	Votes	%	±%
Liberal	John Slagg	24,959	27.5	+2.6
Liberal	Jacob Bright	24,789	27.4	+3.3
Conservative	Hugh Birley	20,594	22.7	−3.0
Conservative	William Houldsworth	20,268	22.4	−2.9
Majority		4,521	5.0	N/A
Turnout		45,305 (est)	74.0 (est)	+9.5
Registered electors		61,234		
Liberal hold		Swing		
Liberal gain from Conservative		Swing		
Conservative hold		Swing		

=== Elections in the 1870s ===
By-election, 19 Feb 1876: Manchester
Party	Candidate	Votes	%	±%
Liberal	Jacob Bright	22,770	52.0	+3.0
Conservative	Francis Powell	20,985	48.0	−3.0
Majority		1,785	4.0	N/A
Turnout		43,755	70.5	+6.0
Registered electors		62,074		
Liberal gain from Conservative		Swing	+3.0	

- Caused by Callender's death.

General election 1874: Manchester (3 seats)
Party	Candidate	Votes	%	±%
Conservative	Hugh Birley	19,984	25.7	+4.1
Conservative	William Romaine Callender	19,649	25.3	+7.6
Liberal	Thomas Bazley	19,325	24.9	+3.3
Liberal	Jacob Bright	18,727	24.1	+5.8
Majority		922	1.2	N/A
Turnout		38,843 (est)	64.5 (est)	+5.2
Registered electors		60,222		
Conservative hold		Swing	−0.2	
Conservative gain from Liberal		Swing	+1.5	
Liberal hold		Swing	−1.3	

=== Elections in the 1860s ===
General election 1868: Manchester (3 seats)
Party	Candidate	Votes	%	±%
Conservative	Hugh Birley	15,486	21.6	N/A
Liberal	Thomas Bazley	14,192	19.8	−12.6
Liberal	Jacob Bright	13,154	18.3	−4.5
Conservative	Joseph Hoare	12,684	17.7	N/A
Liberal	Ernest Charles Jones	10,662	14.9	N/A
Liberal	Mitchell Henry	5,236	7.3	N/A
Turnout		28,620 (est)	59.3 (est)	+2.6
Registered electors		48,256		
Majority		4,824	6.7	N/A
Conservative gain from Liberal		Swing		
Majority		1,508	2.1	−2.5
Liberal hold		Swing		
Liberal win (new seat)				

- Seat increased to three members.

By-election, 27 November 1867: Manchester
Party	Candidate	Votes	%	±%
Liberal	Jacob Bright	8,160	53.6	+30.8
Conservative	John Marsland Bennett	6,420	42.2	New
Liberal	Mitchell Henry	643	4.2	N/A
Majority		1,740	11.4	+6.8
Turnout		15,223	70.7	+14.0
Registered electors		21,542		
Liberal hold		Swing	N/A	

- James' death caused a by-election. Bright was an advanced Liberal, and Henry was a Whig liberal.

General election 1865: Manchester (2 seats)
Party	Candidate	Votes	%	±%
Liberal	Thomas Bazley	7,909	32.4	+2.8
Liberal	Edward James	6,698	27.4	N/A
Liberal	Jacob Bright	5,562	22.8	N/A
Liberal	Abel Heywood	4,242	17.4	−4.0
Majority		1,136	4.6	−2.7
Turnout		12,206 (est)	56.7 (est)	−12.8
Registered electors		21,542		
Liberal hold		Swing	N/A	
Liberal hold		Swing	N/A	

=== Elections in the 1850s ===
General election 1859: Manchester (2 seats)
Party	Candidate	Votes	%	±%
Liberal	Thomas Bazley	7,545	29.6	−1.1
Liberal	James Aspinall Turner	7,300	28.6	−0.2
Liberal	Abel Heywood	5,448	21.4	N/A
Conservative	Joseph Denman	5,201	20.4	New
Majority		1,852	7.2	−1.1
Turnout		12,747 (est)	69.5 (est)	−6.1
Registered electors		18,334		
Liberal hold		Swing		
Liberal hold		Swing		

By-election, 17 November 1858: Manchester
Party	Candidate	Votes	%	±%
Whig	Thomas Bazley	Unopposed		
Whig hold				

- Caused by Potter's death.

General election 1857: Manchester (2 seats)
Party	Candidate	Votes	%	±%
Whig	John Potter	8,368	30.7	
Whig	James Aspinall Turner	7,854	28.8	
Radical	Thomas Milner Gibson	5,588	20.5	−8.9
Radical	John Bright	5,458	20.0	−8.0
Majority		2,396	8.8	N/A
Turnout		13,634 (est)	75.6 (est)	+5.3
Registered electors		18,044		
Whig gain from Radical		Swing		
Whig hold		Swing		

General election 1852: Manchester (2 seats)
Party	Candidate	Votes	%	±%
Whig	Thomas Milner Gibson	5,762	29.4	N/A
Radical	John Bright	5,475	28.0	N/A
Conservative	George Loch	4,364	22.3	New
Conservative	Joseph Denman	3,969	20.3	New
Majority		1,111	5.7	N/A
Turnout		9,785 (est)	70.3 (est)	N/A
Registered electors		13,921		
Radical hold		Swing	N/A	
Radical hold		Swing	N/A	

=== Elections in the 1840s ===
General election 1847: Manchester (2 seats)
Party	Candidate	Votes	%	±%
Radical	John Bright	Unopposed		
Radical	Thomas Milner Gibson	Unopposed		
Registered electors		12,841		
Radical hold				
Radical gain from Whig				

By-election, 13 July 1846: Manchester
Party	Candidate	Votes	%	±%
Radical	Thomas Milner Gibson	Unopposed		
Radical hold				

- Caused by Gibson's appointment as Vice-President of the Board of Trade

General election 1841: Manchester (2 seats)
Party	Candidate	Votes	%	±%
Whig	Mark Philips	3,695	28.3	−49.3
Radical	Thomas Milner Gibson	3,575	27.3	N/A
Conservative	George Murray	3,115	23.8	+12.6
Conservative	William Entwisle	2,692	20.6	+9.4
Turnout		6,539 (est)	60.4 (est)	c. +5.5
Registered electors		10,818		
Majority		120	1.0	−13.4
Whig hold		Swing	−31.0	
Majority		460	3.5	N/A
Radical gain from Whig		Swing		

=== Elections in the 1830s ===
By-election, 7 September 1839: Manchester
Party	Candidate	Votes	%	±%
Whig	Robert Hyde Greg	3,096	50.5	−27.1
Conservative	George Murray	2,969	48.4	+26.0
Radical	Thomas Perronet Thompson	63	1.0	N/A
Majority		127	2.1	−12.3
Turnout		6,128	54.8	−0.1
Registered electors		11,185		
Whig hold		Swing	−26.6	

- Caused by Poulett-Thomson's resignation after being appointed Governor-General of Canada

General election 1837: Manchester (2 seats)
Party	Candidate	Votes	%	±%
Whig	Charles Poulett-Thomson	4,158	40.8	+6.0
Whig	Mark Philips	3,750	36.8	+4.0
Conservative	William Ewart Gladstone	2,281	22.4	−3.9
Majority		1,469	14.4	+7.9
Turnout		6,146	54.9	−11.5
Registered electors		11,185		
Whig hold		Swing	+4.0	
Whig hold		Swing	+3.0	

By-election, 30 April 1835: Manchester
Party	Candidate	Votes	%	±%
Whig	Charles Poulett-Thomson	3,183	63.4	−4.2
Conservative	Benjamin Braidley	1,837	36.6	+10.3
Majority		1,346	26.8	+20.3
Turnout		5,020	59.5	−6.9
Registered electors		8,432		
Whig hold		Swing	−4.7	

- Caused by Poulett-Thomson's appointment as President of the Board of Trade

General election 1835: Manchester (2 seats)
Party	Candidate	Votes	%	±%
Whig	Charles Poulett-Thomson	3,355	34.8	+13.5
Whig	Mark Philips	3,163	32.8	+2.6
Conservative	Benjamin Braidley	2,535	26.3	+10.2
Radical	Charles Wolseley	583	6.1	−7.4
Majority		628	6.5	+4.1
Turnout		5,595	66.4	−11.9
Registered electors		8,432		
Whig hold		Swing	+8.6	
Whig hold		Swing	+3.2	

General election 1832: Manchester (2 seats)
Party	Candidate	Votes	%
Whig	Mark Philips	2,923	30.2
Whig	Charles Poulett-Thomson	2,068	21.3
Whig	Samuel Jones-Loyd	1,832	18.9
Tory	John Thomas Hope	1,560	16.1
Radical	William Cobbett	1,305	13.5
Majority		236	2.4
Turnout		5,267	78.3
Registered electors		6,726	
Whig win (new seat)			
Whig win (new seat)			

== Sources ==
- Manchester City Council Archive
