= List of business and industry awards =

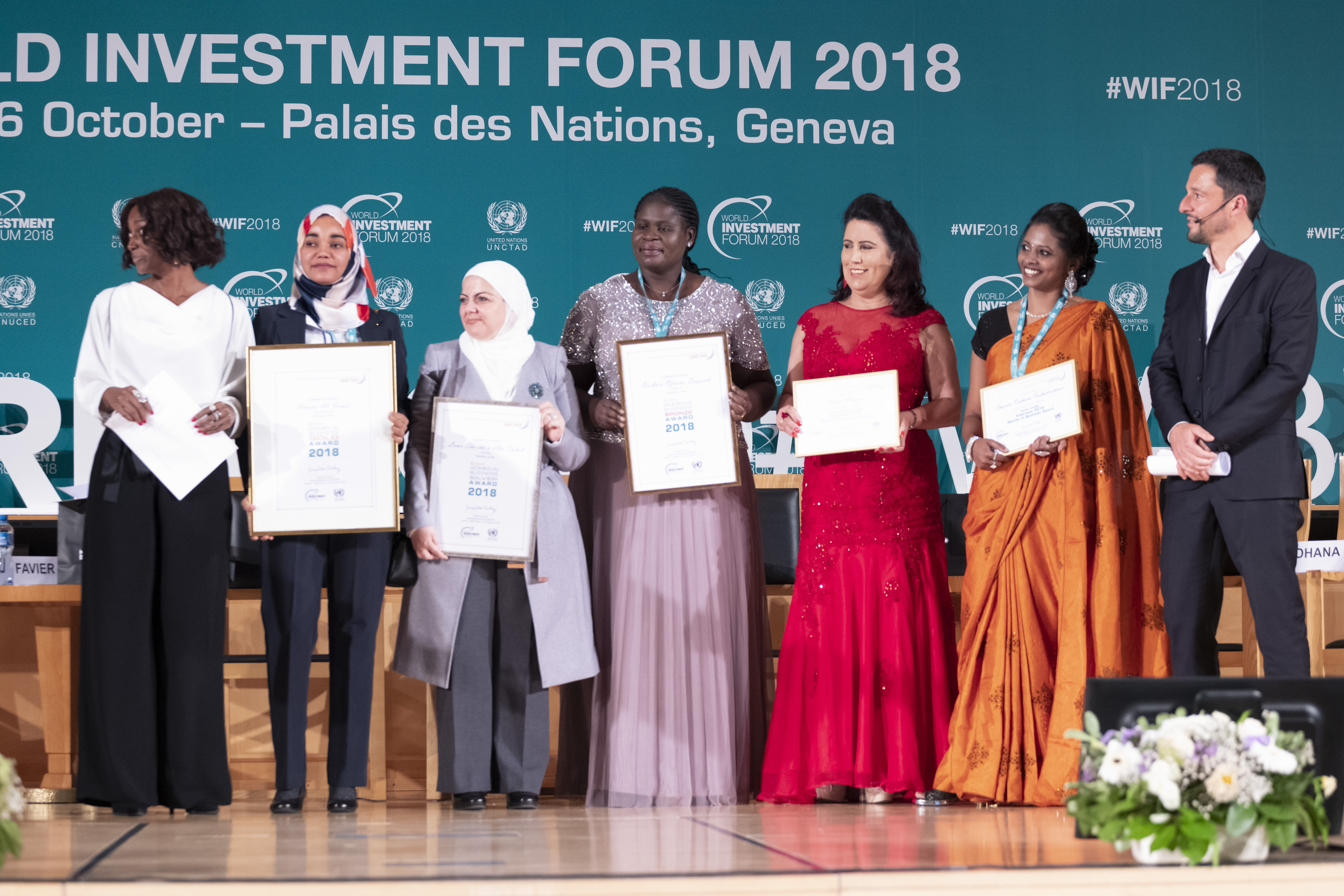
EMPRETEC Women in Business Award 2018 - winners

This list of business and industry awards is an index to articles that describe notable awards given to business and industry. The list excludes awards for the adult industry, advertising, aviation and motor vehicles, which are covered by separate lists. It also excludes national quality awards and occupational health and safety awards for the same reason. The list is organized by region and country of the sponsoring organization, but awards may be open to people or organizations around the world.

== International ==
Award	Sponsor	Notes
Applause Award	Liseberg	Amusement park whose "management, operations and creative accomplishments have inspired the industry with their foresight, originality and sound business development
Arthur B. Guise Medal	Society of Fire Protection Engineers	Eminent achievement in the advancement of the science and technology of fire protection engineering
Golden Ticket Awards	Amusement Today	Best of the best in the amusement park industry
Hotelier of The Century	International Hotel & Restaurant Association	Hotel industry award
Inavation Awards	Inavate and Integrated Systems Europe	Celebration of the creativity, ambition and technical excellence across the industry
Seven Stars Luxury Hospitality and Lifestyle Awards	Seven Stars Media Corporation	Luxury hospitality and lifestyle industry
Shots Awards	XR Extreme Reach	Awards celebrating the most inspirational creative work as well as the most successful companies and people in the industry
The Taste Awards	TCB Cafe Publishing & Media	Awards for creators, producers, hosts, and directors of lifestyle programs, series, shows, and cinema.
Thea award	Themed Entertainment Association	Projects that exemplify the highest standards of excellence and achievement, including individuals, parks, attractions, exhibits, and experiences in the themed entertainment industry.
Women in Business Award	United Nations Conference on Trade and Development	Exceptional businesswomen who have benefitted from UNCTAD's global entrepreneurship training network, Empretec, and become role models for their outstanding achievements in running micro and small businesses
World Bank Development Marketplace Award	World Bank	Early-stage, innovative projects worldwide

== Africa ==
Country	Award	Sponsor	Notes
Africa, Caribbean, Central America	Pioneers of Prosperity	Inter-American Development Bank etc.	Small and medium-sized enterprises
Nigeria	Beacon of ICT Awards	Nigeria CommunicationsWeek	Organizations' or individuals' contributions to ICT development in Nigeria
Nigeria	Future Awards Africa	Red Africa	Young people between the ages of 18 and 31 who have made outstanding achievement
Uganda	Young Achievers Award	Young Achievers Awards	Best practice and excellence in youth creativity

== Americas ==
Country	Award	Sponsor	Notes
United States / Europe	CAA Award	Personal Care Products Council	Promote and celebrate American and European cosmetic products
United States	Accounting Hall of Fame	American Accounting Association	Accountants who are making or have made a significant contribution to the advancement of accounting
United States	AGEUS Award for Individual Contribution	Annual Georgia European Union Summit	Individual who has shown exceptional success and dedication in fostering foreign economic development in the State of Georgia, USA.
United States	AGEUS Award	Annual Georgia European Union Summit	Georgia economic development
United States	Al Stohlman Award for Achievement in Leathercraft	Al and Ann Stohlman Award Foundation	Continued devotion to the advancement of leathercraft
United States	Army-Navy "E" Award	United States Armed Forces	Companies during World War II whose production facilities achieved "Excellence in Production" of war equipment
United States	Bestof.Biz Awards	Independent	Business awards program recognizing companies across national and local categories.
United States and North America	Best in Biz Awards	independent	Since 2011, the only independent business awards program in North America judged by editors and reporters from various top-tier press outlets. More than 100 categories, judges from Associated Press to the Wall Street Journal, and winners from ADP to Zappos.
United States	Chicago Innovation Awards	Chicago Sun-Times	Chicago area businesses, nonprofits, and government organizations that develop the year's most innovative new products and services
United States	Chief Roughneck Award	United States Steel Corporation	Achievements and character of a petroleum executive
United States	Columbus Atlantic Trophy	New York Yacht Club	Fastest non-stop two way crossing of the Atlantic Ocean
United States	Dream Big Award	United States Chamber of Commerce	Achievements of small businesses and their contributions to America's economic growth.
United States	E. H. Harriman Award	Association of American Railroads	Outstanding safety achievements
United States	Edison Awards	Edison Universe	Excellence in new product and service development, marketing, human-centered design and innovation
United States	Edwin F. Guth Memorial Award for Interior Lighting Design	Illuminating Engineering Society of North America	Exceptional interior lighting projects that balance the functional illumination of space with the artistic application of light to enhance the occupant's experience
United States	Goethals Medal	Society of American Military Engineers	Eminent and notable contributions in engineering, design, or construction
United States	Hales Trophy	American Merchant Marine Museum	Fastest Atlantic crossing by a commercial passenger vessel
United States	Harry C. Bigglestone Award	Fire Technology	Excellence in the communication of fire protection concepts
United States	Henry Laurence Gantt Medal	American Management Association etc.	Distinguished achievement in management and service to the community
United States	IEEE Ernst Weber Engineering Leadership Recognition	Institute of Electrical and Electronics Engineers	Exceptional managerial leadership in the fields of interest to the IEEE
United States	IRI Achievement Award	Industrial Research Institute	Outstanding accomplishment in individual creativity and innovation that contributes broadly to the development of industry and to the benefit of society
United States	Innovators Under 35	MIT Technology Review	world's top 35 innovators under the age of 35
United States	Jake Award	American Short Line and Regional Railroad Association	Railroads with a frequency-severity index rating of 0.00, thus having no FRA reportable injuries
United States	J. D. Power Automotive Award	J.D. Power	New-car quality and long-term dependability
United States	MIT150	The Boston Globe	Innovators, inventions or ideas from MIT, its alumni, faculty, and related people and organizations
United States	Malcolm Baldrige National Quality Award	National Institute of Standards and Technology	Organizations in the business, health care, education, and nonprofit sectors for performance excellence
United States	Marvin L. Manheim Award	Workflow Management Coalition	Influence, contribution, or distinguished use of workflow systems
United States	Mid-market awards	Wharton School of the University of Pennsylvania	Leadership, creativity, generosity and other qualities that represent the true spirit of the mid-market
United States	Outies	Out & Equal	Individuals and organizations that are leaders in advancing equality for lesbian, gay, bisexual, and transgender (LGBT) employees in America’s workplaces
United States	Partnership for Excellence Awards	Partnership for Excellence	Performance excellence in Ohio, Indiana, and West Virginia
United States	Petrochemical Heritage Award	American Fuel and Petrochemical Manufacturers	Outstanding contributions to the petrochemical community
United States	Railroader of the Year	Railway Age	North American railroad industry worker
United States	Regional Railroad of the Year	Railway Age	Exemplary North American regional railroads
United States	Roger W. Jones Award for Executive Leadership	American University School of Public Affairs	Leadership in the training of federal government managers and executives and in organizational abilities
United States	Ron Brown Award	U.S. president	Companies for the exemplary quality of their relationships with employees and communities
United States	Short Line Railroad of the Year	Railway Age	Short line of the year
United States	Stevie Awards	American Business Awards	Accomplishments and contributions of companies and business people worldwide. But it has been criticized for their pay-to-win model and therefore faces the scrutiny under the United States Citizenship and Immigration Services.
United States	Woodrow Wilson Awards	Woodrow Wilson International Center for Scholars	Individuals in both the public sphere and business who have shown an outstanding commitment to President of the United States Woodrow Wilson's dream of integrating politics, scholarship, and policy for the common good

== Asia ==
Country	Award	Sponsor	Notes
Hong Kong, China	Hong Kong Business Awards	DHL; South China Morning Post	Distinction for business success in Hong Kong, acknowledging the vital contributions of Hong Kong’s best companies and individuals
India	Economic Times Awards	The Economic Times	Business, corporate and government policies and economies in India
India	Garshom Awards	Garshom	Contribution of the global community of non-resident Keralites to the society they are currently part of, the nation they were born to, and to Kerala
India	VP Awards	VisionPlus (FourPlus Media)	Optical and eyewear industry
Japan	Deming Prize for Quality	Union of Japanese Scientists and Engineers	(originally the Japan Quality Medal) Individuals for their contributions to the field of Total Quality Management (TQM) and businesses that have successfully implemented TQM
Japan	Nikkei Asia Prize	The Nikkei	Significant contributions in one of the three areas: regional growth; science, technology and innovation; and culture
Malaysia	Golden Bull Award (Malaysia)		Malaysian SMEs
Singapore	SME One Asia Awards	The APF Group	Small and medium-sized enterprises
Sri Lanka	Women Friendly Workplace Awards	Satyn (magazine) & CIMA	Recognised women friendly workplace cultures which empowering and help women.

== Europe ==
Country	Award	Sponsor	Notes
Europe	Best of European Business	Roland Berger (company)	European op-companies and –managers for outstanding economical performances
Europe	European Small and Mid-Cap Awards	European Commission, EuropeanIssuers, Federation of European Securities Exchanges	The European Small and Mid-Cap Awards aim to show best practices and encourage more small and medium-sized enterprises (SMEs) to access capital markets via IPOs, the Awards is organised as part of the European Commission's SME Assembly
Europe	Fortune European Businessman of the Year	Fortune magazine	Businessman of the year
Europe	Pomme d'Or	FIJET	Superior efforts in promoting and raising the level of tourism
Europe	European Railway Award	Community of European Railway and Infrastructure Companies etc.	Outstanding political and technical achievements in the development of economically and environmentally sustainable rail transport
France	Cartier Women's Initiative Awards	Cartier (jeweler) etc.	Women entrepreneurs
France	Femina Cup	Femina (French magazine)	Women pilots
Netherlands	Philips Innovation Award	Philips	Students (or recently graduated students) who have transformed an innovative idea into a startup
Netherlands	Golden bull (broker award)	IEX Group	Best broker, best trade innovation, best fund, etc.
Netherlands	NK Horeca	Horecava	Best four course meal, best sandwich etc.
Scotland	Saltire Prize	Scottish Government's Energy and Climate Change Directorate	Wave or tidal stream energy technology that achieves the greatest volume of electrical output over the set minimum hurdle of 100GWh over a continuous 2-year period using only the power of the sea
Switzerland	Prix Gaïa	International Museum of Horology	Special achievements in watchmaking
Switzerland	Public Eye on Davos	Public Eye (organization), Greenpeace	Corporate social responsibility
Switzerland	Rolex Awards for Enterprise	Rolex	Men and women who have a spirit of enterprise, initiating extraordinary projects that make the world a better place
United Kingdom	E-Commerce Awards	Department of Trade and Industry	Small and Medium-Sized Enterprises to develop their business through the use of E-Commerce technologies
United Kingdom	100 Best Workplaces in Europe	Financial Times	Workplaces in Europe
United Kingdom	Blue Riband		Passenger liner crossing the Atlantic Ocean in regular service with the record highest speed
United Kingdom	Business Journalist of the Year Awards	World Leadership Forum	Quality in business journalism
United Kingdom	Castner Medal	Society of Chemical Industry	Authority on applied electrochemistry or electrochemical engineering connected to industrial research
United Kingdom	Ernst & Young Entrepreneur of the Year Award	Ernst & Young	Entrepreneurship
United Kingdom	Global Islamic Finance Awards	Edbiz Corporation	Global Islamic finance leadership etc.
United Kingdom	IPRA Golden World Awards	International Public Relations Association	Public relations achievements around the world
United Kingdom	International Trade Awards	HSBC	Excellence in import, export and international trade achievement
United Kingdom	International Young Music Entrepreneur of the Year	British Council	Young entrepreneurs in the music industry from the developing and transitional economies
United Kingdom	International Young Publisher of the Year	British Council	Publishers aged 25 to 35 from emerging economies
United Kingdom	Legend in Mining award	Resource Stocks magazine	Individuals who have made notable contributions to the resources sector
United Kingdom	National Pub of the Year	Campaign for Real Ale	Quality, value for money, atmosphere, interior decoration, customer service and welcome
United Kingdom	Queen's Awards for Enterprise	UK government	Excellence at international trade, innovation or sustainable development
United Kingdom	Catey Awards	The Caterer magazine	Hospitality industry
United Kingdom	World Challenge	BBC	Projects from around the world that deal with social, environmental and community issues and uses business methods to try to improve upon those issues
United Kingdom	Train Operator of the Year	Railway Gazette	Excellence among train operating companies of the United Kingdom
United Kingdom	Virgin Atlantic Challenge Trophy	Virgin Atlantic	Fastest trans-Atlantic crossing by a surface vessel
United Kingdom	World Communication Awards	Terrapinn Holdings	Excellence amongst global telecom operators
United Kingdom	World Habitat Awards	Building and Social Housing Foundation	Practical, innovative and sustainable solutions to current housing needs, which are capable of being transferred or adapted for use elsewhere
United Kingdom	World Travel Awards	World Travel and Tourism Council	Tourist accommodation, attractions and transport
United Kingdom	everywoman Awards	Everywoman	Achievements of women in business and industry
United Kingdom	Charity Film Awards	N/A	Awards for best film campaigns by non-profit organisations and charities

== Oceania ==
Country	Award	Sponsor	Notes
Australia	Australian Training Awards	Australian Training Awards Secretariat	Vocational education and training sector
Australia	Ethnic Business Awards	EBA Foundation	Contributions of migrants to the Australian economy
Australia	Telstra Business Awards	Telstra	Excellence, innovation & best practice in Australia

== See also ==
- Fintech awards
- Lists of awards
- List of adult industry awards
- List of advertising awards
- List of aviation awards
- List of motor vehicle awards
- List of national quality awards
- List of occupational health and safety awards
- Category:Businesspeople halls of fame
- Swiftnlift Media Business Awards
