= List of adult industry awards =

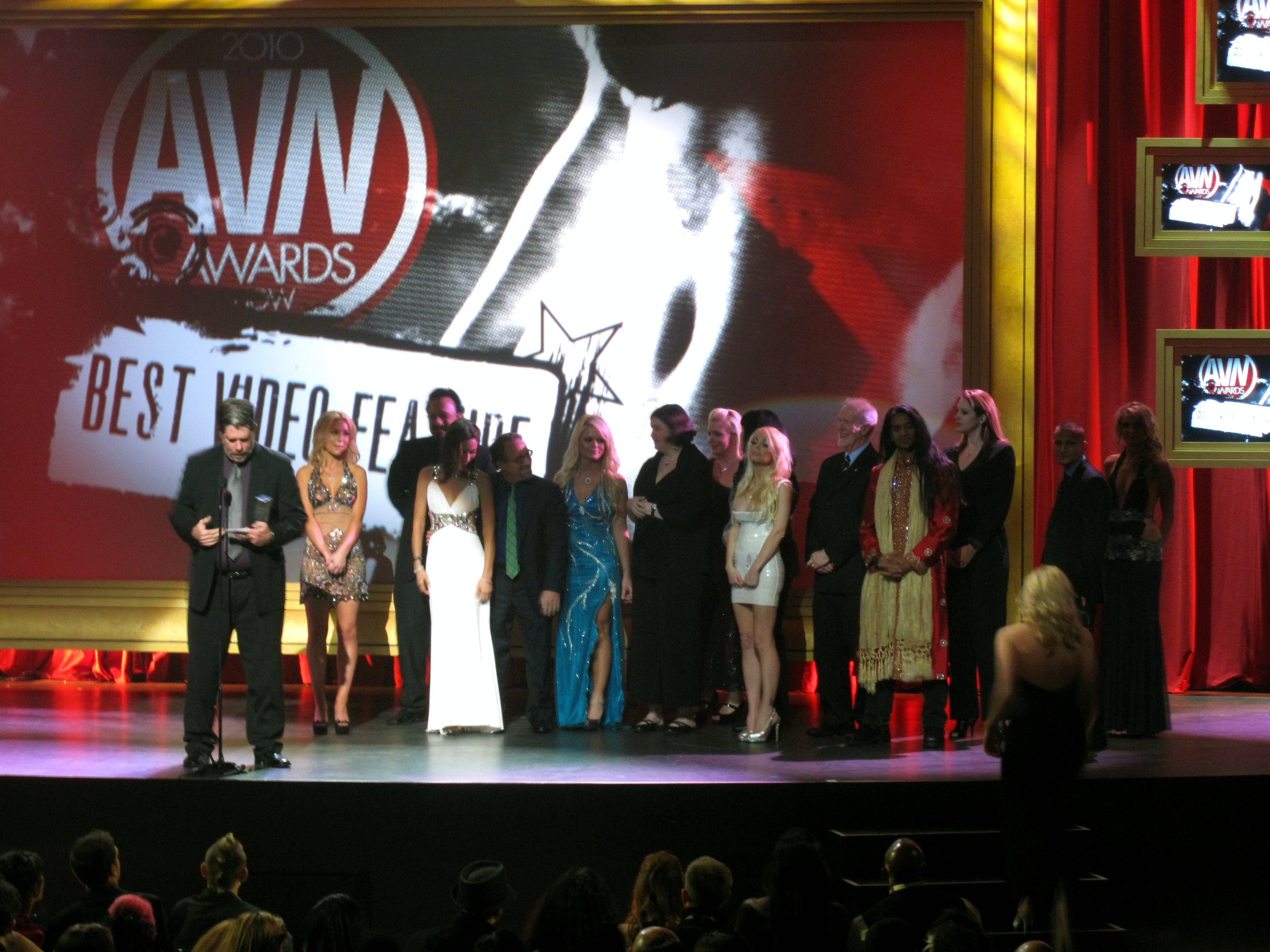
2010 AVN Awards

This list of adult industry awards is an index to articles about notable awards related to the sex industry. The list gives the country of the awarding organization, but recipients are not necessarily limited to that country. A general list is followed by lists of gay and American pornographic films.

== General ==
Country	Award	Sponsor	Given for
Australia	Australian Adult Industry Awards	Australian Taxation Office	Outstanding Australian achievements in the adult industry
Australia	X Awards Australia	Sweet Release Agency	Australian Adult Entertainment Business Industry Awards.
Worldwide	X Awards Global	Sweet Release Agency	XAWARDS Global Adult Industry Awards Network
Japan	AV Open / AV GrandPrix		Japanese adult video industry
Spain	Barcelona International Erotic Film Festival	FICEB	Various awards
Germany	Erotixxx Award	eLine, Venus Berlin trade fair	Adult film industry
Belgium	European X Awards	Brussels International Festival of Eroticism	European adult video industry
Canada	Feminist Porn Award	Good for Her	Erotica that complicates dominant representations of desire, desirability, sexuality and gender
France	Hot d'Or		Adult film industry
Switzerland	La Fête du Slip	Viviane & Stéphane Morey	Body, gender, and sexuality in art
Japan	Pink Grand Prix	PG Magazine	Film award ceremony which recognizes excellence in the pink film
Japan	Pinky Ribbon Awards	Pink Link	Excellence in the pink film genre
Germany	PorYes		European feminist porn movie award
United Kingdom	Sexual Freedom Awards		Achievement in the sexuality and erotica industries worldwide
Brazil	Sexy Hot Award	Sexy Hot	Pornographic film awards
United Kingdom	SHAFTA Awards (adult video)	Television X	Film award ceremony for pornographic films
Japan	Sky PerfecTV! Adult Broadcasting Awards	SKY PerfecTV!	Performances in adult video programs shown on SKY PerfecTV! satellite TV channels in Japan
United Kingdom	UK Adult Film and Television Awards		Adult film
Germany	Venus Award	Venus Berlin trade fair	Adult film award

== Gay pornographic films ==
Country	Award	Sponsor	Given for
United States	10th Annual Cybersocket Web Awards	Cybersocket, Inc.	Gay web content: cam sites to processors to content providers
United States	Blatino Erotica Awards	Blatino Oasis	Gay men of color who have distinguished themselves in adult entertainment
United States	GayVN Awards	AVN (magazine)	Work done in the gay pornography industry
United States	Grabby Awards	Grab Magazine	Work done in the gay adult erotic video industry

== American pornographic films ==
Award	Sponsor	Given for
X-Caliber Awards	Adam Film World	Based on votes of readers who are members of the audiences of the adult theaters
AVN Awards	AVN (magazine)	Achievement in various aspects of the creation and marketing of American pornographic movies. See also List of members of the AVN Hall of Fame
CAFA Awards	Critics Adult Film Association	Awards for those working in pornographic film during the 1980s
Erotic Film Awards	Adult Film Association of America	Adult film awards ceremony
Erotic Movie Awards	Hustler	Excellence in the erotic-film industry
The Fannys	Exxxotica Expo	Award nominees and winners selected by the fans through voting
Fans of Adult Media and Entertainment Award	Genesis (magazine) etc.	Favorite adult film stars, directors, movies, and companies
Fans of X-Rated Entertainment	FOXE	Male Fan Favorite, Female Fan Favorite, and Video Vixen
FSC Lifetime Achievement Awards	Free Speech Coalition	Adult industry businesses and professionals for outstanding achievements and contributions to the adult entertainment industry
NightMoves Award	NightMoves	Various categories
SHINE Awards	The Media Project	Those in the entertainment industry who do an exemplary job incorporating accurate and honest portrayals of sexuality into their programming
Transgender Erotica Awards	Grooby Productions	Achievement in the transgender adult industry
Urban X Award	Giana Taylor	Achievement in ethnic pornography
XBIZ Award	XBIZ	Individuals, companies, performers and products that play an essential part in the growth and success of adult films
XRCO Award	X-Rated Critics Organization	People working in adult entertainment. See also List of members of the XRCO Hall of Fame

== See also ==
- List of pornographic film awards
- List of gay pornography awards
- List of Japanese adult video awards (1991–2008)
- Lists of awards
- List of business and industry awards
