= List of pornographic film awards =

This is a list of pornographic film awards from around the world. While pornographic films may not have been around as long as other forms of pornography, they have quickly become the most popular form in which pornography is viewed. The industry has grown to become an important staple of the entertainment world as well as create a large industry within itself. The most well known awards are the AVN Awards with it being the first of its kind as well as the largest and most prestigious. The earliest awards were often obscure and taboo but now many have become so popular and mainstream that many famous stars have even appeared at the events and many artists have also performed during the award shows. Awards for the webcam model industry have also been created with the first being held in 2014.

== Europe ==
- European Gay Porn Awards
- European X Awards

== Australia ==
- Australian Adult Industry Awards

== Belgium ==
- Brussels International Festival of Eroticism

== Brazil ==
- Sexy Hot Award

== Canada ==
- Feminist Porn Award

== France ==
- Hot d'Or

== Germany ==
- Erotixxx Award
- PorYes
- Venus Award

== Japan ==
- AV Open
- Pink Grand Prix
- Pinky Ribbon Awards
- Sky PerfecTV! Adult Broadcasting Awards

== Spain ==
- Barcelona International Erotic Film Festival

== United Kingdom ==
- Sexual Freedom Awards
- SHAFTA Awards

== United States ==
- AVN Awards
- GayVN Awards
- Gay Erotic Video Awards
- Golden Dickie Awards
- Grabby Awards
- Hard Choice Awards
- NightMoves Awards
- Pornhub Awards
- Transgender Erotica Awards
- Urban X Award
- XBIZ Awards
- XRCO Awards
- X-Rated Critics Organization

== See also ==
- List of adult industry awards
- List of film awards
- List of film festivals
- Lists of films
