= Bisila Bokoko =

Businesswoman (born 1974)

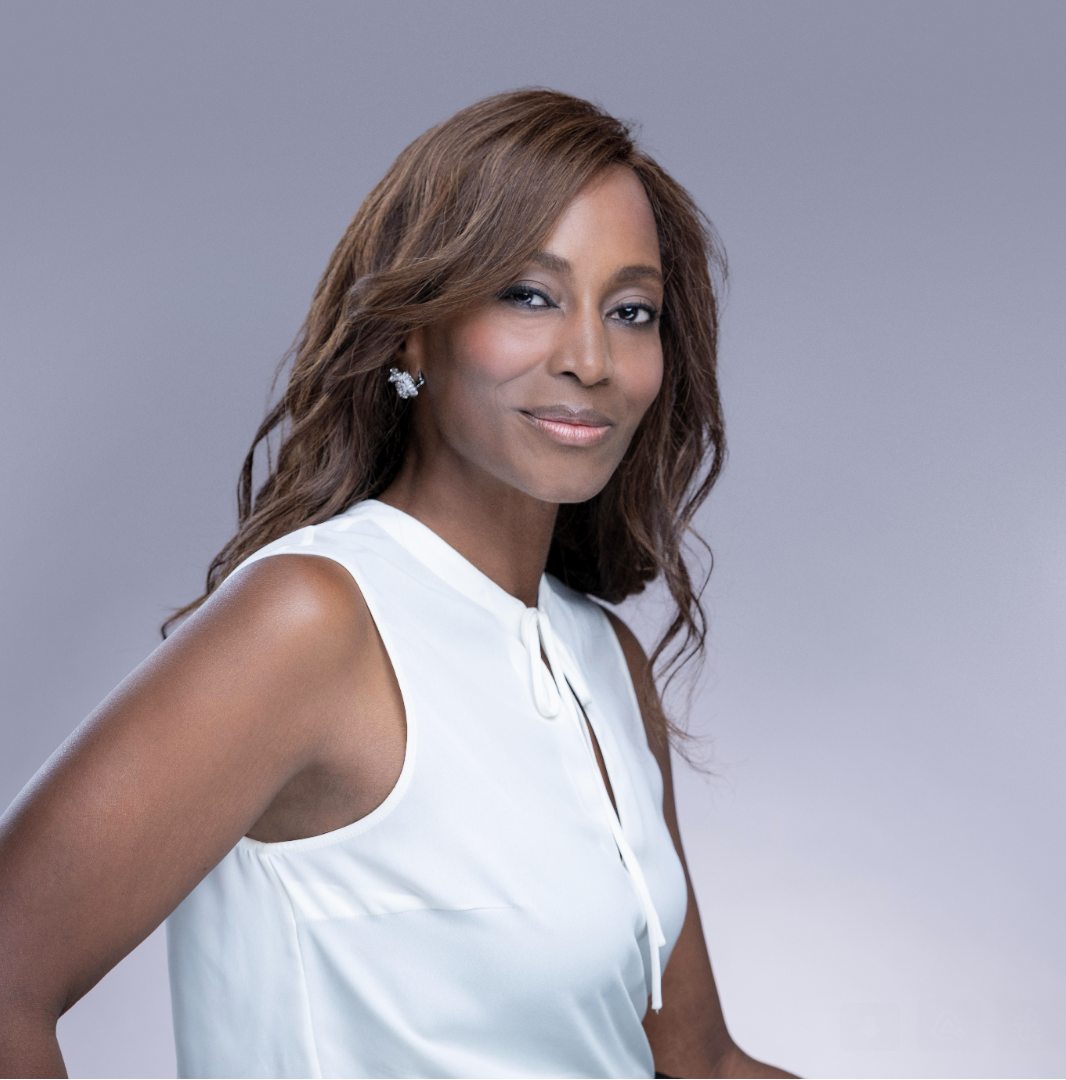
- Born: Bisila África Bokoko Toichoa (Note: In this Spanish name, the first or paternal surname is Bokoko and the second or maternal family name is Toichoa.); June 26, 1974 (age 52); Valencia, Spain
- Education: City College of New York; Colegio CEU San Pablo Valencia
- Occupation: Businesswoman
- Website: bisilabokoko.com/book/

Bisila Bokoko (born June 26, 1974) is a Spanish-born American businesswoman. She is the founder and CEO of BBES (Bisila Bokoko Embassy Services) a New York-based business development agency that represents, promotes and markets brands internationally. Prior to starting her company, she held the position of executive director of the Spain-US Chamber of Commerce in New York City from 2005 to 2012.

Born and raised in Spain to Equatorial Guinean parents, she has become a naturalized citizen of the United States.

== Personal life and education ==
Bokoko is a native of Valencia, Spain. Her family roots stemmed from the Bubi people in Malabo, Equatorial Guinea. In a Huffington Post article of January 2015, she says: "I am a cultural hybrid. I was born in Spain to African parents, became an American citizen and have been living in New York City for the last fifteen years."

Bokoko attended Universidad San Pablo, Madrid, Spain where she earned an MBA in Business Administration and Economics in 1998. That same year, Bokoko earned a certificate of British Law at the University of Manchester and completed a MA in International Relations at the City College of New York in 2003.

== Career ==
Bokoko started her career in 1997 as a legal assistant at Carbo & Martinez Law firm in Valencia, Spain. From 1999 to 2005, Bokoko was the Director of IVEX, the Valencia Institute of Export, where she helped Spanish businesses ranging from food, lifestyle goods to beverages and spirits enter the US market. Bisila Bokoko operated as the Executive Director of the Spain-US Chamber of Commerce from 2005 to 2012.

In 2010, she launched Bisila Wines, an international wine brand made in Spain. In 2012, she opened BBES, a New York-based global business development agency. The firm consults businesses in the fields of fashion, lifestyle, arts and culture. In December 2019, Bokoko was featured in the Visual Collaborative Polaris catalog, under the Supernova series for humanities, she was interviewed alongside people such as; Nse Ikpe-Etim, William Coupon and Nere Emiko.

=== Speaker ===
Bokoko is a business and motivational speaker represented by the Washington Speakers Bureau along with the likes of former US and French Presidents George W. Bush and Nicolas Sarkozy.

In October 2014, she co-hosted UNCTAD’s EMPRETEC Women in Business Awards (E-WBA) ceremony in Geneva, Switzerland during the World Investment Forum. Bokoko serves as a Spokesperson for Pikolinos, Agatha Ruiz de la Prada and The Liceu Barcelona Opera House US Foundation.

=== Author ===
In 2023, Bokoko published her first book, "Todos Tenemos Una Historia Que Contar" (Plataforma Testimonio). The autobiography highlights the ups and downs of her personal and business journey.

== Philanthropy ==
In 2009, Bokoko founded BBALP (Bisila Bokoko African Literacy Project), a nonprofit organization headquartered in New York City. With current presence in Ghana, Kenya, Zimbabwe and Uganda. BBALP is committed to promoting literacy across the continent through the opening of libraries. The motto is : “with a book, you are never alone”.

On 17 April 2013, Bokoko hosted the Pikolinos Maasai Gala at the United Nations in collaboration to support the Kenyan tribe. Through the Maasai Project, over 1,600 Maasai women hand embroider leather onto Pikolinos shoes and bags, enabling them to earn a stable income while preserving their cultural heritage and way of life.

She is an advisory board member of United Nations EMPRETEC Women Programs fostering entrepreneurship skills among women in Latin America, Africa and the Middle East.

== Awards and recognition ==
In 2019, the Hospitality Committee for the United Nations Delegations (HCUND) officially awarded Bokoko "Citizen of the World" during a New York ceremony.

In 2020, Bokoko was featured on the cover of Vogue Business magazine September issue photographed by Paola Kudacki. In the interview, she shares her leadership story moving from Spain to the US for an internship and working up the corporate ladder.

Vanity Fair featured Bokoko on their "Best Dressed List of 2023" as "The Most Elegant" alongside Marta Ortega, Miren Arzalluz, Susi Sánchez, Sofia Palazuelo, and Sassa De Osma.
