= Fensom =

Fensom is a surname. Notable people with the surname include:

- Harry Fensom (1921–2010), English electronic engineer
- Maxine Fensom (born 1958), Australian entrepreneur
- Shaun Fensom (born 1988), Australian rugby league footballer
