= Hayat Market =

Supermarket chain in Mogadishu, Somalia

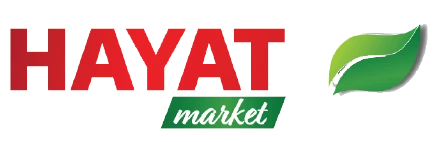

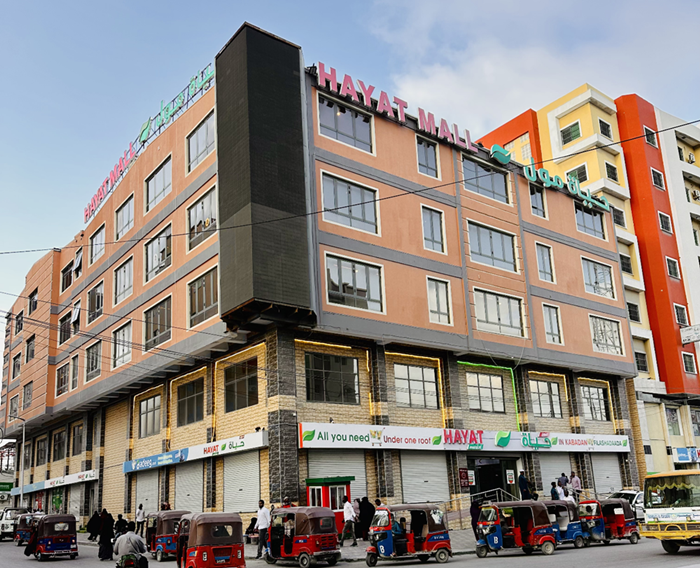
- Hayat Market in 2025
- Type: Private
- Industry: Retail
- Founded: April 2020
- Headquarters: Mogadishu, Somalia
- Area served: Banadir, Somalia
- Key people: Abdinor Gutale (CEO)
- Products: Groceries, electronics, clothing, household goods
- Parent: Safa International
- Website: hayatmarket.com

Hayat Market is a supermarket and retail chain headquartered in Mogadishu, Somalia. The company was established in April 2020 by Safa International, a United Arab Emirates–based business group. Hayat Market operates several branches in Mogadishu and provides retail services, including groceries, household goods, and consumer products.

== Background ==
Hayat Market's first branch was opened in Mogadishu in April 2020, a time when the Somali retail industry was witnessing rapid growth. The supermarket chain was founded by Safa International, a company that was established in 1989 and is based in the UAE.

Hayat Market has since expanded to establish several branches in Mogadishu, the capital city of Somalia. As of 2025, Hayat Market has opened several branches in different districts of Mogadishu, including Taleex (KM4), Zope (KM5), and other commercial areas.

== Public events and recognition ==
Hayat Market has hosted public events and business promotions in Mogadishu, including activities during the Independence Week celebrations in 2025.

Hayat Market has also received recognition at business award events. In 2024, the business chain was recognized as the Best Supermarket Chain of the Year at the East Africa Somali Awards (EASA). In 2025, the business chain was recognized as the Best Supermarket of the Year at the Somali Business Awards.

== See also ==
- Economy of Somalia
- Retail
- Mogadishu
