= Uncle Don's =

Malaysian restaurant chain

- Company type: Private
- Industry: Food & Beverage
- Founded: 2015
- Founder: Ian Ong Ming Hock; Don Daniel Theseira; Jahnel Tortogo Aguaron
- Headquarters: Taman Tun Dr Ismail, Kuala Lumpur, Malaysia
- Area served: Malaysia
- Key people: Ian Ong Ming Hock (CEO); Don Daniel Theseira (Director); Jahnel Tortogo Aguaron (Director)
- Products: Western & Local Fusion Cuisine
- Parent: Uncle Don’s Holdings Sdn Bhd
- Website: uncledons.com.my

Uncle Don's is a Malaysian restaurant chain and producer of foods & beverages based in Kuala Lumpur.

Uncle Don's is known for its Western, Italian, Malaccan-Portuguese and fusion cuisines. Its tagline is "Dine Like A Don Everyday".

== History ==
In 2015, Uncle Don's launched their first outlet in SS2, Petaling Jaya. Later, they launched their second outlet in Publika followed by Taman Tun Dr Ismail, Hartamas and Taipan.

In 2018, Uncle Don's launched a 18,000 square feet (1,700 m^{2}) central kitchen to maintain food quality across all outlets.

Uncle Don's opened three more outlets in Kuala Lumpur, Ipoh and Seremban in 2020, becoming the chain's 19th, 20th and 21st branches respectively.

In 2020, Uncle Don's was awarded the Golden Bull Award (Malaysia).

According to the Malay Mail, Uncle Don's has "opened three more outlets in KL, Ipoh and Seremban to provide affordable alcoholic beverages and local cuisines to the large number of the Indian and Chinese population of that area".

As of 2021, they expanded to 44 outlets in a span of 7 years.

In early 2023, there were 42 Uncle Don's Restaurants in Peninsular Malaysia.

== Services ==
Uncle Don's is operated by Uncle Don's Holdings Sdn Bhd through two wholly owned subsidiaries. Uncle Don's Restaurants Sdn Bhd (UDRSB), operates and manages all the restaurants and Uncle Don’s Manufacturing Sdn Bhd (UDMSB), manufactures and distributes all food and beverage products used by their restaurants.
