= Patrícia Kimberly =

Brazilian pornographic actor

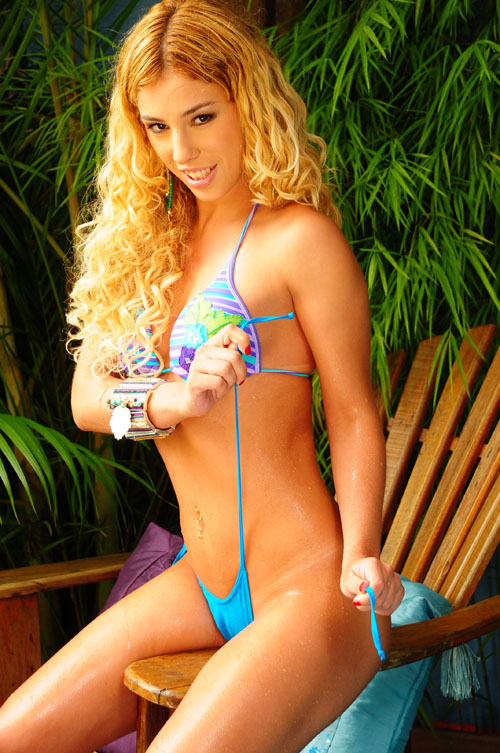
- Patrícia Kimberly in 2010
- Born: January 6, 1984 (age 42); São Paulo, Brazil
- Other names: Patricia Kimberlly, Patty Kimberly, Patricia Limbrely, Patricia Kinberly, Patricia Limberly, Patrícia Kimberlin, Kimba Isaan, Patrícia Kimberly, Patricia Kimberli, Patricia Kimberly, Paty Kimberly

Patrícia Kimberly (born 6 January 1984) is a Brazilian sex worker.

== Career ==
Kimberly began her career as a prostitute in the nightclubs of São Paulo at age 18. In 2005, she began working in adult films. She is frequently invited to talk shows and interviews to speak in favor of prostitution and the adult film industry.

In 2018, Kimberly was a winner of the Carnival of São Paulo as a muse of the Acadêmicos do Tatuapé Samba school.

Marie Claire noted her as a "sex influencer" due to her large number of followers on social networks.

== Awards ==
Year	Result	Award	Film
2015	Won	Sexy Hot Award – Best Fetish Scene	Pés do prazer
2016	Won	Sexy Hot Award - Best Double Penetration Sex Scene	As fantasias de Paty
2016	Won	Sexy Hot Award - Best Fetish Scene	Cornolândia 3
2016	Won	Sexy Hot Award - Best Orgy/Gang Bang Scene	Orgia na piscina
2016	Won	Sexy Hot Award - Best Ménage Scene	As fantasias de Paty
2016	Nominated	Sexy Hot Award - Best Title	As fantasias de Paty
2017	Won	Sexy Hot Award - Best Actress	Uberxxx da Paty
2017	Won	Sexy Hot Award - Best Orgy/Gang Bang Scene	Orgasmos Múltiplos
2017	Nominated	Sexy Hot Award - Best Lesbian scene	Garotas da Van Rolê Vip
