= Sri Guan Teik =

- Company type: Private Limited Company
- Genre: Financial services, Pawnbrokers
- Founded: 1986
- Founder: Tan & Partners
- Headquarters: Jitra, Kedah, Malaysia
- Number of locations: Alor Setar, Gurun, Sungai Petani, Pulau Langkawi, Kuala Nerang, Kulim, Changlun, Kangar, Arau, Pokok Sena, Semenyih, Batang Kali
- Services: Unsecured loans, secured loans, cheque exchange service, buy used golds
- Number of employees: 100
- Website: www.guanteik.com.my

Sri Guan Teik Credit Sdn Bhd (源德信贷有限公司), formerly known as Sri Guan Teik Enterprise Sdn Bhd, is a licensed moneylender in Malaysia. The company operates as a licensed moneylender. The company exclusively serves and offers unsecured loan to the civil service members, government worker, pensioners, and SOCSO receivers. Additionally, secured loans are offered to the public, accessible by pledging gold or jewellery as collateral. In 2010, the company was awarded the Golden Bull Award. Monthly Interest for Secured loan (Gold Pledging) is as low as 1%, whereas for unsecured loan is 1.5% monthly interest.

== Office locations ==
Sri Guan Teik Credit Sdn Bhd has its headquarters in Jitra, Kedah, Malaysia, and branches at various locations, including Alor Setar, Gurun, Sungai Petani, Pulau Langkawi, Kuala Nerang, Kulim, Kangar, Arau, Pokok Sena.

== Gold traders ==
With the recognition of Golden Bull Award, Sri Guan Teik is also one of the well known gold traders in Malaysia. Cash is given immediately over the counter once Sale and Purchase is signed.
