= Lone Star Steel Company =

Tubular steel mill in Lone Star, Texas

Lone Star Technologies, Inc.
- Industry: Metals
- Founded: 1942; 84 years ago
- Defunct: June 14, 2007; 19 years ago
- Fate: Acquired by U.S. Steel
- Headquarters: Lone Star, Texas
- Key people: Rhys J. Best, Chairman & CEO; Charles J. Keszler, Chief Financial Officer
- Products: Steel
- Number of employees: 2,784 (2007)

Lone Star Steel Company was a company that operated a plant that produced steel in Lone Star, Texas. It specialized in making tubular steel with outer diameters ranging from 16 inches to 1.415 inches. In 2007, it was acquired by U.S. Steel for $2.1 billion.

The company presented its annual Chief Roughneck Award to lifetime contributors to the petroleum industry since 1955; the award has been presented by U.S. Steel since 2007 after it acquired the company.

== History ==
The company was founded in 1942.

In 1981, the company introduced a new family of steel, oil and gas well casings.

In 1985, the company was spun off from Northwest Industries (now Fruit of the Loom, Inc. successor to Farley Industries, Inc.). William H. Beasley 3d was named chairman and chief executive officer of Lone Star.

In August 1988, the company acquired American Federal Bank for $48 million. It sold the bank for $150 million in 1993.

In 1989, the company filed bankruptcy; it emerged in 1991.

In 2001, the company reached a 4-year collective bargaining agreement with its labor union.

In 2002, U.S. Steel canceled its marketing agreement with the company.

In 2007, the company was acquired by U.S. Steel.

In March 2016, U.S. Steel idled the plant.

In December 2016, U.S. Steel permanently closed a section of the plant.
