= Antony Burgmans =

Dutch businessman (born 1947)

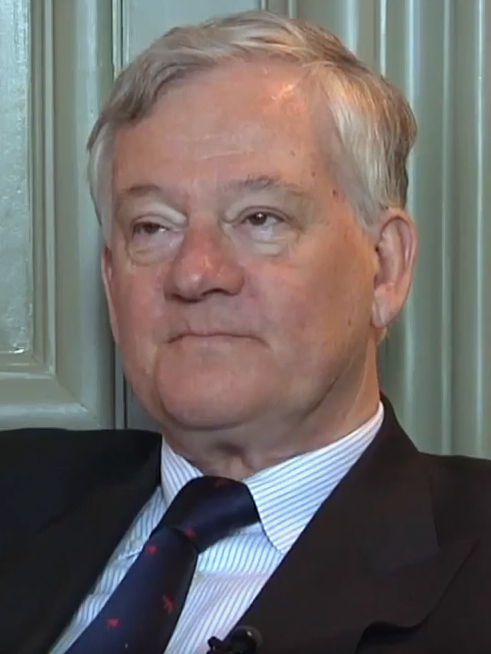
- Born: 13 February 1947; Rotterdam
- Alma mater: Nyenrode Business University; Stockholm University; Lancaster University
- Employer: AkzoNobel (2006–); Unilever (1972–2007)

Antony Burgmans (born 13 February 1947) is a Dutch businessman. Formerly non-executive chairman of Unilever, he is currently chairman of paint company AkzoNobel.

== Early life and education ==
Born 13 February 1947, Rotterdam, Burgmans studied business administration at Nyenrode in the Netherlands, and political and social sciences at Stockholm University in Sweden. He then completed a Master of Arts in Marketing at Lancaster University in England. In December 2003 he received an Honorary Doctorate of Laws from Lancaster University.

== Career ==
Burgmans joined Unilever in 1972, working as marketing assistant at Lever, Netherlands on the dishwater detergent Sun. Later, he held marketing and sales positions in the company's detergents businesses in Indonesia and the Netherlands. In 1982, he was appointed marketing and sales director of Lever in the Netherlands and in 1985, became marketing director of Lever Germany. Three years later, he was appointed chairman of PT Unilever Indonesia. In 1991, he became director of Unilever with responsibility for personal care products. Burgmans took over responsibility for Ice Cream and Frozen Foods - Europe in May 1994 and, later that year, was appointed chairman of the Europe Committee, which co-ordinates Unilever's European activities.

In October 1998, he was appointed vice chairman of Unilever N.V. and became chairman of Unilever N.V in May 1999. In May 2005, Burgmans was elected chairman Unilever N.V. and PLC. In January 2007, it was announced that he would be replaced by Michael Treschow upon standing down as chairman in May 2007.

In May 2017, an Amsterdam court rejected attempts by investors to remove Burgmans from the chairmanship of Akzo Nobel. Burgmans was seen as an obstacle to a takeover bid for the company from PPG.

== Other positions ==
Burgmans also serves as member of the supervisory board of ABN AMRO, a member of the International Advisory Board of Allianz and a non-executive director of BP. He is also co-chairman of the Global Commerce Initiative (GCI) and chairman of the Supervisory Boards of, WWF-Netherlands, the Mauritshuis Museum in The Hague and the Dutch National Opera in Amsterdam.
