= Ken Nwogbo =

Nigerian journalist

- Born: 18 March 1971 (age 55); Awka, Anambra State
- Citizenship: Nigeria
- Education: Lagos State University
- Occupations: Columnist and publisher
- Years active: 1989 - present
- Notable work: Beacon of ICT Awards

Ken Nwogbo (born 18 March 1971) is a Nigerian business journalist, ICT journalist, contributing writer at The Guardian and founder of Communication Week Media Limited, the publisher of Nigeria CommunicationsWeek, a Nigeria information and communications technology newspaper.

Nwogbo is the organizer of the Beacon of ICT Awards.

== Early life and education ==
Ken was born on 18 March 1971 in Awka, the capital of Anambra State, eastern Nigeria. He attended Ezi-Awka Primary School in 1977 and later Igwebuike Grammar School where he obtained the West Africa School Certificate in 1989. He proceeded to the Federal Polytechnic, Oko where he received a Higher National Diploma in Mass Communications. He later obtained a postgraduate diploma in public administration from the University of Calabar and Master of Business Administration (MBA) from Lagos State University. He has participated in over 200 local and international seminars and media conferences.

== Career ==
Nwogbo started his career in journalism at Akwa Ibom State when he was undergoing the compulsory one year National Youth Service. He joined the services of Daily Champion as a capital market reporter in August 1997, shortly after he completed the youth service program. He left Daily Champion in 2005 as a deputy news editor. He joined Businessworld as associate editor in 2006, the same year he established Nigeria CommunicationsWeek. Since he began his career, he has written over 2,000 stories and articles in national dailies.

== Awards and honours ==
Nwogbo has received numerous awards including the Science and Development Network award for Science Communication Writing in Uganda. He also received the Securities and Exchange Commission award of excellence in financial journalism. He also bagged the Information Technology Association of Nigeria's award in recognition of his immense contributions to the development of ICT in Nigeria.
