= SME One Asia Awards =

- Date: Inaugural event was held on 28 October 2011
- Location: Marina Bay Sands
- Participants: 1100
- Awards: Distinguished, Prominent, Notable, Emerging, Foreign Enterprise, Overseas Enterprise, Avant-Garde, Hoffen
- Website: http://www.sme1.asia/

SME One Asia Awards is an event that is organised by The APF Group in Singapore. Currently in its fourth year, it has a total of 350 nominations and 191 winners, and has at least 1000 attendees for the awards dinner which is held at Marina Bay Sands every year.

== History ==
The SME One Asia Awards was established in 2011 by the APF Group Pte Ltd to recognise the businesses and their leaders’ achievements of the Small and Medium Enterprises in Singapore, particularly the companies that have implemented the business practices that contribute to the development of people, society and the environment. Through these developments, the awards promote sustainable growth in Singapore as well as overseas.

== Background ==
The SME One Asia Awards targets SMEs with more than S$1 million and less than S$100 million in yearly revenue. Currently, SMEs are an important part in Asia, as they help generate economic growth in Asia. Furthermore, the awards are built on a branding and publicity programme dedicated to raising the profiles and awareness of its winners.

The SME One Asia Awards is also a platform in which socially responsible business leaders are given the opportunity to connect with each other, share business ideas and practices as well as growing to become an active community of socially responsible leaders. In 2012, the SME One Asia Awards ranked and judged 120 submissions, which included nominations from China, Cambodia, Philippines, Malaysia and Indonesia, of which 66 companies were selected as winners across the six award categories.

In 2013, the SME One Asia Awards spanned eleven industries with 27.3% of the companies coming from the service industry, 4.6% of the companies coming from the information technology sector, 1.5% of the companies came from the entertainment and tourism sectors, another 1.5% of the companies came from agriculture industry, 16.7% came from the construction industry, 18.2% of the companies came from distribution and wholesale sector, 4.6% came from the electronics and engineering sector, 6.1% of the companies came from the manufacturing industry, a further 6.1% of the companies were in the F&B sector, 3% of the companies came from the logistics and transport industry and last but not least, 10.6% of the companies came from the real estate sector.

== Awards ==
This award comprises six categories, defined by the number of years the participating company has been in operation. The Distinguished Awards, for companies that have been in operation for more than 15 years. The Prominent Awards are for companies who have been in operation for more than 9 years. The Notable Awards are for companies who have been in operation for more than 5 years. The Emerging Awards are for companies who have been in operation for more than 1 year but less than 4 years. Last but not least, the Foreign Enterprise Award is given to foreign companies with a local presence and the Overseas Enterprise Award which is given to overseas businesses.

In 2012, there was the introduction of the special awards category. The awards were designed to acknowledge companies with significant contributions. The Avant -Garde award is awarded to companies with creative business innovation. There is also the Hoffen award which is awarded to companies which inspire community development.

=== Avant-Garde Award ===
The Avant-Garde Award recognises companies that display business innovation and creativity, as well as companies who have effectively introduced inspiring, new and revolutionary ideas to their business models, products and/or services. Furthermore, the implementation of the ideas has to be well defined and must contribute to the company's overall business performance. In addition to that, the idea has to be original and surprising and must be able to capture imagination of people as well as the industry. One Winner of this Award was BreadTalk Group, who won it in 2012

=== Hoffen Award ===
The Hoffen Award recognises the faith and commitment of companies that bring new life and revival to living spaces, as well as honouring the companies which contribute to the betterment of the environment and people's lives. This award is meant to inspire people and social groups to make a difference, and for businesses to go beyond profit making. One winner of this Award was The Fullerton Heritage who won it in 2012.

== Judging Process ==
The participating companies undergo both quantitative and qualitative assessment from a panel of judges. The judging criterion comprises the Companies’ Sales Turnover, their Brand Value, their Profit Margin / Profit per Staff, Entrepreneur Spirit / Business Model, and whether there is Responsible Leadership.

== Judges ==
The SMEs that have been nominated for this award will have to undergo a selection process with advice and assessment from a panel of Judges/Advisors. In addition to that, the appointed panel of judges will provide insights and opinions that would add a critical dimension that will help to develop SMEs across the region. Furthermore, impartiality and confidentiality of the judging and auditing processes is ensured as an independent panel of judges/advisors from various associations, institutions and industry leaders are selected.

Name	Position	Company
Mr Teng Theng Dar	Director	Business Compass Consultancy
Ms Susan Teh	CEO	ST Paramount Pte Ltd
Mr Lee Tiong Heng	Tax Partner	Deloitte & Touché LLP
Ms Amy Lee	Director	UOB-Kay Hian
Mr Tony Yeo	Director	Drew & Napier LLC
Mr Colin Goh	CEO	The Old Parliament House Ltd
Ms Fiona MacKinnon	Director	Direct Marketing Association of Singapore
Mr Henn Tan	Chairman	Trek 2000 International Ltd
Mr Sam Chia	CEO	SC Coaching Asia Pte Ltd
Ms Penny Low	Co-chairman	Social Enterprise Association of Singapore
Dr Martin Blake	CEO	Be Sustainable Pte Ltd
Mr Sean Lee	CEO	Marco Polo Marine Ltd
Mr Seah Moon Ming	Co-chairman	Temasek Polytechnic

== Winners ==
=== 2011 ===
Year	Award	Number of Winners	Award of the Year
2011	Distinguished award	14	Low Lee Yong of MHC Medical Network Pte Ltd
2011	Notable Award	12	Eldwin Chua of Paradise Group Holdings
2011	Prominent Award	14	Thomas Bon of OKH Holdings Pte Ltd
2011	Emerging Award	13	Oh Cheng San of Pin Si Kitchen
2011	Foreign enterprise Award	7	Deepakjit Singh Chatrath of Encompass Digital Media (Asia) Pte Ltd
2011	Total Number of Awards	60	

=== 2012 ===
Year	Awards	Number of Winners	Award of the Year
2012	Distinguished award	18	Lincoln Cheng of Zouk Club
2012	Notable Award	10	Victor Lim of Rotating Offshore Solutions
2012	Prominent Award	15	Nicholas Goh of Verztec consulting Pte Ltd Vincent Teo of CT-Tech Pte Ltd
2012	Emerging Award	10	Marcus Ong of Powerpac International Pte Ltd
2012	Foreign Enterprise Award	4	Hans Henrik Friis of Dorier Asia
2012	Overseas Enterprise Award	5	Nil
2012	Special Award	2	George Quek of BreadTalk Group Ltd and Giovanni Viterale of The Fullerton Heritage
2012	Honouree Award	2	Nil
2012	Total Number of Awards	66	

=== 2013 ===
Year	Awards	Number of Winners	Award of the Year
2013	Distinguished award	18	Teow Boon Ling of Cargo Community Network
2013	Notable Award	11	Lim Yew Soon of EL Development Pte Ltd
2013	Prominent Award	8	Jimmy Fong Teck Loon of Epicentre Pte Ltd
2013	Emerging Award	17	Alvin Lee of Amxon Constructors Pte Ltd
2013	Foreign enterprise Award	3	Nil
2013	Overseas Enterprise Award	8	Nil
2013	Total Number of Awards	65	

== Awards Dinner ==
The inaugural event was held at Marina Bay Sands Grand Ballroom on 28 October 2011. It attracted 110 nominations, of which 60 companies were winners. There were 1100 guests who attended the gala awards ceremony presided over by the Guest of Honour, Mr Seah Kian Peng who presented the award trophies. Several ambassadors from various countries in Asia were present to witness the ceremony.

In 2012, the second Awards Dinner was held at Marina Bay Sands, with 65 winners from 9 categories with a total of 1130 guests attending the event. The guests include the winners and their guests, as well as business owners and foreign delegates. Furthermore, the guest of honour for that year was Mr Seah Kian Peng.

In 2013, the third Awards Dinner was held at Marina Bay Sands, with a total of 1180 guests attending the event, the guests include the Winners and their guests, business owners, distinguished guests, ambassadors, foreign delegates, members from trade associations, government institutions, sponsors as well as partners, media partners and journalists from the various newspapers.

Below is the summary of the number of awards given out for each year, including significant winners

Year	Number of Awards
2011	60
2012	66
2013	65
2014	41

== Media coverage ==
For the SME One Asia Awards Dinner, Channel News Asia was the official media partner for the SME One Asia Awards. Other supporting media partners include The Business Times, The Straits Times and Lianhe Zaobao. Also included are the various write ups that were featured in other publications.

== Regional expansion ==
The SME One Asia Awards 2013 includes participants from Malaysia, Philippines, Indonesia, Cambodia, South Korea and China. Supporting regional partners and their media providers are also invited for the event.

== Supporting partners ==
Supporting Organisation: Singapore Indian Chamber of Commerce and Industry (SICCI)

Official Knowledge Management Partner: Singapore Institute of Management

Official Design Partner: A.S. Louken Group Pte Ltd

Official Trophy Co-Sponsor: Royal Selangor International

Official Media Partner: CNBC
