= Robert Polet =

- Born: July 25, 1955 (age 70); Kuala Lumpur, Malaysia
- Education: Nyenrode Business Universiteit, MBA 1976 University of Oregon
- Occupation: CEO of Gucci Group
- Children: Anne-Christine and Francine

Robert Polet (born July 25, 1955) is the former CEO of Gucci Group and prior to that worked as the president of the ice cream and frozen foods division of Unilever. He won the 2007 Fortune European Businessman of the Year award by Fortune Magazine.

== Biography ==
Polet was born in Kuala Lumpur, Malaysia in 1956, went to school in Britain and the Netherlands and was sent by Unilever to Paris, Milan, Hamburg, and Malaysia.

He studied business at Nyenrode Business Universiteit in Breukelen and later earned his MBA at the University of Oregon in 1976.

After receiving his MBA, he joined Unilever in 1978, where he worked until 2004 in various positions. He worked in global management, marketing, and was the president of the Malaysia division and later the president of the ice cream and frozen foods division. He joined Gucci in July 2004.

Polet is married and has two daughters, Anne-Christine and Francine.

== Gucci ==
Polet spent most of his career at Unilever as the president of the ice cream and frozen foods division of the company prior to accepting the CEO position at Gucci. Due to the stark differences between the industries, when Polet took the reins of Gucci in July 2004, he was received with much skepticism and doubt in the fashion industry and was the target of several jokes in the media. Many executives in retail in New York City were confused with the choice and have stated that success in the fashion industry is forged by relationships, something that Polet was severely lacking, being an unknown in the industry. Analysts' positions were varied. Some said that bringing someone with no fashion experience was a big mistake while others pointed out that several other companies like The Limited and Abercrombie & Fitch have sought managers from outside the industry with highly successful results.

He was selected by a team at PPR led by its CEO Serge Weinberg to succeed Gucci's former CEO Domenico De Sole after PPR decided not to renew his contract. While the Gucci line has been successful, the nine subsidiary labels the company owns have been doing poorly and have been losing money. Gucci's net income in the fourth quarter of 2003, half a year prior to Polet's hiring, has been solely from its primary line and its growth was less than predicted.

In October following his hiring, he detailed his plans for Gucci in front of hundreds of the top PPR executives in Lisbon. He talked about reorganizing the structure of the company, doubling its size, and increasing profit margins. Per his family-oriented character, when the floor was opened to questions, Polet apologized and left for the airport to catch his daughter's birthday. At this time, skepticism still clouded his hiring and many executives were left disappointed.

He employed his hands-off management philosophies at Gucci and let the designers do their job without executive interference. He also employed some strategies more specific to the situation. Prior to his hiring, Gucci let Tom Ford, the principal designer that turned the Gucci line around, go along with the previous CEO. However, Polet stressed that the Gucci brands should be the primary focus instead of the designer since the brand can far outlive the designer. He also moved to assign a business manager and creative manager to each line under Gucci, which allowed more freedom per product line.

Three years later, Gucci's sales and profits grew even faster than Polet's ambitious plans outlined at the convention in Lisbon. All of its lines which were previously losing money became profitable except for Yves Saint Laurent though its losses have been cut by two thirds. The operating profit margin went from 10% to 16% within the three years. PPR's stock which fell on the news of Polet's hiring, rose 50% since until 2008.

However, some critics said that the numbers were residual successes of Polet's predecessors and that Gucci's fashion had declined, which will lead to future losses. Mark Lee, the head of Gucci's flagship line disagreed, and asserted that sales were still surging ahead with new designs.
