= Beatrice Ayuru Byaruhanga =

Ugandan entrepreneur and school founder

- Born: c. 1971; Lira, Uganda
- Education: Makerere University
- Known for: starting a school in Lira, entrepreneurship
- Children: six
- Awards: 1. UNCTAD Women in Business Award in 2010

Beatrice Ayuru Byaruhanga (born 1970s) is an Ugandan entrepreneur and school founder. She won the UNCTAD Women in Business Award in 2010 after opening the Lira Integrated school ten years before.

== Life ==
Byaruhanga was one of sixteen children born to her father in his polygamous marriage. She was raised in Lira and her father was teased that he was wasting money sending his daughters to school when he could have been taking dowries. His daughter Byaruhanga dreamed of having her own school. Her father gave her land to start a school when she was 19 and expecting her second child. She was the first girl to leave her high school and go to university. She graduated from Makerere University and began teaching.

Realising that she needed money to build a school she started three business ventures. One of these was to plant cassava on the land her father had given her. This business allowed her to open her new school in 2000 in Lira. The school is known as the Lira Integrated School and it is co-educational. For the first seven years the area was in unrest due to the Lord's Resistance Army but they withdrew in 2007.

She was to have six children. She joined the EMPERTEC programme that gave her support as an aspiring entrepreneur. In 2014 her school had 1,500 pupils of which 100 were being subsidised because of their promise, but inability to find the school fees of $90.

In 2010 she won the second Women in Business Award. In 2014 she gave a TEDx talk in Geneva on “From Cassavas to Classrooms”.
