= Horecava 2010 =

52nd edition of the Horecava

- Genre: Hospitality trade fair
- Begins: January 11, 2010
- Ends: January 14, 2010
- Location: RAI Amsterdam
- Years active: 1957–present
- Participants: 618 exhibitors
- Attendance: 50,493

Awards
- Golden Chefs hat: Wim Klerks
- Master-student: Hein Vissers and Paul van Creij
- Young chef: Arturo Dalhuisen
- Innovation award: the leaftender

The Horecava 2010 is the 52nd edition of the Horecava. It was opened by a ceremony by Gerda Verburg on January 11 and ran until January 14, 2010. Its theme was sustainability. An important moment was the launch of the campaign Sustainable Fish that aims at improving the position of sustainable fish in restaurants. The goal of the campaign is that by the end of 2010 at least 250 restaurants will hold a Marine Stewardship Council certification.

The 2010 Innovation Award was won by the leaftender, a machine for brewing fresh tea from whole tea leaves.
