= Nyenrode Business University =

Private business university in Netherlands

Nyenrode Business Universiteit
- Nyenrode Business Universiteit
- Motto in English: A reward for life
- Type: Private business school
- Established: 1946
- Rector: Michael Erkens
- Location: Breukelen, Amsterdam & The Hague; 52.161°N 5.006°E
- Colours: Yellow and red
- Website: www.nyenrode.nl

Nyenrode Business Universiteit (abbreviated as NBU; Dutch: Nyenrode Business Universiteit) is a Dutch business university and the only private higher education institution that has the university status in the Netherlands. Founded in 1946, it is located on a large estate in the town of Breukelen, between Amsterdam and Utrecht. The educational institution is named after the castle where the course is located: Nijenrode Castle. Nyenrode was founded under the name of the Netherlands Training Institute for Abroad (NOIB in Dutch) by renowned private Dutch companies, including KLM, Shell, Unilever, Philips, and AkzoNobel, with the objective 'For Business, By Business'. The establishment was the result of an idea from KLM director Albert Plesman.

== Academics ==
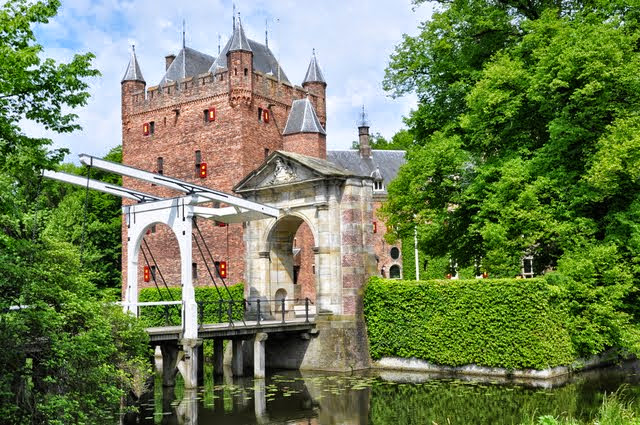
Entrance to Nijenrode Castle, where the university campus is located.

The full-time and part-time MBA programs include a two-week module at Northwestern University's Kellogg School of Management near Chicago. In addition to Kellogg, Nyenrode has close connections with the University of Stellenbosch in South Africa, the Vlerick Leuven Gent Management School in Belgium, the University of St. Gallen in Switzerland & S. P. Jain Institute of Management and Research in Mumbai. Nyenrode was a cofounder of the China-Europe International Business School. Nyenrode's international MBA program attracts students from all around the world. Nyenrode has a selection process that involves taking a Graduate Management Admissions Test, Business Game: A Case Study, and a selection interview. Due to the proportion of international students in each promotion, most courses are given in English.

== Rankings ==
In the Financial Times Ranking for European Business Schools (2020), Nyenrode was given an overall position of 41st. In the Financial Times Ranking for executive education programs (2020), Nyenrode achieved 27th place for open programmes and 76th for custom programmes (2014). The Masters in Management MSc was given an overall position of 64th on the Financial Times Global Ranking for Masters in Management (2013).

Bachelor of Science in Business Administration Rankings: The BSc in Business Administration was ranked by Keuzegids as the best program in the International Business category in the Netherlands from 2017 until 2020.

== Accreditation ==
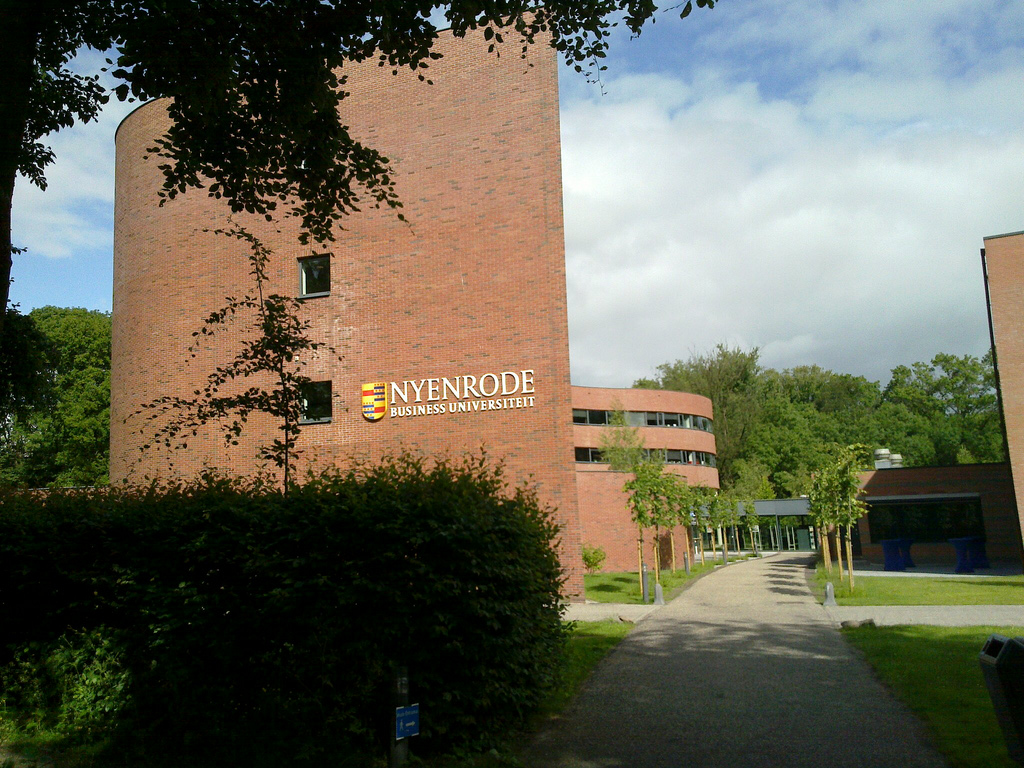
Dr. Albert Heijn building

Nyenrode Business University is fully accredited by

- Association of MBAs
- EQUIS / EFMD
- EFMD
- Nederlands-Vlaamse Accreditatieorganisatie
- Ministry of Education, Culture and Science (NVAO accreditation)
- Accountancy Training Attainment Committee (CEA)

== Alumni ==
- Wim Kok, former Prime Minister of The Netherlands
- Antony Burgmans, former chairman of Unilever
- Peter Burggraaff, Director at Boston Consulting Group
- Robert Polet, former chairman of Gucci
- Hein Verbruggen, International Olympic Committee member
- Jeroen Hoencamp, Chief Operating Officer VodafoneZiggo
- Jan Kees de Jager, former Minister of Finance of the Netherlands
- Dinesh Gunawardena, Former Prime Minister of Sri Lanka
- Albert Heijn, executive in Albert Heijn supermarket chain
- Tom van den Nieuwenhuijzen, member of the House of Representatives
- Willem Oltmans, journalist
- Oleksiy Pavlenko, Ukrainian Minister of Agrarian Policy and Food
- Janwillem van de Wetering, author
- Princess Viktória de Bourbon de Parme, businesswoman, lawyer, and member of the Dutch royal family

== See also ==
- List of business schools in Europe
