= Golden Bull Award (Malaysia) =

Malaysian business award

The Golden Bull Award is a business award for SMEs in Malaysia. Started in 2003, it is given to promote dynamism and entrepreneurial talent in the country.

== History ==
The award was established in 2003.

== Award Categories ==
=== Outstanding SMEs ===
SMEs with annual sales turnover of RM10 million and above up to RM75 million in the last three financial years. For service and service related sectors, the maximum annual sales turnover is RM10 million in the last three financial years. No. of winners: 100

=== Emerging SMEs ===
SMEs with annual sales turnover below RM5 million in the last three financial years. No. of winners: 20

=== Golden Bull International Cooperation Honorary Award ===
This award recognizes an international corporation for its collaboration with Malaysian SMEs in their growth and achievements, in particular the Golden Bull Award winners.

== Past winners ==
- 2010 Emerging SME - Sri Guan Teik Enterprise Sdn Bhd
