= XPDL =

Workflow software format

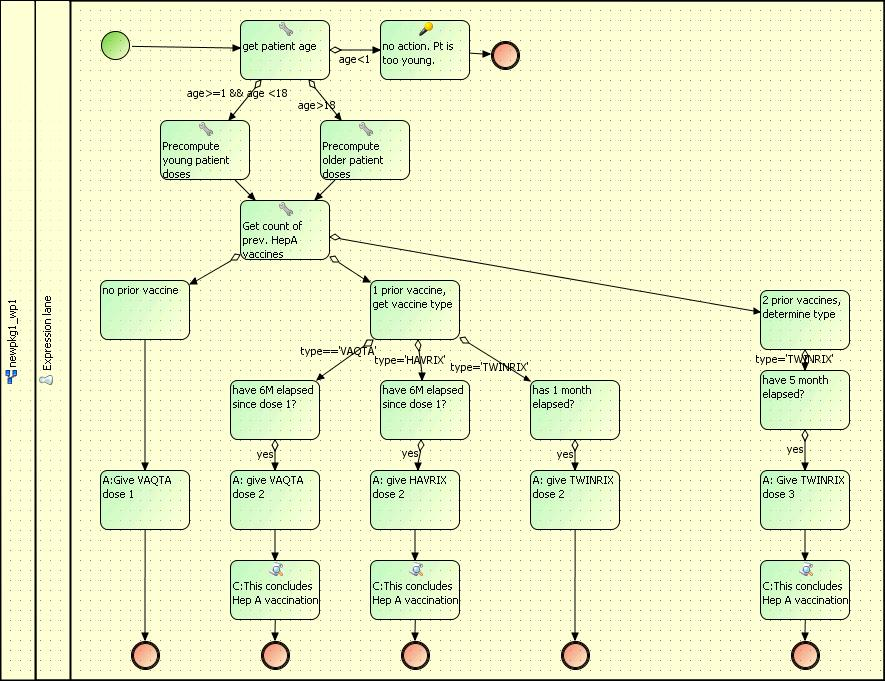
Process represented in XPDL (healthcare domain example, Hepatitis A immunization)

The XML Process Definition Language (XPDL) is a format standardized by the Workflow Management Coalition (WfMC) to interchange business process definitions between different workflow products, i.e. between different modeling tools and management suites. XPDL defines an XML schema for specifying the declarative part of workflow / business process.

XPDL is designed to exchange the process definition, both the graphics and the semantics of a workflow business process. XPDL is currently the best file format for exchange of BPMN diagrams; it has been designed specifically to store all aspects of a BPMN diagram. XPDL contains elements to hold graphical information, such as the X and Y position of the nodes, as well as executable aspects which would be used to run a process. This distinguishes XPDL from BPEL which focuses exclusively on the executable aspects of the process. BPEL does not contain elements to represent the graphical aspects of a process diagram.

It is possible to say that XPDL is the XML Serialization of BPMN.

== History ==
The Workflow Management Coalition, founded in August 1993, began by defining the Workflow Reference Model (ultimately published in 1995) that outlined the five key interfaces that a workflow management system must have. Interface 1 was for defining the business process, which includes two aspects: a process definition expression language and a programmatic interface to transfer the process definition to/from the workflow management system.

The first revision of a process definition expression language was called Workflow Process Definition Language (WPDL) which was published in 1998. This process meta-model contained all the key concepts required to support workflow automation expressed using URL Encoding. Interoperability demonstrations were held to confirm the usefulness of this language as a way to communicate process models.

By 1998, the first standards based on XML began to appear. The Workflow Management Coalition Working Group 1 produced an updated process definition expression language called XML Process Definition Language (XPDL) now known as XPDL 1.0. This second revision was an XML based interchange language that contained many of the same concepts as WPDL, with some improvements. XPDL 1.0 was ratified by the WfMC in 2002, and was subsequently implemented by more than two dozen workflow/BPM products to exchange process definitions. There was a large number of research projects and academic studies on workflow capabilities around XPDL, which was essentially the only standard language at the time for interchange of process design.

The WfMC continued to update and improve the process definition interchange language. In 2004 the WfMC endorsed BPMN, a graphical formalism to standardize the way that process definitions were visualized. XPDL was extended specifically with the goal of representing in XML all the concepts present in a BPMN diagram. This third revision of a process definition expression language is known as XPDL 2.0 and was ratified by the WfMC in October 2005.

In April 2008, the WfMC ratified XPDL 2.1 as the fourth revision of this specification. XPDL 2.1 includes extension to handle new BPMN 1.1 constructs, as well as clarification of conformance criteria for implementations.

In spring 2012, the WfMC completed XPDL 2.2 as the fifth revision of this specification. XPDL 2.2 builds on version 2.1 by introducing support for the process modeling extensions added to BPMN 2.0.

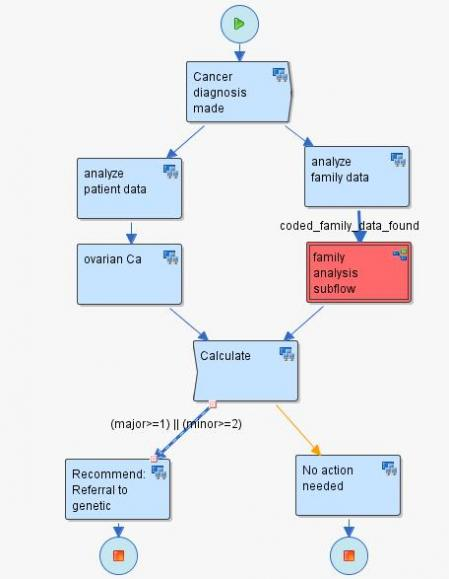
XPDL flowchart example (medical process)

== See also ==
- Business Process Management
- BPMN
- Workflow Management Coalition
