= Horecava =

Dutch annual hospitality trade fair

The Horecava is a Dutch annual hospitality trade fair held in Amsterdam since 1957 It is the largest hospitality fair in the Netherlands. It hosts the annual Dutch national championship hospitality since 2007.

== History ==
The initiative for a national hospitality exhibition was taken in 1953 by Gerrit Staalman, who pleaded for such an exhibition in hospitality magazine Misset Horeca, for which he was an advisor. In 1957 a first exhibition is held, organised by the Dutch Trade fair organisation. From 1959 the exposition is held in the Rai building. The fair has since then grown to the point where only those who are professionally active in hospitality are allowed as visitors in 1995. From this year on, large brewers, coffee producers, and large kitchen exposers decide to attend the fair only bi-annually, on even years, on what is known as a "wet" Horecava, odd years being called "dry". Since 2008 Horecava tries to slowly abolish the distinction.

== Exhibitions ==
The Horecava has several exhibition areas, each with exposants from different areas in hospitality and catering. The areas are interior design, outdoors, luxury food, coffee and corporate uniforms, fresh produce, drink and music, nightlife, innovation and trends, wine professional, fast service, interior decorating, automation, hotel, and large kitchen.

=== Innovation ===
The innovation pavilion focuses on innovative products for hospitality. Since 2001 it presents an annual innovation award. The award is presented in the categories Food & Beverage, Interior & Design, and Equipment.

=== Wine Professional ===
The Wine Professional is a wine exposition that has been held in conjunction with the Horecava since 2003. It is organised by The Wine and Food association, and is not part of the Horecava organisation.

== See also ==
- Horecava 2010
