= Maxine Fensom =

Australian adult industry businessman (born 1958)

Maxine Fensom (born 30 August 1958) is an Australian entrepreneur well known in the adult industry for founding a number of strip clubs, strippers' agencies, themed events and adult online stores. She also is the owner and founder of the Australian Adult Industry Awards, established in 2000 to recognise achievements in the Australian adult industry, as well as the national Miss Erotica and Miss Dream Girl pageants. Maxine acquired the licensing rights to Sexpo to hold the first ever exhibition in the United States launching in April 2023.

== Early life and education ==
Fensom was born on 30 August 1958 in Brisbane, Australia. Moving to Melbourne at the age of two, Fensom was educated at Camberwell High School and Brinsley Road Free School in Camberwell and had a modest upbringing, the only child of a single mother. She trained as a psychiatric nurse at Swinburne Technical College, but eventually her passion for dancing and acting led her to setting up a promotional dance troupe, which performed around Melbourne successfully for a number of years. Fensom also acted on television, appearing in various episodes as "Bouncy Miss" in the acclaimed Australian Broadcasting Corporation miniseries The Damnation of Harvey McHugh. She has also had a biography written about her life as the most recognisable female face in the adult industry.

== Career ==
Fensom currently operates a gentlemen's club in the suburb of Brunswick in Melbourne. Other businesses she operates include event agencies, a topless bar, an adult merchandise online store, a concierge service and adult party services.

Her career in the adult industry began as after her three-year stint on the daily horoscope segment of Channel Nine's In Melbourne Today show ended. Hosting bucks parties and private functions, Fensom's business grew exponentially, taking on corporate customers and establishing a business headquarters with the support of high-profile porn publisher Larry Flynt and Harry Mohney. Fensom has also been featured in Australian Playboy as a playmate of the month, in their "Girls from Melbourne" edition.

Fensom is a supporter of greater recognition and equality for women in the adult industry, greater regulation concerning employment in the adult industry and increased sentences for perpetrators of violent crime against women.

She ran as an independent candidate in the Victorian state elections in 2002 and 2010.

Fensom has experienced online harassment.

Fensom resides in Las Vegas and owns Las Vegas Cannabis Weddings, where performs marriages in her capacity as an ordained minister.
