= Marvin L. Manheim Award =

Award for contribution to workflow systems

The Marvin L. Manheim Award For Significant Contributions in the Field of Workflow is an industry recognition created by the Workflow Management Coalition in honor of the late Marvin L. Manheim. Manheim was a co-founder of the Workflow Management Coalition and was the William A. Patterson Distinguished Professor of Transportation at the Kellogg Graduate School of Management at Northwestern University from 1983 until his death in August 2000.

== History ==
The workflow award is given annually, since 2002, to recognize an individual or a specific group for their "influence, contribution, or distinguished use of workflow systems." The criteria for consideration is based on any significant contribution and not limited to members of the coalition. Both software developers and software end users have finalists and award recipients.

Manheim was a founder of Cambridge Systematics, which in 2001 established a separate awards program called the "Marvin L. Manheim Award" to honor his memory and promote innovation in the field of transportation. This is a separate program and not related to the workflow award.

== Recipients ==
- 2001: Haruo Hayami, Japan
- 2002: Jon Pyke, United Kingdom
- 2004: Keith Swenson, United States
- 2005: Robert Shapiro, United States
- 2006: David Hollingsworth, United Kingdom
- 2014: Connie W Moore, United States
- 2015: Jim Sinur, United States
- 2016: Sandy Kemsley, Canada
- 2017: Derek Miers, United Kingdom
- 2019: Nathaniel Palmer, United States
