= VP Awards =

Optical and eyewear industry award in India

VP Awards or VisionPlus Awards is a recognized award for the optical and eyewear industry.

The jury members for the 2014 awards in India were:

- Mr. B K Gupta, GKB Opticals, Kolkata
- Mr. Surendra Gangar, Gangar Eyenation, Mumbai
- Mr. Sudershan Binani, Himalaya Optical, Kolkata
- Mr. Hemanth Manay, S R Gopal Rao Optical, Bangalore
- Mr. Snehal Turakhia, Turakhia Opticians, Chennai

The VP Awards were announced on 9 March 2014, at the Westin Mumbai Garden City in Goregaon. Singer Nakash Aziz, of Indian Idol fame, performed at the program.

The winners of the VP Awards 2014 in India were:	
Best New Spectacle Frame (Luxury Segment)	Montblanc:MB0473
Best New Spectacle Frame (Male/Unisex - Premium Segment)	Silhouette:TMA ICON 5298
Best New Spectacles Frame (Female - Premium Segment)	FCUK:FCUK9951
Best New Spectacles Frame (Male/Unisex - Indian Brands)	Arcadio:SP232BK
Best New Spectacles Frame (Female - Indian Brands)	Emanuel Strazzi: Panache ESP3-914
Best New Sunglass Model (Male/Unisex - Premium Segment)	Montblanc:MB425S
Best New Sunglass Model (Female - Premium Segment)	Carrera:Carrera 5001
Best New Sunglass Model (Male/Unisex - Indian Brands)	IDEE: S1700Color C28
Best New Sunglass Model (Female - Indian Brands)	IDEE:S1701 Color C2
Best New Sports Eyewear	Nike: Road Machine NI 704S 070
Best New Children's Eyewear	Nickelodeon:N2637
Best New Fashion Eyewear Collection	Opium:Colorfornia Collection
Most Popular Lenses (Progressive)	ZEISS:ZEISS Progressive Individual 2
Most Popular Lens (Value)	Suprol : Electra
Most Popular Lens Coating	GKB Hi-Tech : Protec
Most Popular Oph.Contact Lens	Bausch&Lomb: Pure Vision2 HD Contact Lens
Most Popular Coloured Contact Lens	Freshlook:Colorblends
Most Popular CL Solution	Bausch&Lomb: Biotrue Multipurpose Solution
Best Value Enhancer (Retail)	Monarch:Optical Showroom Design & Execution
Best Value Enhancer (Lab)	Gerber Coburn: SL2 Express
Best Optometry or CSR Initiative	Lotus College Of Optometry: Mumbai Eye Care Campaign
Best Optometry Institute	Bausch&Lomb School Of Optometry
Best Marketing Initiative (Indian Brands)	IDEE: Campaign 2013-2014
Special Jury Award	Prodesign Denmark: 7103

After its launch in the India market the awards collaborated with the Dubai World Trade Centre's Vision-X exhibition to bring out the awards under the title Vision-X VP Awards in the Middle East.

The nominations Jury saw the coming together of some of the biggest names in the Middle Eastern eyewear retail. Mr Kian Saadat represented Hassan's, Mr Saeed Emam and Mr Khaled Mahmoud represented Magrabi Opticals, Mr Uday Shrikantiya and Mr Avinash Dudeja represented Rivoli EyeZone, Mr Mamdoh Rouhani represented Saudi Optic House and Mr Ali Yateem and Mr Mathews Jacob represented Yateem Opticians.

The awards were given away on the conclusion of the first day of the Vision-X exhibition in Dubai.

The winners of the Vision-X VP Awards were	
BEST NEW SPECTACLE FRAME (LUXURY SEGMENT)	TAG HEUER L-TYPE T
BEST NEW SPECTACLE FRAME (PREMIUM SEGMENT)	MONTBLANC MB 47902858
BEST NEW SPECTACLES FRAME (POPULAR SEGMENT)	MODO 4046
BEST NEW SUNGLASS MODEL (LUXURY SEGMENT)	CHOPARD SCH-A54D
BEST NEW SUNGLASS MODEL (PREMIUM SEGMENT)	CHOPARD SCH135
BEST NEW SUNGLASS MODEL (POPULAR)	MAUI JIM Sugar Beach, 421-02
BEST NEW SPORTS EYEWEAR	FERRARI 13265
BEST NEW CHILDREN'S EYEWEAR	HELLO KITTY HEAA061 C01
MOST POPULAR LENS (PROGRESSIVE)	Essilor Varilux S Series
MOST POPULAR LENS (BEST VALUE)	Essilor Transitions Signature VII
MOST POPULAR LENS COATING/VALUE ADD	Essilor Crizal Forte UV
MOST POPULAR OPHTHALMIC CONTACT LENS	ACUVUE® BRAND CONTACT LENSES 1-Day Acuvue Moist for Astigmatism
MOST POPULAR COLOURED CONTACT LENS	FRESHLOOK FreshLook ColorBlends
BEST VALUE ENHANCER (RETAIL)	NIDEK INC. LE-700
BEST VALUE ENHANCER (LAB)	Essilor Mr Blue
SPECIAL JURY AWARD	MAUI JIM Sugar Beach, 421-02

== Additional References ==
- Vision Plus Awards
- Vision Plus Awards
- "NIDEK's LE-700 won the "Vision-X Award" at Vision-X Dubai 2014 — News". NIDEK CO., LTD. 17 December 2014.
