= Golden Bull (broker award) =

Prize awarded to Dutch brokers

The Golden Bull is a Dutch prize in the world of brokers since 2007. The choice for the bull as a symbol is easy, since it also represents a rising exchange, which therefore is also called a bullmarket. Since the adding of a jury, the price has got more esteem with professional traders. The press also noticed and on special broker and trading websites there has been more and more attention towards the issue of the Golden Bull award.

== Categories ==
On annual basis, there are prizes in different categories. In 2015 these categories were: best broker, best trade innovation, best fund, best ETF, Green Bull (best sustainable fund), best mixfund-range, best asset en best trade-expert. The winners of the categories are chosen by a jury, except for the people choice award for best trade-expert.

== Organisation and jury ==
Since 2015, the Golden Bull award has been hosted by the biggest broker websites in The Netherlands: IEX.nl, Belegger.nl, DeBeurs.nl, EuroBench.com en BeursOnline. Before that the organization of the event was in hands of Belegger.nl. This website was in hands of the Dutch company Sanoma Media until 2015 and is now in hands of Value8 of former chairman of the Vereniging van Effectenbezitters, Peter Paul de Vries. In the first few years the winners of the award were determined by public vote. The last few years the public vote made place for a jury with specialists from the trading world.

== Winners ==
=== 2018 ===
Category	Winner
Best broker	Best Investments 4 U
Best trade-expert	Nico Pantelis
Best ETF	DB x-trackers MSCI Europe Small Cap Index UCITS ETF
Best fund	BlackRock European Special Situations Fund
Best mixfund-range	NN Dynamic Mix Funds
Best asset	Care IS vermogensbeheer
Best trade innovation	BUX
Green Bull	ASN Duurzaam Aandelenfonds

=== 2014 ===
Category	winner
Best broker	Saxo Bank
Educative investment institution	Morningstar
Fund	Skagen Global
Green Bull	ASN Milieu & Waterfonds
Index trade	SPDR S&P Global Dividend Aristocrats UCITS ETF
Asset	Theodoor Gilissen
Trade-expert	Bas Heijink
New trade concept	Knab Gemaksbeleggen

=== 2013 ===
Category	winner
Best broker	Lynx (online broker)
Educative investment institution	Trade Academy ABN AMRO
Fund	ASN Duurzaam Aandelenfonds
Green Bull	Triodos Sustainable Equity Fund
Index trade	ThinkETF's
Asset	Theodoor Gilissen Bankiers
Trade-expert	Nico Pantelis
Financial Commentator	Mathijs Bouman
Trade innovation	SystemShop
