= List of gay pornography awards =

The following are awards for gay pornography including ones that are no longer given. The list is organized by award and by year for each award.

== GayVN Awards ==
The GAYVN Awards are presented annually to honor work done in the gay pornography industry. The awards are sponsored by AVN Magazine, the parent publication of GAYVN Magazine, and continue the recognition for gay pornography which was part of the AVN Awards from 1986 to 1998.

The award recipients are listed below by the year of the award ceremony. In 1998, the first year of the awards, awards were given for that current year's work. Starting with the awards show held in 2000, the awards were given for the previous year's work. For example, the 8th GAYVN Awards were held Thursday, March 9, 2006; awards were given for the movies that were released in 2005. The awards have been held annually since 2000. The current record-holder for the most wins in one year is Lucas Entertainment's Michael Lucas' La Dolce Vita, which won 14 awards in 2007. The previous record-holder with 11 award wins in 2005 was Buckshot Productions' BuckleRoos.

== Grabby Awards ==
The Adult Erotic Gay Video Awards, better known as Grabby Awards, or The Grabbys, are presented annually for gay pornography since 1992, at live awards ceremonies in Chicago since 1999. They have been sponsored by Gay Chicago Magazine, later by Grab Magazine (since 2009).

== Hard Choice Awards ==
The Hard Choice Awards are presented annually by online gay and bisexual male-oriented website XX Factor which features news and reviews of XXX Web sites, gay adult films, print erotica and other forms of adult entertainment to "provide gay and bisexual men with information, news and entertainment that promotes a safe, healthy and enjoyable erotic lifestyle." The awards first started for films reviewed in 1994 and just eleven categories, as of 2009, the 15th year, they present in over thirty categories.

== The "Dave" Awards ==
Originated by Adam Gay Video Directory editor Dave Kinnick and backed by the in-house review staff, these awards were announced for the years 1989 to 1994. Kinnick had a monthly "Video Review" column in Advocate Men Magazine; the results were posted in his column each May from 1989 through 1993. The last awards were published for the first time in the Adam Gay Video 1996 Directory since the column ceased in December 1994.

== Gay Erotic Video Awards ==
The Gay Erotic Video Awards were awarded annually for gay and bisexual pornography by the Gay Video Guide (GVG), a pocket-sized newsstand magazine that catered primarily to fans. The Gay Video Guide (GVG) Awards, as they were originally known, were first given in the fall of 1992. Eligibility for the twenty-four awards that were presented in the inaugural year was determined by release date during a period ending in early October of a given year. Magazine staffers made the nominations and the voting was opened up to "special well-known celebrity judges". The award show was mounted as a charity event for the Aid for AIDS Organization.

The awards continued after the Guide itself ceased publication and were renamed the Gay Erotic Video Awards in 1998. Ironically, 1998 was the last year for which awards were given, at ceremonies held in 1999.

== Gay Producers Association ==
The Gay Producers Association (GPA) was a short-lived but significant group of gay video insiders that was formed during the "heyday of gay video". Their awards show, presented in Los Angeles in June, was considered to be an "E ticket" ride for the industry.

== Probe / Men in Video Awards ==
The Probe / Men in Video Awards, also called The Probies, were designed to be the People's Choice Awards of the gay pornography industry. Nominees were selected from names sent in from all over the world; winners were chosen by fans worldwide voting at a website or via mail, fax, or e-mail.

The list below is taken from the Adam Gay Video Directories for 1999 and 2004. Adam Gay Video 1999 Awards lists the awards by the year in which the work was done (the method emulated here); the Adam Gay Video 2004 Awards, by the year in which award ceremony was held. The lists here are incomplete; there were twenty categories in all, including "Best Pubic Hair".

=== 1995 === Video (tie) Jawbreaker The Plowboys Leather Video Leather Obsession 2 Orgy Lukas' Story 2	=== 1996 === Video (tie) Heatwave Lukas' Story 3	=== 1997 === Video Fallen Angel Leather Video Fallen Angel Ethnic Stud	=== 1998 === Newcomer Video French Connections 1, 2 (Falcon Studios) === 1999 === Kinkiest Video Fallen Angel 3 (Titan Media) Video Out of Athens 1, 2 (Falcon Studios) Hottest Hard Body Eric Evans

== X-Rated Critics Organization ==
The main article for the X-Rated Critics Organization (XRCO) is here.

The X-Rated Critics Organization (XRCO) gave awards for gay pornography for 6 years starting in 1984; the awards in gay categories were discontinued after 1989.

=== 1984 ===
Feature
Sailor in the Wild, Catalina Video
Director
Matt Sterling – Sizing Up
Actor
Michael Christopher

=== 1985 ===
Feature
Hot on the Trail, J.D. Cadinot
Director
William Higgins – The Young and the Hung
Actor
Ron Pearson
Newcomer
Cory Baker

=== 1986 ===
Feature
Bigger than Life, Huge Video
Director
Matt Sterling – Bigger than Life
Actor
Jeff Stryker
Newcomer
John Davenport

=== 1987 ===
Feature
Big Guns, Catalina Video
Director
Christopher Rage – My Masters
Actor
Mike Henson
Newcomer
Kevin Williams

=== 1988 ===
Feature
Too Big for His Britches, Tyger/Sierra Pacific
Director
Ronnie Shark – Too Big for His Britches, Tyger/Sierra Pacific
Actor
Steve Hammond
Newcomer
Tim Lowe

=== 1989 ===
Feature
Heat in the Night, Huge Video
Director
Kristen Bjorn – Carnival in Rio
Actor
Tim Lowe
Newcomer
Joey Stefano

== International Escort Awards ==
The International Escort Awards is an annual award ceremony for male escorts, sponsored by HX magazine, and Rentboy.com. The first awards ceremony was held in October 2006 at the Roxy NYC nightclub in New York City, with Shequida as emcee. While nominees were from 23 countries, half the winners were from New York. Twelve awards were handed out.

== Golden Dickie Awards ==
The Golden Dickie Awards were an award scheme run in 2008 and sponsored by RAD Video. The awards were structured to recognize amateur films and companies, as well as big-studios and ethnic films. Condomless productions were included.

=== 2008 Winners ===
- Best (Amateur) Twink Movie: Bareback Boiz Of Summer (Eurorad Video)
- Best (Amateur) Twink Studio: Cobra Video
- Best (Amateur) Twink Performer – top: Dennis Reed (Bareback Game Room – Eurorad Video)
- Best (Amateur) Twink Performer – bottom: Brent Corrigan (Fuck Me Raw – Cobra Video)
- Best (Amateur) Movie: What I Can't See 2 (Treasure Island Media)
- Best (Amateur) Studio: Treasure Island Media
- Best (Amateur) Studio Director: Paul Morris (What I Can't See 2 – Treasure Island Media)
- Best (Amateur) Performer – top: Jesse O'Toole (The Legendary Studs: Best Of Jesse O'Toole – Treasure Island Media)
- Best (Amateur) Performer – bottom: Sean Storm (Storm Surge: Storm Chronicles 3 – Cre8tive Juices)
- Best Major Studio: Lucas Entertainment
- Best Major Studio (Twinks): Eurocreme USA
- Best Major Studio Movie: Gigolo (Lucas Entertainment)
- Best Major Studio Director: John Bruno, Line-Up (Mustang Studios)
- Best Major Studio Performer – bottom: Francesco D'Macho (Private Lowlife – Hot House Video)
- Best Major Studio Twink Movie: Borstal Boy (Eurocreme USA)
- Best Major Studio Twink Performer – top: Ben Andrews (The Intern – Lucas Entertainment)
- Best Major Studio Twink Performer – Lost Innocence 3 (Bulldog Red)
- Best Ethnic Movie: Bareback Cum Party 6 (OTB Video)
- Best Ethnic Movie Studio: Flavaworks
- Best Ethnic Performer – top: Ramon Mendez (Best Of Ramon Mendez – Alexander Pictures)
- Best Ethnic Performer – bottom: Shorty J. (The Booty Bandit – B.C. Productions)
- Best Solo Film: Fratmen Up Close: Kelan (Fratmen)
- Best Solo Performance: Kelan (Fratmen Up Close: Kelan – Fratmen)
- Best Specialty/Fetish Studio: BulldogXXX
- Best Specialty/Fetish Film: Damon Blows America 8: Los Angeles (Treasure Island Media)
- Best DVD Collection/Compilation: Bareback Filthy Fuckers: Eurocreme Collection Series (Eurocreme)
- Best Pre-Condom Classic (Re-Release): Two By Ten (2×10) (Marksman Productions)
- Best Bisexual/Straight Movie: Bareback Bi Sex Creampie 3 (U.S. Male)
- Best Foreign Film: Bareback Big Uncut Dicks (U.S. Male)
- Best Versatile Performer: Jason Crew (Jet Set Fraternity Gang Bang 2 – Jet Set Productions)
- Best Newcomer: Tommy Lima (Spanish Playhouse 1 – Alexander Pictures)

== European Gay Porn Awards ==
The European Gay Porn Awards (EGPA) focus mainly on gay porn from Europe, but also recognizes web-based content, non-European companies with European content, and professionals who work internationally.

== See also ==
- List of pornographic film awards
