= Fortune European Businessman of the Year =

Award

Fortune magazine gives an annual award for the person it considers to be the European Businessman of the Year. Fortune is based in the United States, but it has a European edition which features this award prominently. Currently the award is announced in January for the preceding calendar year. Other organisations also issue similar awards.

== Recipients ==
This list is incomplete.

| Year | Image | Choice | Notes |
|---|---|---|---|
| 2001 | | Michael O'Leary | Irish CEO of budget airline Ryanair. |
| 2002 | | | |
| 2003 | | Terry Leahy | British CEO of retailer Tesco. |
| 2004 | | Lakshmi Mittal | British based Indian CEO/majority owner of Mittal Steel Company |
| 2005 | | Patrick Ricard | French Chairman and CEO of Pernod Ricard |
| 2006 | | Gerard Kleisterlee | Dutch CEO of Philips |
| 2007 | | Robert Polet | Dutch CEO of the Gucci Group |
| 2008 | | Wendelin Wiedeking | President and CEO of Porsche |
