= Social Enterprise Association =

Social Enterprise Association (SE Association)
- Industry: Social Enterprises; Social Entrepreneur
- Genre: Association
- Founded: 2009
- Defunct: 2017
- Headquarters: Singapore, Singapore
- Website: Official Website

The Social Enterprise Association, also known as "SE Association", was a platform to bring together social entrepreneurs, social enterprises, academic institutions, and businesses in Singapore. The goal of the SE Association is to strengthen the culture of social entrepreneurship and social enterprises so as to bring about positive social impact within Singapore.

This is done through:

1. Cultivating an environment which supports peer-learning within the social enterprise community
2. Organising capacity building programmes and business services
3. Fostering synergistic partnerships among key stakeholders (the Government, businesses and people)

== History ==
In August 2006, a Social Enterprise Committee chaired by Mr Philip Yeo was formed to explore growth opportunities within the local social enterprise sector. The 26 recommendations provided by the Committee included setting up a Social Enterprise Association and a Social Enterprise Development Centre to cultivate a thriving culture of social entrepreneurship and related enterprises. The Social Enterprise Implementation Committee chaired by Gerard Ee then carried out the relevant operational procedures to materialize the recommendations listed previously. In June 2009, the Association was officially registered as a Company Limited by Guarantee. Currently, SE Association is co-chaired by Mr Seah Kian Peng, CEO (Singapore) of NTUC Fairprice Co-operative Ltd, and Ms Penny Low, President and Founder of Social Innovation Park Ltd. The other two board members are Mr Alfie Othman, director of Ikhlas Holdings Pte Ltd, and Dr Gillian Koh, senior research fellow of the Institute of Policy Studies at Lee Kuan Yew School of Public Policy in the National University of Singapore.

== Community and membership ==
The SE Association's primary objective is to bring about positive social impact and an inclusive community among Singaporeans. It aims, first and foremost, to address the needs and interests of its target community – social enterprises, social entrepreneurs and would-be social innovators (see social innovation) – and then further engage other potential partners from the private sector and government to work on synergistic partnerships to promote the strength of its members and the sector as a whole. SE Association's members are social enterprises, individuals, students, voluntary welfare organisations / non-profit organisations, and corporate. Seminars, talks, focus groups, consultations and networking sessions have been organized by the Association to provide learning opportunities for both members and the public. Their members are mostly located in the social enterprises in Singapore.

== Social Enterprise Development Centre (SEDC) ==
The SEDC belongs to the training and consultancy arm of SE Association. The SEDC was launched in October 2010 to build up the institutional capacity of social enterprises by working alongside social entrepreneurs to nurture and develop their social enterprises from infancy to maturity, and thereafter integrate them with the mainstream business communities.

SEDC offers two main advisory services: SE Start-up Advisory, and SE Business Advisory which includes advice and coaching. Advisory services offered without implementation plans is free- of- charge, but a fee is charged if SEDC is required to facilitate the development and execution of plans or where third party expertise is required. In addition, SEDC offers training and capability-building programmes for social enterprises.
