= NK Horeca =

The NK Horeca, or Dutch National Championship Hospitality, is an annual championship in different branches of hospitality. It currently awards the Golden Chef's Hat for the chef who presents the best four course meal, three awards for the best sandwich: the best sandwich in hospitality, the best sandwich in catering, and a best sandwich for personnel with an intellectual disability, and a flair bartending award. It has been held in its current form at the Horecava since 2007.

== History ==
The NK Horeca has been held in its current form on the Horecava since 2007, where pre-existing award of the Golden Chef's Hat and the award for the best sandwich had been combined. For the 2010 edition, the award for flair bartending was added.

=== The Golden Chef's Hat ===
The Golden Chef's hat was introduced in 1960, then as the Silver Chef's Hat, by Nestlé. In 1996 the award was re-introduced as the Golden Chef's Hat. There are also awards for the best masterchef and student, and the best chef under 25.

=== Best Sandwich ===
An award for the best sandwich was introduced in 1983. Later the distinction between the best sandwich in hospitality and in catering was made. In 2009, the category Lekker Anders was added, for personnel with an intellectual disability.

=== Flair Bartending ===
The award for flair bartending was introduced in the 2010 edition of the NK Horeca.
