= FIJET =

Travel journalist organization

World Federation of Travel Journalists and Writers
- Fédération Internationale des Journalistes et Ecrivains du Tourisme
- Abbreviation: FIJET
- Formation: 1954
- Founded at: Paris
- Members: National Organizations and Individual Members
- Secretary General: Marijana Rebic
- President: Tijani Haddad
- Main organ: General Assembly
- Website: http://fijet.net/

FIJET (Fédération Internationale des Journalistes et Ecrivains du Tourisme; in English World Federation of Travel Journalists and Writers) is a professional organization of travel journalists and travel writers.

== History ==
4 Dec 1954, Paris (France), at the suggestion of French and Belgian travel journalists' and writers' associations. Previously also referred to in English as International Federation of Travel Journalists and Writers. By-laws adopted by the General Assembly at the 2006 FIJET World Congress in Karlovy Vary and amended at the 2008 FIJET World Congress in Slovenia, the 52nd FIJET World Congress in Turkey in 2012, the 56 World Congress in Hungary in 2014 and in 58th Fijet congress in Moscow.

== Objectives ==
The principal and permanent objectives of FIJET are:

1.	To study conditions necessary for the development of tourism and for the right to enjoy leisure activities in all countries,
2.	To contribute to the distribution of freely available, objective, complete, and original information of the highest quality on tourism matters while complying with the ethics of the journalistic profession,
3.	To provide a link between tourism authorities and the general public,
4.	To enable members of National Associations to carry out their functions through implementation of information journeys known as press trips or familiarization (FAM) trips,
5.	To set up documentation centers to support activities of the Federation and the National Associations,
6.	To enhance the stature of journalists and tourism writers in the eyes of the public and of organizations involved with tourism,
7.	To encourage the specialization of young journalists in tourism and the creation of an International Center for tourism,
8.	To foster the foundation of National Associations of Journalists and Tourism Writers in all countries,
9.	To organize International Conferences
10.	To publish professional printed and online publications dedicated to tourism and tourism issues and journalistic efforts related to tourism.

== The Golden Apple Award ==
"La Pomme d'Or" or "The Golden Apple" is the FIJET equivalent of the Oscar, established in 1970. This award for excellence is presented each year to an organization, country, city, or person in recognition of superior efforts in promoting and raising the level of tourism.

== FIJET Academy ==
The FIJET Young Journalists Program provides an opportunity for young journalists to work with experienced tourism journalists and visit some tourism resorts.

The program includes seminars, workshops and hands-on learning experiences. Participating journalists are also given tours and opportunities to meet and talk with tourism professionals.

Participating students collaborate on writing and presenting an article or report (to be selected by the students) during the course of studies. Students are also required to write (for print publications) or produce (for radio and television) a report on the host country. x
