= Independent Petroleum Association of America =

Oil and gas lobbying group

The Independent Petroleum Association of America (IPAA) is a lobbying group for oil and gas producers in the United States.

== Overview ==
It was founded on June 10, 1929, by President Herbert Hoover. It is headquartered in Washington, D.C.

In 2019, Politico reported that the group spends more than $1 million per year on lobbying activities. The group disdained the policies of the Obama administration, with IPAA vice president Jeff Eshelman saying in a leaked recording that Obama administration had a "target list of everything that they wanted done to shut down the oil and gas industry." The group approved of the Trump administration's policies, with IPAA CEO Barry Russell boasting in a leaked recording that the IPAA had "unprecedented access to people that are in these positions who are trying to help us, which is great."

In 2012, it produced the documentary Truthland, a response to Gasland.

== See also ==
- Fossil fuels lobby – Lobbying supporting the fossil fuels industry
