= Beacon of ICT Awards =

Annual award present by ICT in Nigeria

- Awarded for: Outstanding contributions to ICT development in Nigeria
- Country: Nigeria
- Presented by: Nigeria CommunicationsWeek
- First award: March 2009

The Beacon of ICT Awards also known as BoICT Awards are annual ICT awards recognizing organizations' or individuals' contributions to ICT development in Nigeria. The award is organized by Ken Nwogbo, the founder and Editor-in-Chief of Nigeria CommunicationsWeek, a leading Nigerian ICT newspaper published in Lagos State, Nigeria.

== History ==
The award was established in March 2009 by Ken Nwogbo, a Nigerian columnist and founder of Communication Week Media Limited, publishers of Nigeria CommunicationsWeek, a leading Nigerian information and communications technology newspaper, headquartered in Okota, Lagos State. The 4th edition of the award was held on 20 April 2013 at Eko Hotels and Suites, with Ernest Ndukwe, the former Chairman of the Nigerian Communications Commission, as the guest of honour. The theme of the 6th edition, held on Saturday 25 April 2015 again at Eko Hotel, was “Mobile Money & Financial Inclusion: Fueling IT with Telecommunications”.
