= Pomme d'Or =

European prize in tourism industry

The Pomme d'Or (French: golden apple) is a prize for excellence in the tourism industry awarded by FIJET, the European association of professional travel writers and journalists. It is awarded yearly to an organization, location or person for recognising superior efforts in promoting and raising the level of tourism.

List of recipients:

- 1971 - Italy, Sicily
- 1971 - Belgium, Bokrijk
- 1971 - Netherlands, Efteling
- 1972 - Yugoslavia, Sveti Stefan
- 1972 - Hungary, Estergone
- 1972 - Ireland, "horse carriage excursions/holidays"
- 1973 - France, Thoiry-en-Yvelines
- 1973 - Belgium, Arthur Haulot (General Commissioner of Tourism)
- 1974 - United Kingdom, York
- 1975 - Romania, Bukovina
- 1976 - West Germany, Rothenburg ob der Tauber
- 1977 - Not presented
- 1978 - Yugoslavia, Sarajevo
- 1979 - Bulgaria, Rila Monastery
- 1980 - France, Pézenas
- 1981 - Spain, Robert Lonati (Secretary General of World Tourism Organization - WTO)
- 1982 - Soviet Union, Suzdal
- 1983 - Finland, Turku
- 1984 - Turkey, Antalya
- 1985 - Spain, Palos de la Frontera
- 1986 - Poland, Kraków
- 1987 - Cyprus, Nicosia
- 1988 - Portugal, Funchal/Madeira and Greece, Mont Pelion
- 1989 - Not presented
- 1990 - Colombia, Cartagena de Indias
- 1991 - Tunisia, Utinah
- 1992 - Not presented
- 1993 - Belgium, Antwerpen
- 1994 - Egypt, South Sinai
- 1995 - Cuba, Santiago de Cuba
- 1996 - Spain, Caceres
- 1996 - Dubrovnik, Croatia
- 1997 - Russia, Moscow and Yuri Luzhkov (ex-mayor of Moscow)
- 1998 - Not presented
- 1999 - Not presented
- 2000 - Belgium, Mol Lake District
- 2001 - Lebanon, City of Tyr
- 2002 - Egypt, Sharm el Sheikh
- 2003 - Turkey, Nemrut Dag
- 2004 - Czech Republic, Brno
- 2005 - Croatia, Split
- 2006 - Spain, Calpe
- 2009 - Spain, Cantabria & three locations in Romania: Sibiu, Danube Delta and Blue Air
- 2010 - Egypt, Luxor
- 2011 - Croatia
- 2012 - Caltagirone (Italy), Hamamönü (Turkey), Alexandria (Egypt), Foundation Kobarov (Slovenia) and Český Krumlov
- 2013 - Opatija (Croatia)
- 2014 - Targu Jiu (Romania)
- 2015 - Dubrovnik (Croatia); Moscow city (Russia), Palic (Serbia)
- 2016 - Ypres (Belgium), Ljubljana (Slovenia), Plovdiv (Bulgaria)
- 2017 - Kazan (Russia), Bratislava (Slovakia), Konya (Turkey)
- 2018 - Palermo, Ekaterineburg (Russia), Dyarbakir (Turkey)
- 2023 - Timișoara (Romania)
