= PorYes =

- Location: Berlin
- Country: Germany
- Website: www.poryes.de

PorYes is an initiative of sex-positive feminists that advocates for feminist criteria in pornography and honors outstanding depictions of sexuality. Since 2009, the PorYes Award has been held every two years as a feminist European porn film prize in Berlin. The PorYes awards were created as a feminist counter-action to the Venus Awards, a Berlin-based mainstream porn festival.

The PorYes movement developed criteria based on principles from women's movements: sex-positive representations of lust of all genders, women are desired at all levels of the production process, consensus of all those involved in production (working conditions, safer sex, fair pay) and diversity in the representations: both the performers and the demonstration of diverse sexual expressions. Instead of calling for censorship of sexist mainstream pornography, PorYes encourages the production of feminist porn.

The name PorYes alludes to the PorNO campaign, which called for a ban on pornography. The film award ceremony is supported by media outlets including taz, Missy Magazine, Filmlöwin and AvivA. The partner projects include Pro Familia and the Berlin Porn Film Festival. Aktion Mensch and Urania as well as the HAU theater also support the project.

== Aim ==
The festival initiators wanted to revolutionize mainstream porn industries; the initiators of the award wanted to establish PorYes as a certificate[1] to differentiate "the typical, largely sexist and cliché porn from the women- and human-oriented sex-positive porn productions." They have tried to set certain standards of artificial and representative integrity by promoting feminist porn movies.[3] For the PorYes jury, it is especially important that female desire and pleasure is an essential part of the movie, whereas "in mainstream porn the women often look weary and worn out, as if they come from an area of conflict (…)." Porn awarded by PorYes should ideally show more varieties of female desire than mainstream porn does. Moreover, the movies should not lead straightly, or care mainly about, the male orgasm. It is the aim of the awards to show sex-positive depictions of all genders and to celebrate the variety of sexual orientations and bodies.

== Background ==
The sex-positive movement emerged from women’s movements of the 1970’s. In the context of pornography, sex-positivity advocates for “[...] women's right to explore their bodies, sexual desire, and considers that sexual violence does not have to prevent the vindication of female desire.” Although there were many campaigns against porn, for example the famous PorNo campaign of the popular German feminist Alice Schwarzer in 1987, the sex-positivity movement has provided alternative solutions to the feminist issues raised in such campaigns. PorYes also states that "a sex-positive stance often grew out of, or even concurrently shaped, an antipornographic stance."

A demographic shift in the porn market has also led to new considerations for the pornography industry. New research also shows a new interest of women in porn movies within the last 30 years. Furthermore, there has been a rise in categories such as “female friendly” and “woman friendly” on porn streaming platforms. One proposed reason for this shift is a recent change in sexual morality, which influences the sexual behavior of women. However, PorYes states that this does not "change the fact that the majority of leading products are produced under unethical work conditions, often at the cost of the environment." So, PorYes set certain criteria for feminist porn films to inform the public and support discussion around these topics.

== Criteria ==
PorYes has created certain criteria for feminist porn movies.

- A sex-positive attitude, with no misogynistic acts or portrayals of actors.
- Portrayal of lust and pleasure, focus on female lust and its diversity
- A variety of body types, ages, genders, sexual orientations and ethnic backgrounds
- Roles in collusion with those involved / emphasis on enthusiastic consent
- Ethical work conditions and safe sex is encouraged
- Those involved will be shown in relation to one another – eye/skin/hand/body contact and energy exchange.
- Emotions and declarations of love are encouraged
- Variations of sexual practices
- Authentic sound recordings or music; no gender-stereotypical amplified dubbing of moaning
- Orgasms must not be the sole goal of the interaction; a rejection of the classic sexual response cycle
- FLINTA* are significantly involved in the production of the film as producers, directors, or camera women

== PorYes Academy ==
At the end of the PorYes Award ceremony, participants are invited to attend PorYes Academy, a one day workshop that brings in academics and professionals from porn studies, feminist studies, and other adjacent fields. The education component of the event is intended to spark conversations and inspire others to incorporate a feminist/sex-positive ethic into their own work. Some examples of lectures from PorYes Academy include: Porn Studies pioneer, Linda Williams; feminist philosopher, Mari Mikkola; feminist academic, Mireille Miller-Young; legal scholar, Anja Schmidt.

== Initiator ==
The PorYes Awards is primarily arranged by the Freudenfluss Network, which is an open network of adults of different genders, ages and sexual orientations and with the goal to promote sex-positivity and sexual communication. The network was founded by PorYes co-initiators Polly Fannlaf and Laura Méritt. A major supporting organization is Sexclusivitäten, a women-owned feminist sex shop in Berlin. Sexclusivitäten offers online shopping, private consultations, and weekly workshop which are often centered around pleasure, communication, and political engagement. Sexclusivitäten characterizes itself as "the first women-oriented sex-business and the sexual communication center of Europe". The owner of the shop, Laura Méritt, has a PhD in the science of social communication and wide experience as a sexologist. She calls herself a "sex-worker" or "sex-expert". She also founded a lesbian escort service in Berlin.
