= Women in Business Award =

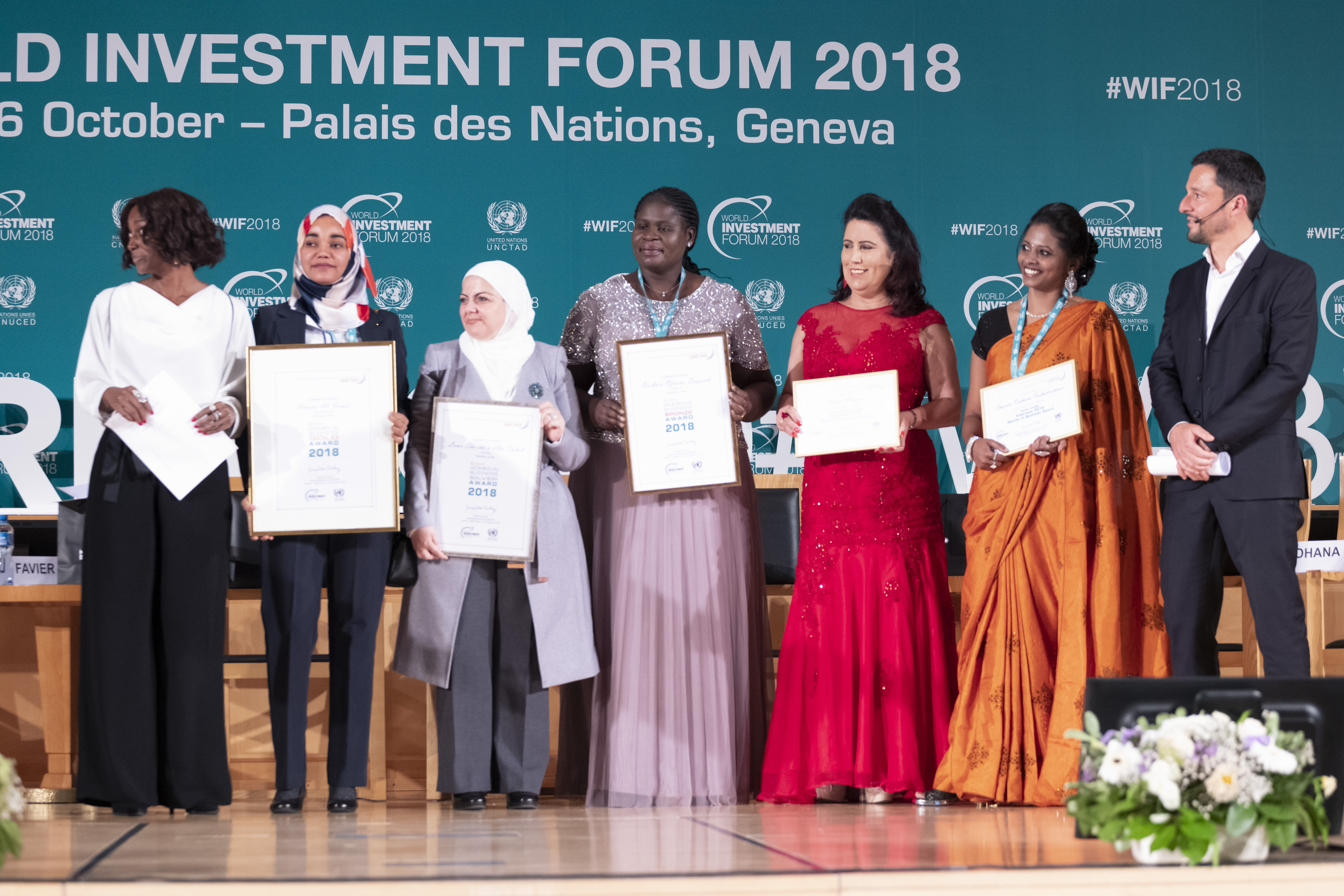
Women in Business Awards in 2018. The winner is at the far left bar one

The Women in Business Award is a biannual award given by the United Nations Conference on Trade and Development (UNCTAD). The competition is restricted to women who have taken part in the EMPRETEC programme. It was first awarded in 2008.

== 2018 ==
The winner of the Gold award in 2018 was Uneiza Ali lssufo, a civil engineer from Mozambique whose contracting company, ConsMoz Lda, employs 800 people. The award was presented in Geneva in October 2018. The judges singled out the emphasis on green construction and the jobs that she had created for women in particular. Issufo and the two runners-up will receive a watch, mentoring and special training. The Silver award was given to Ms. Lama Sha'sha'a from Jordan. She is the founder of International Robotics Academy. The Bronze award was given to Ms. Barbara Ofwono Buyondo, the Principal and founder of Victorious Education Services in Uganda. Two Special recognition awards were also given. Ms. Chandra Vadhana R from India, founder and CEO of 4TuneFactory and Prayaana Labs won a special recognition in Social entrepreneurship for her works done in enabling skill development of girls and women. Ms. Rosana Marques, founder of Ouseuse from Brazil won her special recognition for Export Potential. The Awards were given on October 25 at the Pales Des Nations, Geneva in the presence of dignitaries including Mr. Mukhisa Kituyi, the Secretary-General of UNCTAD.

The other 2018 finalists were

- Rosana Marques (Brazil): Ouseuse, swimwear and lingerie
- Rocio Castro Fernandez (Ecuador): Momoa, clothes for breastfeeding
- Ndey Fatou Njie (The Gambia): TiGA, swimwear
- Chandra Vadhana (India): Skill development, training, assessments and HR consulting
- Lama Sha'sha'a (Jordan): International Robotics Academy, education for 6-16-year-olds in robotics and STEM
- Barbara Ofwono Buyondo (Uganda): Victorious Education Services, kindergarten to primary school education
- Ana de León (Uruguay): Ruta 10 Upcycling, up-cycling design company
- Rina Arráez (Venezuela): Inversiones Alces 1012 C.A., handmade recycled accessories
- Leah Diana Mitaba (Zambia): Butterfly Initiatives, produces vegetables and fruits.

== History ==
Previous winners have been

- 2016: Tran Thi Viet Viet Trang Weaving Handicrafts, Vietnam. Awarded in Nairobi.
- 2014: Lina Jalil Khalifeh, SheFighter, Jordan
- 2012: Melissa de Leon, Panama Gourmet, Panama
- 2010: Beatrice Ayuru Byaruhanga, Lira Integrated School, Uganda
- 2008: Sana Zaal Burgan, Med Grant, Jordan.

== See also ==
- List of awards honoring women
