= EMPRETEC =

EMPRETEC is a United Nations programme established by the United Nations Conference on Trade and Development (UNCTAD) to promote the creation of sustainable, innovative, and internationally competitive small- and medium-sized enterprises (SMEs).

== Programme ==
EMPRETEC is an integrated capacity building programme of UNCTAD in the area of SMEs and entrepreneurial skills promotion. It is dedicated to helping promising entrepreneurs put their ideas into action and fledgling businesses to grow. The programme is part of UNCTAD's mandate on enhancing productive capacity and international competitiveness for the benefit of economic development, poverty eradication and equal participation of developing countries and transition economies in the world economy.

The name EMPRETEC – the Spanish acronym for emprendedores (entrepreneurs) and tecnología (technology) – was first introduced in Argentina in 1988. Since its inception, the EMPRETEC programme has been initiated in 36 countries. Early counties were Brazil, Venezuela, Chile and Uruguay in South America and Ghana, Nigeria and Zimbabwe in Africa.

EMPRETEC's core product, the Entrepreneurship Training Workshop, is based on the research conducted by a psychologist from Harvard University, Professor David McClelland, who had done extensive work on entrepreneurship since the late 1950s. His Need theory proposes that everyone is driven by three needs. The participants in the programme are selected through focused interviews on the basis of both their personal proven entrepreneurial competencies and innovative approach to business. The EMPRETEC programme has the capacity to address other target groups of entrepreneurs (ranging from business leaders and public sectors to entrepreneurs with limited literacy as well as women entrepreneurs). This can be done through a range of customized products that are available upon request.

UNCTAD installs the programme at the requests of its member States and in cooperation with the national public and private sector organizations that are responsible for and contributing to SME development in the country. Although the implementation of the EMPRETEC programme depends on the needs of the beneficiary country, there are several necessary steps to take toward the implementation of the EMPRETEC programme. After the implementation of an EMPRETEC Centre's sustainability through the provision of revenue-generating activities such as Business Development Services (BDS) and UNCTAD's Business Linkages programme.

== Awards ==
Since 2006 the programme has resulted in the Women in Business Awards which are given every two years to the leading woman who has achieved success after EMPRETEC training.
