= Australian Adult Industry Awards =

Australian adult film award

- Date: 2001
- Country: Australia
- Website: http://adultawards.com.au

The Australian Adult Industry Awards (AAIA) is an Australia-wide annual award that has been given out for outstanding achievements in the adult industry including awards for strippers, adult retail shops, film and video production, men’s bars, brothels and escort agencies.

== About ==
AAIA's aim is to establish legitimacy and mainstream acceptance for the industry and its participants. Since its inception in 2001 the AAIA has been owned and operated by sex expert Maxine Fensom. Fensom is well known in the adult industry for founding a number of strip clubs, strippers’ agencies, themed events, and adult online stores. She is also the founder and owner of the national Miss Erotica and Miss Dream Girl pageants.

In 2004, the organisers of the awards became a partner of the Australian Taxation Office (ATO) to encourage 16,000 sex workers to declare their income. As part of the effort, the ATO sponsored the event.

John Lark won the lifetime achievement award in 2006 for his contribution to the industry as a producer of 20 films featuring Australian stars, including Alice Springs and Kelly Blue.
