= Workflow Management Coalition =

Workflow Management Coalition (WfMC) was a consortium formed to define standards for the interoperability of workflow management systems. The coalition was disbanded in 2019 and no longer exists.

== History ==
The Coalition was founded in May 1993 with original members including IBM, Hewlett-Packard, Fujitsu, ICL, Staffware and approximately 300 software and services firms in the business software sector.

Over its history, the WfMC had four chairpersons:

| Name | Years |
|---|---|
| Dave Shorter | 1994-1998 |
| Nick Kingsbury | 1998-2000 |
| Jon Pyke | 2000-2010 |
| Keith Swenson | 2010-2019 |

The WfMC regarded its work as complete as of 2019 and is now accordingly disbanded, while all WfMC-supported awards are now closed. The successful conclusion of its work is reflected in numerous frameworks, standards and languages in the workflow and business process space.

== Standards work ==
Since its founding, the use of XML has become more widespread. The Coalition's focus was principally around the process definition file interchange, using the standard XML Process Definition Language (XPDL).

=== Workflow Reference Model ===
The Workflow Reference Model was published first in 1995 and still forms the basis of most business process management (BPM) and workflow software systems in use today. It was developed from the generic workflow application structure by identifying the interfaces which enable products to interoperate at a variety of levels. All workflow systems contain a number of generic components which interact in a defined set of ways; different products will typically exhibit different levels of capability within each of these generic components. To achieve interoperability between workflow products a standardised set of interfaces and data interchange formats between such components is necessary. A number of distinct interoperability scenarios can then be constructed by reference to such interfaces, identifying different levels of functional conformance as appropriate to the range of products in the market. Other WfMC standards make reference to this model.

=== XPDL (XML Process Definition Language) ===
XPDL is an XML based language for describing a process definition, developed by the WfMC. The goal of XPDL is to store and exchange the process diagram, allowing one tool to model a process diagram, another to read the diagram and edit, yet another to "run" the process model on an XPDL-compliant BPM engine, and so on. It is not a compiled executable programming language like BPEL, but specifically a process design format that literally represents the "drawing" of the process definition process syntax of business process models, as well as extended product attributes. Thus it has ‘XY' or vector coordinates, including lines and points that define process flows. This allows an XPDL to store a one-to-one representation of a BPMN process diagram. For this reason, XPDL is effectively the file format or "serialization" of BPMN, as well as any non-BPMN design method or process models which use in their underlying definition the XPDL meta-model.

There are presently about 60 tools which use XPDL for storing process models.

==== Versions ====
- Version 1.0 was released in 2002.
- Version 2.0 was released in Oct 2005.
- In spring 2012, the WfMC completed XPDL 2.2 as the fifth revision of this specification. XPDL 2.2 builds on version 2.1 by introducing support for the process modeling extensions added to BPMN 2.0.

=== BPSim ===
The Business Process Simulation framework is a standardized specification that allows business process models captured in either BPMN or XPDL to be augmented with information in support of rigorous methods of analysis. It defines the parameterization and interchange of process analysis data allowing structural and capacity analysis of process models. BPSim is meant to support both pre-execution and post-execution optimization of said process models. The BPSim specification consists of an underlying computer-interpretable representation (meta-model) and an accompanying electronic file format to ease the safeguard and transfer of this data between different tools (interchange format).

=== Wf-XML ===
Wf-XML is designed and implemented as an extension to the OASIS Asynchronous Service Access Protocol (ASAP). ASAP provides a standardized way that a program can start and monitor a program that might take a long time to complete. It provides the capability to monitor the running service, and be informed of changes in its status. Wf-XML extends this by providing additional standard web service operations that allow sending and retrieving the “program” or definition of the service which is provided. A process engine has this behavior of providing a service that lasts a long time, and also being programmable by being able to install process definitions.

== Award programs ==
The Workflow Management Coalition sponsored three annual award programs:

1. The "Global Awards for Excellence in BPM & Workflow" recognized organizations that had implemented particularly innovative workflow solutions. Every year between 10 and 15 BPM and workflow solutions were recognized in this manner. WfMC published the case studies in the annual Excellence in Practice series.
2. WfMC inaugurated a Global Awards program in 2011 for Adaptive Case Management case studies to recognize and focus upon ACM use cases. Adaptive Case Management, also known as Dynamic or Advanced Case Management, was a new technological approach to supporting knowledge workers in leading edge organizations. These awards were designed to highlight the best examples of technology to support knowledge workers. In 2012 nine teams were awarded top honors at the ACM Live Event and are featured in the book, "How Knowledge Workers Get Things Done." In 2013, WfMC updated the program to “WfMC Awards for Excellence in Case Management” to recognize the growing deployment of Production Case Management and the winning teams are featured in the book "Empowering Knowledge Workers."
3. The Marvin L. Manheim Award For Significant Contributions in the Field of Workflow was given to one person every year in recognition of individual contributions to workflow and BPM standards. This award commemorated Marvin Manheim who played a key motivational role in the founding of the WfMC.
