= Sexy Hot Award =

Brazilian pornographic film awards

Prêmio Sexy Hot
- Sponsored by: Sexy Hot
- Location: São Paulo, São Paulo (state)
- Country: Brazil
- Presented by: Sexy Hot
- Reward: Trophy
- First award: 2014; 12 years ago
- Final award: 2017
- Website: Official website

The Sexy Hot Awards (in Brazilian: Prêmio Sexy Hot) are pornographic film awards in Brazil.

== Structure ==
The Sexy Hot Awards are sponsored and presented by the Brazilian adult cable channel Sexy Hot, and are meant to "encourage and recognize the work" of actors, actresses, producers and directors in Brazil's pornographic industry.

Formerly called PIP (Prêmio da Industria Pornô), the ceremony came to be called the Prêmio Sexy Hot from its 2nd edition.

In order to ensure impartiality, some winners are named by popular vote on the internet, whole others by a technical jury. On the 3rd edition Xico Sá, Clara Aguillar and David Cardoso won Best Director, Best Title, Best Lesbian, and Best Trans Scene for their films. On the 4th edition, the jury was composed by Stanlay Miranda, Mariana Baltar, Rafinha Bastos, and Paulo Cursino.

== Winners ==
	2014	2015	2016	2017	2018	2019
Best New Starlet	Renatinha Gaúcha	Rebeca Rios	Aline Rios	Elisa Sanches	Danny Mancini	
Best Actress	Fabiane Thompson	Angel Lima	Melissa Pitanga	Patrícia Kimberly	Elisa Sanches	DreadHot
Best Actor	Ed Júnior	Yuri	Vinny	Loupan	Nego Catra	Loupan
Best Title	Transa ao Tom de Cinza	A Culpa é das Bucetas	Fight for fuck	Loucuras de Casal	[Des] Conectados	La casa de Raquel
Best Anal Sex Scene	Anal maníacas 2	Darlene Amaro & Yuri – A culpa é das Bucetas	Soraya Carioca & Fábio Lavatti – Fábio Gump – O comedor da história	Elisa Sanches & Yuri – Sexy Blonde	Emme White & Yuri – Bruxas	
Best Double Penetration Sex Scene	Meninas Más	Melissa Alecxander, Ed Jr. & Tony Tigrão – Taras & BDSM	Patrícia Kimberly, Tony Tigrão & Ed Jr. – As fantasias de Paty	Ana Julia, Eduardo Lima & Jack kallahari – Molhadinhas e Meladinhas 2		
Best Oral Sex Scene	Profissão: Atriz Pornô	Melissa Pitanga & Yuri – A mulher do meu amigo	Mila Spook, Bárbara Costa, Yago Ribeiro & Alemão – Duelo de boquete 2	Emme White & Erick Fire – Desejos Femininos	Emme White & Yuri – Bruxas	
Best Fetish Scene	Bundas Alucinantes	Patrícia Kimberly & Alemão – Pés do prazer	Patrícia Kimberly, Tony Lee & Corno Mor – Cornolândia 3	Nego Catra & Sandy Cortez – Masturbatrix 9	Mia Linz & Ricardo – Cabine Erótica	
Best Orgy/Gang Bang Scene	Amigas da Minha Irmã	Prince, Nicole Bittencourt, Britney Bitch & Yara – Garotas da Van em Prince, o Gostosão	Patrícia Kimberly, Giovana Bombom, Kojac, Vinny Burgos & Yuri – Orgia na piscina	Emme White, Mel Fire, Angel Lima, Fabi Thompson & Patrícia Kimberly – Orgasmos Múltiplos		
Best New Starlet (LGBT)		Bianca Hills	Grazzie	Mel Fire	DreadHot	
Best Actress/Actor (LGBT)		Mayanna Rodrigues				
Best Movie Scene		Taras & BDSM				
Best Movie Scene (LGBT)		Gatas e gatas 2				
Best Director		Marcos Morais	Binho	Marco Cidade	Mila Spook	Fabio Silva
Best Ménage Scene			Patrícia Kimberly, Tony & Ed. Jr. – As fantasias de Paty	Grazy Moraes, Sol Soares & Renan Cobra – As Aventuras de Grazy	Patrícia Kimberly, Marcos Sampaio & Rob – Encontro com os Fãs 2	
Best Actress (LGBT)			Bárbara Costa	Emme White	Patrícia Kimberly	Patrícia Kimberly
Best Actor (LGBT)			Andy Star	Kaleb		
Best Actress (Trans)			Bruna Butterfly	Carol Penélope		
Best Lesbian scene			Grazzie Borges, Jully DeLarge & Mila Spook – Tatuadas hard core 4	Emme White & Grazzie – Sessões de Fetiche 3	Fernandinha Fernandez, Fabiane Thompson & Emme White – Serviço completo	
Best Trans Scene			Sheyla Wandergirlt & Yago Ribeiro – Trannybrazil	Grazi Cinturinha, Victoria Carvalho & Erick Fire – Doutor Ponha no meu Rabo Por Favor		

== See also ==
- AVN Award
