= Christopher N. Smith =

American lawyer (born 1964)

- Smith receives the Georgia 2007 Governor's Award
- Born: December 30, 1964 (age 61); Macon, Georgia, U.S.
- Occupations: Attorney at Law & Honorary Consul of the Kingdom of Denmark
- Known for: Founder Annual Georgia European Union Summit
- Website: chrissmithlegal.com

Christopher N. Smith (born December 30, 1964) is an American lawyer, appointed as a foreign consul by Margrethe II to Denmark.

== Biography ==
A seventh-generation Georgian, Christopher N. Smith was born in Macon, Georgia in 1964 to Robert Lee and Teresa W. Smith. He grew up in Houston County, Georgia. After graduating from Warner Robins High School, he attended the University of Georgia in Athens, Georgia. Christopher N. Smith received his Bachelor of Business Administration degree in 1988. In 1991, Smith received his Juris Doctor Degree from the Walter F. George School of Law at Mercer University and was admitted into the practice of law that year. Smith has practiced law in Georgia since 1991. He is admitted to practice before the Court of Appeals and the Supreme Court of Georgia and the Supreme Court of the United States.

== Consular appointment ==
In 2006, Her Majesty Queen Margrethe II of Denmark appointed him Honorary Consul of the Kingdom of Denmark. He is the first Honorary Consul in the history of Macon.

== Awards ==
- 2006: Received the AGEUS Award for Individual Contribution
- 2007: Awarded with the "Distinguished Service" award by the Georgia's International Cherry Blossom Festival
- 2007: Received the Governor's International Award for Individual Contribution.

== Founding and involvement ==
Christopher N. Smith is the co-founder of the Smith-Horne Forum Speaker Series and the founder of the Annual Georgia European Union Summit (AGEUS). Smith has been actively involved as guest lecturer at the University of Georgia, Wesleyan College, Macon State College, Georgia College and State University, and was also a featured speaker at the Danish American Business Forum in Copenhagen and Aarhus (2003, 2004, and 2006).

Smith serves on the Board of Directors of the Finnish-American Chamber of Commerce, the Danish American Chamber of Commerce and the Keep Macon-Bibb Beautiful Commission. A frequent lecturer, Smith is an advocate of increasing international investment and trade in Georgia. He promotes and encourages Georgia companies to export. Smith delivered a speech titled "Export Now" to members of the Birmingham Committee on Foreign Relations in which he discussed opportunities and issues of American companies engaged in global commerce.

Smith promotes Danish cultural events in Georgia and recently welcomed popular Danish singer Tina Dico when she performed in Atlanta on February 2, 2011. Promoting international trade and culture, in April 2011, he appeared on Global Matters with Solange Warner, founder of the World Chamber of Commerce, speaking on how trade and foreign direct investment is increasing and creating jobs throughout the state of Georgia.
