= Anne Ashworth =

British feminist activist

Anne Frances Ashworth
- Born: 1842; Bath, Somerset, England
- Died: 1921 (aged 78–79)
- Occupation: suffragist
- Organization(s): National Society for Women's Suffrage, Edinburgh National Society for Women's Suffrage, Manchester Society for Women's Suffrage
- Relatives: Lilias Ashworth Hallett (sister), Jacob Bright (uncle), Ursula Mellor Bright (aunt, by marriage), John Bright (uncle), Margaret Bright Lucas (aunt), Priscilla Bright McLaren (aunt), John Kynaston Cross (brother-in-law)

Anne Frances Ashworth (1842 – 1921) was a British suffragist. She was a member of the National Society for Women's Suffrage, Edinburgh National Society for Women's Suffrage, and Manchester Society for Women's Suffrage.

== Family ==
Ashworth grew up in a Quaker family in Bath, Somerset. Her father, Thomas Ashworth, was a friend of radical MP Richard Cobden. Her uncles Jacob Bright and John Bright were both liberal politicians with an interest in feminism and her aunts Margaret Bright Lucas and Priscilla Bright McLaren campaigned for women's rights.

== Activism ==
Together with her sister, Lilias Ashworth Hallett, Ashworth signed the 1866 petition for women's suffrage. She became a founder member of the London National Society for Women's Suffrage and, on the request of Clementia Taylor, Anne and Lilias formed a Bath branch of the group. She served on its executive committee, and when the Central Committee of the National Society for Women's Suffrage was set up in 1872, Anne also sat on its executive.

In 1871, the first elections were held to the Bath School Board, and Ashworth was elected, one of only seven women around the country to win a seat at the initial elections. From 1873, she sat on the executive of the Married Women's Property Committee, and she also held membership of the Edinburgh National Society for Women's Suffrage and the Bristol and West of England Society. She did not address meetings, but supported the groups organisationally, financially, and by providing her home, Claverton Lodge, for speakers to rest after they had completed a tour.

== Marriage and later life ==
Ashworth married Joseph Cross, brother of Liberal MP John Kynaston Cross, in 1877. They moved to Cross' house in Bolton, and Ashworth joined the Manchester Society for Women's Suffrage, serving on its executive, remaining a vice-president of the group as late as 1907.

Ashworth died in 1921.
