= Margaret Bright Lucas =

English temperance activist and suffragist (1818–1890)

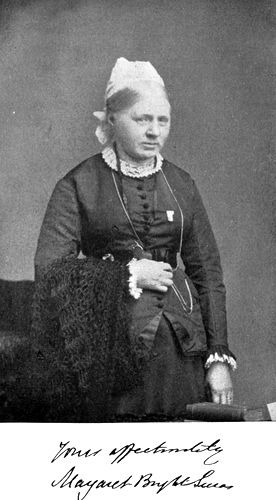
- Born: Margaret Bright; 14 July 1818; Rochdale, England
- Died: 4 February 1890 (aged 71); London, England
- Occupations: Activist, Suffragist
- Spouse: Samuel Lucas (m. 1839; died in 1865)
- Relatives: John Bright (brother), Jacob Bright (brother), Priscilla Bright McLaren (sister), Anne Ashworth (niece), Lilias Ashworth Hallett (niece)

Margaret Bright Lucas (14 July 1818 – 4 February 1890) was an English temperance activist and suffragist. She served as president of the British Women's Temperance Association (BWTA), the World's Woman's Christian Temperance Union (WCTU), and the Bloomsbury branch of the Women's Liberal Association.

She first took part in public affairs on the occasion of the great bazaar in May 1845 at the Covent Garden Theatre, when £25,000 was raised to further the anti-Corn Laws agitation, and she afterwards aided her husband in his various public projects. In 1870, she visited the United States, when she began to take a deepened interest in temperance reform and the women's suffrage question. She subsequently engaged in the work of the Association for the Abolition of State Regulation of Vice, and became president of the British Women's Temperance Association, of which she was one of the chief founders. Her annual addresses were always marked with deep earnestness. She paid a second visit to the U.S. in 1886, in order to attend a convention at Minneapolis as president of the World's WCTU.

== Early life and education ==
Margaret Bright was born on 14 July 1818 at Rochdale, Lancashire. Her father was Jacob Bright (1775–1851), member of the Society of Friends, and a cotton mill proprietor; and her mother, his second wife, Martha Wood (1788–1830).

A member of a well known Quaker family, several of her ten siblings, including John Bright, Priscilla Bright McLaren and Jacob Bright, became prominent in politics, activism and reform. Her sister in law was Ursula Bright. Educated by the Society of Friends, she commented: ‘I developed slowly for we were strictly brought up and told that "children should be seen and not heard"'.

== Career ==
Margaret married Samuel Lucas (1811–1865), a cousin, on 6 September 1839. Samuel, a fellow Quaker, was a London corn exchange merchant. The couple went to Manchester in 1845, when Samuel became involved in a cotton mill. The family moved back to London in 1850. Lucas became interested in politics during the anti-corn law protests in 1845. She aided her husband with the organisation of meetings and the raising of finances. Until her husband's death in 1865, however, her main burdens remained within the family, including the rearing of her two children, Samuel, a deaf mute, and Katharine. By 1870, both children had married, Katharine to John Pennington Thomasson (later MP for Bolton).

=== Early political activism ===
Relieved from her family duties, Lucas was free to seek a clear plan to fit her Quaker moral ambitions. In 1870, suffering from a chest infection, and feeling she needed a change of climate, she travelled to Halifax, Nova Scotia to visit a cousin, Esther Blakey. Lucas easily mixed in the trans-Atlantic reform society that included strong Quaker involvement. Many suffragists and temperance reformers in the northeastern United States welcomed her as 'John Bright's sister'. She would later reciprocate the same level of hospitality when American reformers came to Britain.

The U.S. visit was a focal point in Lucas' public temperance career. There, she was able to experience 'the advanced views and institutions of a less trammelled social system', influences she found 'congenial'. Having signed the temperance pledge at the age of sixteen, she joined the American Independent Order of Good Templars in 1872, and became a grand worthy vice-templar in 1874. The Good Templars organised the British tour of 'Mother' Eliza Stewart, whose participation in the protests against saloons in the Women's Crusade led to the creation of the Woman's Christian Temperance Union (WCTU) in 1874.

=== Temperance and suffrage ===
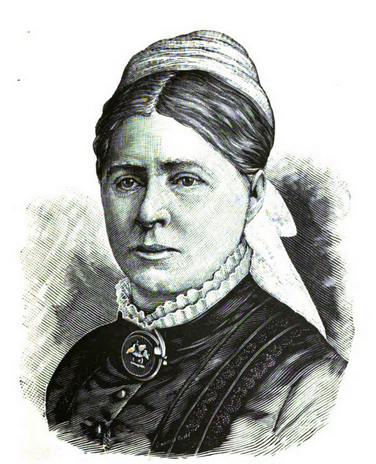
Margaret B. Lucas (1888)

Lucas and Thompson spoke at a meeting in Newcastle upon Tyne in 1876 which stimulated the founding of the BWTA and the White Ribbon Association. Lucas was elected BWTA president, in 1878, but she also supported peace and anti-prostitution work, and served on the executive committees of the National Society for Women's Suffrage and the Ladies National Association for the Repeal of the Contagious Diseases Acts. Her main concern being temperance, she remained BWTA president until her death. In 1885, American WCTU leader Frances Willard selected Lucas as first president of the World's WCTU. This emphasised the organisation's global commitment. Consequently, Lucas crossed the Atlantic again in 1886 to attend the WCTU convention in Minneapolis, at which she was warmly received.

Lucas embodied the phase of women's temperance that saw the movement's power as being primarily in the home and in the superiority of women's moral virtues. In her fourth annual report she commented: ‘I believe (that) in the household, women have a greater power over men, than men have over women, in inducing abstinence from intoxicating drinks’. During the 1870s, she also made increasingly conservative assessments of the reality of the British position regarding social protest. British women would not, Lucas believed, emulate the American crusade marches. ‘It is hardly likely we can go through the streets and kneel at the doors of the gin palaces’, she reasoned, but temperance women in Britain could hold processions and assemblies. They could also lobby, and in 1879, she presented the first women's petition in favour of Sunday closing to the House of Commons.

By 1883–4, it was becoming clear that the general failure to convert men to temperance required a more radical conclusion: ‘The conviction grows upon me that while Petitions educate the workers and the people something more is needed to make them effectual’. Had not ‘the time come’, she wondered, ‘when it becomes a duty to claim the right to vote on the side of Temperance?’. In spite of this, the BWTA remained only one of several women's temperance organisations, and it did not enter its major period of expansion until after her death. As president of the Bloomsbury branch of the Women's Liberal Association, she lost no opportunity in all her public addresses of emphasizing the fact that temperance legislation, to be successful, required woman's vote.

=== Death ===
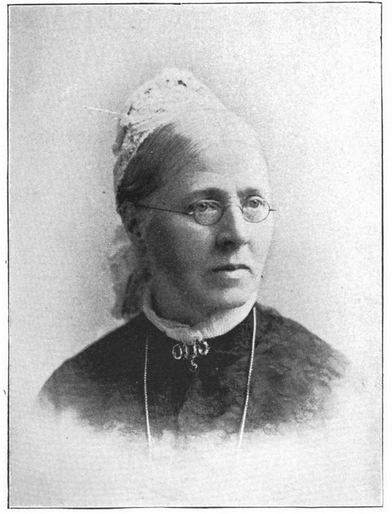
Margaret Bright Lucas

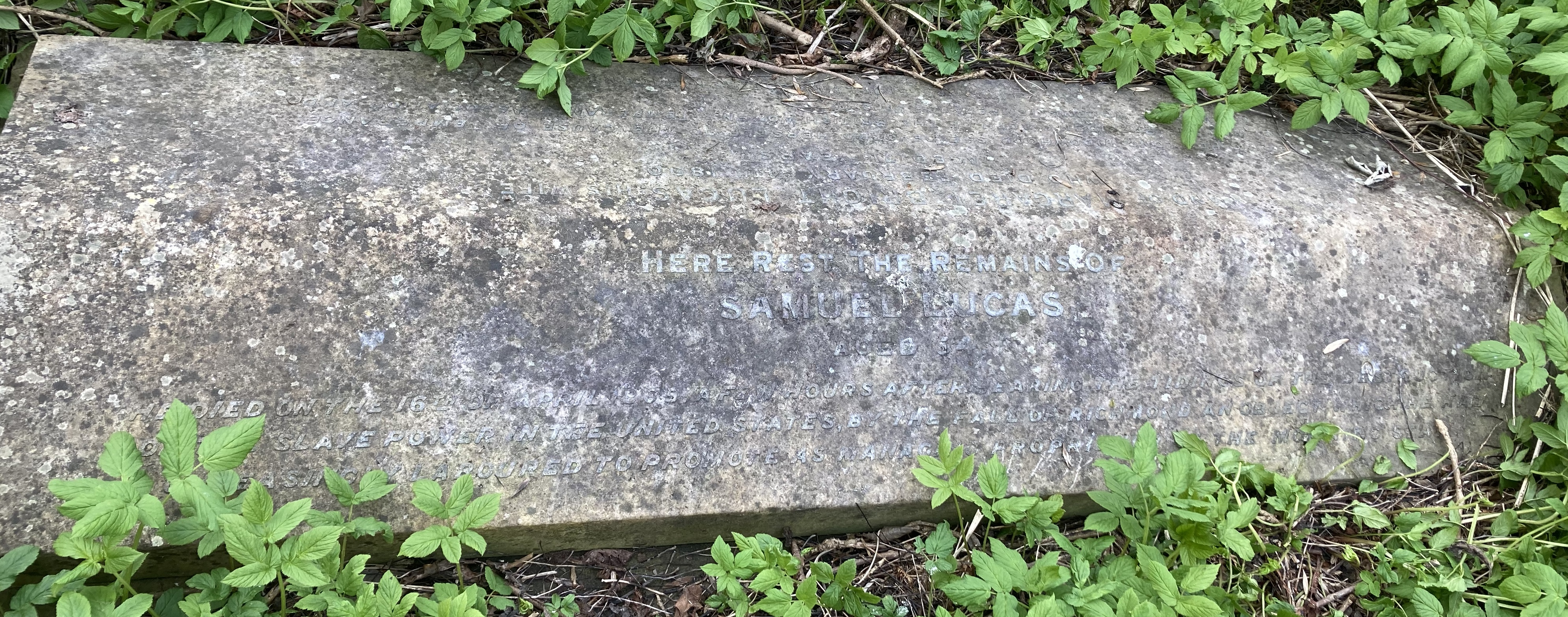
Grave of Samuel and Margaret Lucas in Highgate Cemetery

Lucas died from tuberculosis on 4 February 1890 at her London home, 7 Charlotte Street, Bloomsbury, and was buried in Highgate cemetery with her husband.

Friends and colleagues described Lucas variously as a 'homely British matron', 'well-preserved, erect and vigorous', an 'earnest speaker', and 'tall and stately'. She had an impressive shock of silvery hair into her sixties. The BWTA achieved greater success under her successor, Lady Henry Somerset, but ultimately, British temperance was destined to achieve less than its American counterpart. Lucas was, however, an important link in the Anglo-American women's reform networks as well as being a pioneer in British women's temperance. In 2007, the grave of Margaret and Samuel Lucas was given listed status by the English Heritage in honor of their work in the anti-slavery movement.
