= Governor's Award =

Governor's Award or Governors Awards may refer to:

- Governor of South Australia's Awards
- Governor's Award (Albania)
- Governors Award (Primetime Emmy Awards)
- Governors Awards, an annual award ceremony hosted by the Academy of Motion Picture Arts and Sciences in the U.S.
