= Lilias Ashworth Hallett =

British suffragist

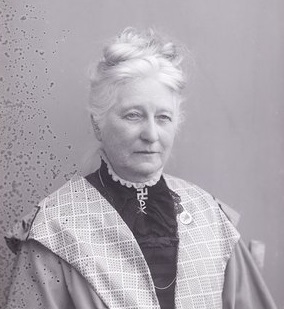
- in 1910
- Born: Lilias Ashworth; 18 April 1844
- Died: 1922 (aged 77–78)
- Organization(s): National Union of Women's Suffrage Societies, Women's Social and Political Union
- Relatives: Anne Ashworth (sister), Margaret Bright Lucas (aunt), John Bright (uncle), Jacob Bright (uncle), Priscilla Bright McLaren (aunt)

Lilias Ashworth Hallett (18 April 1844 – 1922) was a leading British suffragist. She organised, helped to fund activities and was a speaker. She was said to have been "made ill" by the militants but she conceded that it was the militants that created the progress that she had spent years failing to achieve.

== Life ==
Ashworth was born in 1844 to Thomas and Sophia (born Bright) Ashworth. Her mother came from an influential Quaker family and her notable siblings included Margaret Bright Lucas, John Bright, Jacob Bright and Priscilla Bright McLaren. Ashworth was rich and had an income from her father's estate. At the time men had to have property to qualify for a vote. Ashworth joked that her property should enable her to have seven votes.

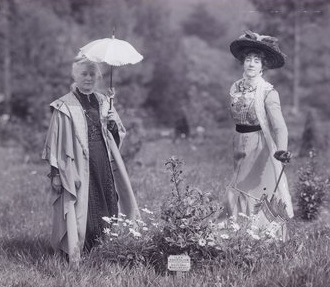
Suffragettes Edith Wheelwright and Lilias Ashworth Hallett in 1911

In 1867 she joined the London Society for Women's Suffrage. Her friends included Lydia Becker and Richard Pankhurst. She was a powerful speaker on the subject of gaining votes for women and she was compared to her uncle Jacob Bright.

From 1870-94 Ashworth served as one of the Honorary Secretaries for the Bristol & West of England Society for Women's Suffrage, based in Bristol. In 1871, she served as a speaker in a large tour organised by the Society around the west country to drum up public support for the suffrage movement. She wrote accounts of the early speaking tours the society organised, and later reflected that "the novelty of hearing women speakers brought crowds to the meetings." A historian of the movement also noted that:

In those days it was an almost unheard of thing for women, and especially such young women, to speak in public, and strange comments were made in the public press. One Editor, in moving a vote of thanks, said:—"He had never heard ladies speak before, and could not help thinking that those who could be so interesting and amusing on a platform must be very pleasant, good comrades to live with at home."

At that time Lilias Ashworth was living with her sister outside of Bath. Both had a considerable personal income and made major donations to the Bristol suffrage society. In Bath, Ashworth Hallett was a member of the Bath branch of the National Union of Women's Suffrage Societies (NUWSS). She spoke "very strongly" in Bath about not allowing party politics to intrude into the suffrage movement.

In 1877 Lilias married Thomas Hallett, who had been appointed as a lecturer in Political Economy at the University of Bristol in 1876. After their marriage she was known as Mrs Lilias Ashworth Hallett.

In 1903, Ashworth Hallett became a member of the executive committee of the NUWSS. She joined the Women's Social and Political Union (WSPU) in 1906 and organised celebrations at the Savoy Hotel when suffragettes were released from Holloway Prison. She was one of the WSPU funders. Starting in 1906 she gave over £160 towards their costs in 1907 and 1908. In the early years of the WSPU, the organisation advertised the support offered by Ashworth Hallett and other Quaker women.

Ashworth Hallett was invited by Mary Blathwayt and her parents to visit Eagle House in 1911. She had been there in 1908 to chair a meeting but this time she was invited to plant a tree. Like the Blathwayts she had mixed feelings about militancy within the suffrage movement. She was said to have been "made ill" by the militants but she confided that it was the militants that were creating the progress that she spent many years failing to achieve.

She died in 1922.
