= List of economics awards =

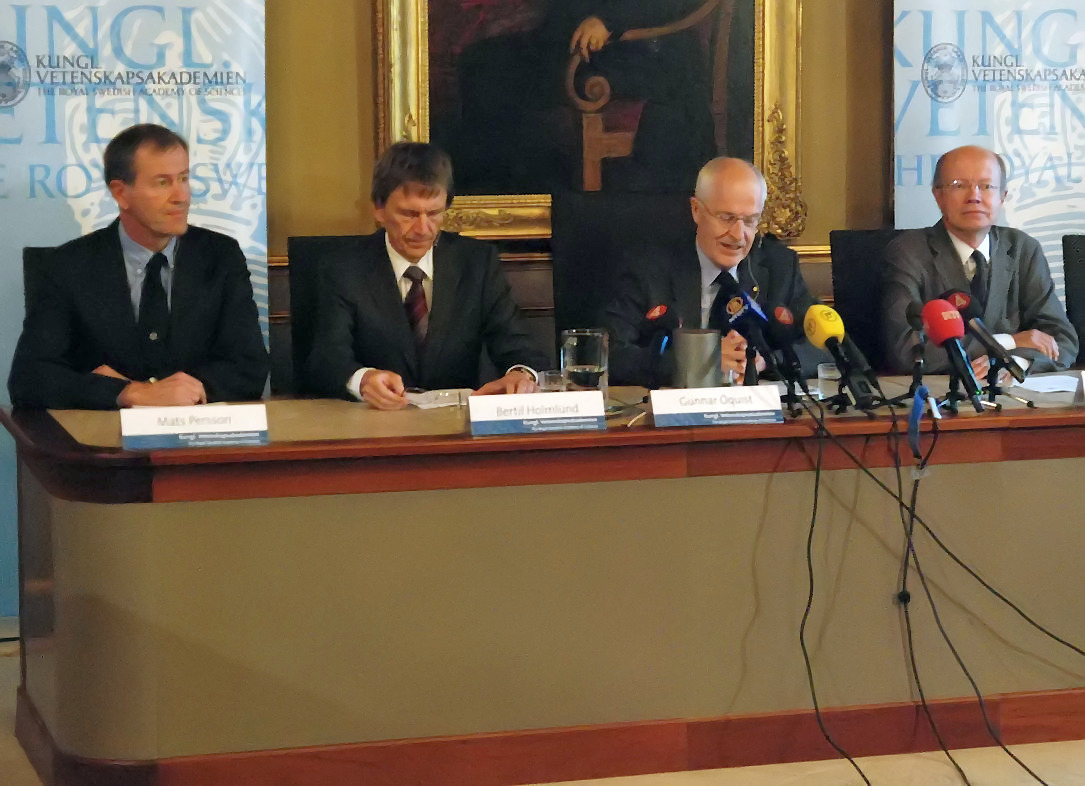
Announcement of the Nobel Memorial Prize in Economic Sciences 2008

This list of economics awards is an index to articles about notable awards for economics. The list is organized by region and country of the sponsoring organization, but awards may be given to economists from other countries.

== General ==
=== Americas ===
Country	Award	Sponsor	Description
United States	Adam Smith Award	National Association for Business Economics	Prominent economists and policy makers that have contributed to business economics
United States	Bernstein Fabozzi Award	Portfolio Management Research	Author of the most voted research article published in The Journal of Portfolio Management
United States	Brattle Prize	Brattle Group	Authors with the best corporate finance research papers published in The Journal of Finance
United States	Elaine Bennett Research Prize	American Economic Association	Outstanding research in any field of economics by a woman not more than seven years beyond her Ph.D.
United States	Erwin Plein Nemmers Prize in Economics	Northwestern University	Major contributions to new knowledge or the development of significant new modes of analysis in the respective disciplines.
United States	Fama-DFA Prize	Journal of Financial Economics	Authors with the best capital markets and asset pricing research papers published in the Journal of Financial Economics
United States	Fischer Black Prize	American Finance Association	Young financial scientist for a body of work that demonstrates significant original research that is relevant to finance practice
United States	Frisch Medal	Econometric Society	Empirical or theoretical applied research published in Econometrica
United States	Graham and Dodd Award	CFA Institute	To recognize excellence in research and financial writing in the Financial Analysts Journal
United States	Jacob Mincer Award	Society of Labor Economists	A lifetime of contributions to the field of labour economics
United States	Jensen Prize	Journal of Financial Economics	Best corporate finance and organizations research papers published in the Journal of Financial Economics
United States	John Bates Clark Medal	American Economic Association	American economist under the age of forty who is adjudged to have made a significant contribution to economic thought and knowledge
United States	Leontief Prize	Global Development and Environment Institute	Outstanding contributions to economic theory that address contemporary realities and support just and sustainable societies
United States	Stephen A. Ross Prize in Financial Economics	Foundation for Advancement of Research in Financial Economics	Most important and impactful original research for understanding the fundamentals of financial economics published in last 15 years
United States	Sloan Research Fellowship	Alfred P. Sloan Foundation	Provide support and recognition to early-career scientists and scholars
United States	Smith Breeden Prize	The Journal of Finance	Best finance research papers published in the Journal of Finance in any area other than corporate finance
United States	William Sharpe Award	Litzenberger Family Foundation etc.	Author of the research article published in the Journal of Financial and Quantitative Analysis which has made the most important contribution to financial economics

=== Asia ===
Country	Award	Sponsor	Description
India	Economic Times Awards	The Economic Times	Business, corporate and government policies, economies in India
Japan	Nakahara Prize	Japanese Economic Association	Japanese economists under the age of 45 whose work has gained international recognition
Malaysia	The Royal Award For Islamic Finance	Central Bank of Malaysia, Securities Commission Malaysia	One exceptional individual who has excelled in advancing Islamic finance globally through outstanding performance and contribution
South Korea	R. K. Cho Economics Prize	Yonsei University	Scholars in the field of economics who have contributed to the development of scholarship and education

=== Europe ===
Country	Award	Sponsor	Description
Albania	Governor's Award	Bank of Albania	Undergraduate dissertations of high scientific standards that concern crucial issues related to the Bank of Albania as well as issues related to the macroeconomic and financial frames of the state
Austria	Kurt Rothschild Prize	Karl Renner Institute	This prize awarded annually by the Karl Renner Institute commemorates the achievements of the Austrian economist Kurt W. Rothschild, who left a lasting mark on science, politics and society in Austria.
Europe	Germán Bernácer Prize	Observatorio del Banco Central Europeo	Young economists who have made outstanding contributions in the fields of macroeconomics and finance
Europe	Hicks-Tinbergen Award	European Economic Association	Author(s) of the best article published in the EEA's journal
Finland	Yrjö Jahnsson Award	Yrjö Jahnsson Foundation	European economists under the age of 45 who have made a contribution in theoretical and applied research that is significant to the study of economics in Europe
France	Prix du meilleur jeune économiste de France	Le Monde, Cercle des économistes	French economists under the age of 40
France	Social Choice and Welfare Prize	Society for Social Choice and Welfare, University of Caen Normandy	One or two young scholars, under the age of 40, in the areas of social choice theory and welfare economics
Germany	Deutsche Bank Prize in Financial Economics	Deutsche Bank	Renowned researchers who have made influential contributions to the fields of finance and money and macroeconomics, and whose work has led to practical and policy-relevant results
Germany	Gossen Prize	Verein für Socialpolitik	German-speaking economists under the age of 45 whose work gained international recognition
Germany	Gustav Stolper Prize	Verein für Socialpolitik	Outstanding scientists who have used economic research to influence the public debate on economic issues, and have contributed substantially to the understanding and solution of current economic problems
Germany	H. C. Recktenwald Prize in Economics	University of Erlangen-Nuremberg	Academic economists. Awarded from 1995 to 2004
Germany	IZA Prize in Labor Economics	IZA Institute of Labor Economics	Outstanding academic achievement in the field of labor economics
Hungary	John von Neumann Award	Rajk László College for Advanced Studies	Outstanding scholar in the exact social sciences, whose works have had substantial influence over a long period of time on the studies and intellectual activity of the students of the college
Italy, Spain	Premio Tiepolo	Italian Chamber of Commerce and Industry in Spain	An Italian and a Spanish personality which have particularly distinguished for their job related to the integration and development of the economic-trade relations between Italy and Spain
Lithuania	Vladas Jurgutis Award	Bank of Lithuania, Lithuanian Academy of Sciences	Significant works (published scientific articles, theses, monographs, textbooks, etc.) in the areas of Lithuanian economy and banking research
Netherlands	Kalai Prize	Game Theory Society	Outstanding articles at the interface of game theory and computer science
Spain	Calvó-Armengol International Prize	Barcelona Graduate School of Economics	Top researcher in economics or the social sciences younger than 40 years old for his or her contribution to the theory and comprehension of the mechanisms of social interaction
Sweden	Assar Lindbeck Medal	Assar Lindbeck Foundation	Economist(s) in Sweden under the age of 45 whose work have gained the most international recognition
Sweden	Nobel Memorial Prize in Economic Sciences	Nobel Prize	Outstanding contributions to the field of economics
United Kingdom	Adam Smith Prize	University of Cambridge	Best performance in the Part IIB Economics Tripos examinations and dissertation
United Kingdom	Exeter Prize	University of Exeter Business School	Best paper published in the previous calendar year in a peer-reviewed journal in the fields of experimental economics, decision theory and behavioral economics
United Kingdom	T. S. Ashton Prize	Economic History Society	Author of the best article accepted for publication in The Economic History Review
United Kingdom	Wolfson Economics Prize	Simon Wolfson, Policy Exchange	New thinking to address major economic policy issues that are not already subject to significant public discourse
United Kingdom	Young Economist of the Year	Royal Economic Society, Financial Times	High school students around the world taking economics courses submit a 1500-word short research paper on one of the economics topics announced annually by the host

== Economic development awards ==
Country	Award	Sponsor	Description
United States	AGEUS Award for Individual Contribution	Annual Georgia European Union Summit	Individual who has shown exceptional success and dedication in fostering foreign economic development in the State of Georgia, USA
India	Economic Times Awards	The Economic Times	Business, corporate and government policies, economies in India
Poland	Polish Economy Hall of Fame	FINEXA (Association of Finance Directors)	Polish economists
Rwanda	Pioneers of Prosperity	Rwanda	Entrepreneurs in Africa, the Caribbean and Central America that have created wealth and invested in their society
International	World Bank Development Marketplace Award	World Bank	Early-stage, innovative projects worldwide
International	World Habitat Awards	Building and Social Housing Foundation	Projects from the Global South as well as the North that provide practical, innovative and sustainable solutions to current housing needs, which are capable of being transferred or adapted for use elsewhere

== See also ==
- Lists of awards
- Lists of science and technology awards
- List of social sciences awards
- List of business and industry awards
