= Georgia Featured Export Product Awards =

The annual Georgia Featured Export Product Awards are a collaborative presentation by the Georgia Department of Economic Development and the Annual Georgia European Union Summit (AGEUS). The awards are presented in Macon, Georgia, United States at the yearly meeting of AGEUS. The awards began in 2007 with the first presentation of the awards on November 8 at the yearly meeting of AGEUS.

Georgia Featured Export Product Award

The awards honor small or medium-sized companies with the most potential for creating employment in Georgia through the export of a unique product made in Georgia.

Only those companies with 150 employees or less, or with annual sales of $50 million or less, qualify to compete for the awards. Companies are evaluated based on their product innovation, market potential and international export efforts.

== Prior Award Winners ==
TEMCOR, Platinum Award 2007 TEMCOR Homepage

Label Vision Systems, Inc., Gold Award 2007 LVS Homepage

Micromeritics Instrument Corporation, Silver Award 2007 Micromeritics Homepage

Benedetto Guitars, 2008 / GDEcD news release

== Further References ==
Global Atlanta Story

Savannah Morning News story

WSAV News story
