= Edith Grey Wheelwright =

British botanist, writer and suffragist (1868–1949)

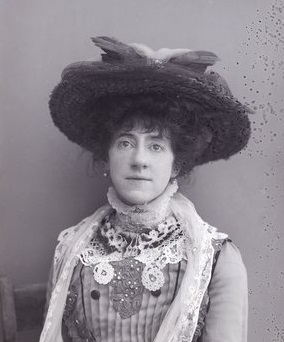
- Born: 1868; Crowhurst, Surrey, England, United Kingdom of Great Britain and Ireland
- Died: 24 September 1949 (aged 80–81); Clevedon, England, United Kingdom
- Education: Oxford
- Occupations: Writer, botanist and suffragette
- Employer: The Girl's Own Paper
- Organization(s): Women's Social and Political Union; National Union of Women’s Suffrage Societies

Edith Grey Wheelwright (1868 – 24 September 1949) was a British writer, suffragist and botanist. She served as Secretary to the Bath Branch of the National Union of Women’s Suffrage Societies (NUWSS) from 1909 through 1913.

== Biography ==
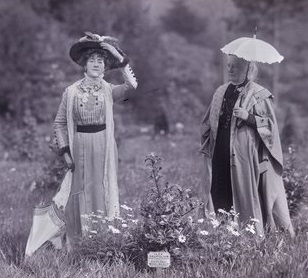
Wheelwright and Lilias Ashworth Hallett, 1911

Wheelwright was born in 1868 in Crowhurst, Surrey, England. She studied botany and geology at the University of Oxford.

She was the author of three novels; The Vengeance of Medea (1894), Anthony Graeme (1895), and A Slow Awakening (1902). Additionally she wrote for the publications The Girl’s Own Paper and Great Thoughts.

Wheelwright initially became involved with the British suffrage movement through the Women’s Social and Political Union (WSPU), but left because she preferred the non-militant stance of the National Union of Women’s Suffrage Societies (NUWSS). She was secretary of the Bath Branch of the NUWSS 1909 through 1913.

In her later years, Wheelwright wrote five books on the subject of medicinal plants and gardening, including The Physick Garden (1935), which was reviewed by The New York Times. She began a friendship with writer and illustrator Beatrix Potter because of their mutual interest in plants.

Wheelwright died on 24 September 1949 in Clevedon, Somerset, England, from accidental coal gas poisoning.
