= T. S. Ashton =

English economist, historian & scholar (1889–1968)

Thomas Southcliffe Ashton
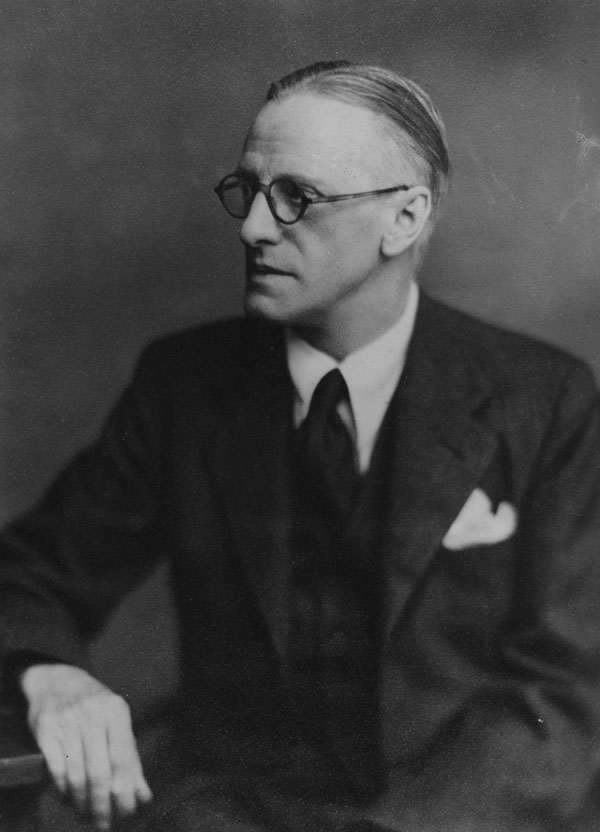
- T. S. Ashton in 1950.
- Born: 11 January 1889; Ashton-under-Lyne, England
- Died: 22 September 1968 (aged 79); Oxford, England
- Occupation: Economic historian
- Known for: Historian

Thomas Southcliffe Ashton (11 January 1889 – 22 September 1968) was an English economic historian. He was professor of economic history at the London School of Economics at the University of London from 1944 until 1954, and Emeritus Professor until his death in 1968. His best known work is the 1948 textbook The Industrial Revolution (1760–1830), which emphasizes the economic and social achievements of the Industrial Revolution in the United Kingdom.

He donated money to provide the T. S. Ashton Prize, an annual award from the Economic History Society. The prize is currently £750 and is awarded at every other annual conference to the author of the best article accepted for publication in the Economic History Review in the previous two calendar years.

Following a BBC Freedom of Information request in January 2012, it was revealed that Ashton turned down a knighthood in 1957.

== Educational career ==
Ashton was educated at the Ashton-under-Lyne secondary school and Manchester University. His academic career was focused on economics and public finance. Ashton was Assistant Lecturer in Economics at the Sheffield University from 1912 to 1919, and from 1919 to 1921, he was Lecturer and Tutor at Birmingham University. In 1921, he was appointed Senior Lecturer in Economics at Manchester University. Eventually, he became Dean of the Faculty of Commerce and Administration and served in this capacity from 1938 to 1944. He then became professor of economic history at the London School of Economics where he served from 1944 to 1954. In 1951 he was elected a Fellow of the British Academy. In 1954 he gave the Ford Lectures at the University of Oxford. He was president of both the Manchester Statistical Society (1938–1940) and the Economic History Society (1960–1963).

== Publications ==
His publications cover the economy of the 18th century and include the iron, steel and coal industries:

- Iron and Steel in the Industrial Revolution (1924)
- The Coal Industry (with Joseph Sykes) (1929)
- Economic and Social Investigations in Manchester 1833–1933 (1934)
- An Eighteenth-Century Industrialist: Peter Stubs of Warrington 1756 – 1806 (1939)
- The Industrial Revolution (1760–1830). London: Oxford University Press. 1948 – via Internet Archive. (1948, 1997) online edition
- "The Standard of Life of the Workers in England. 1790-1830". The Journal of Economic History. 9 (Supplement): 19–38. 1949. JSTOR 2113044.
- Hayek, F. A., ed. (1954). "The Treatment of Capitalism by Historians". Capitalism and the Historians. Chicago: The Chicago University Press. pp. 33 - 63 – via Internet Archive.
- An Economic History of England: the Eighteenth Century. 1955. Archived from the original on 8 October 2012 – via Questia.
- Economic Fluctuations in England 1700–1800 (1959)
- English Overseas Trade Statistics 1697–1808 (1960), by E. B. Schumpeter, edited by T. S. Ashton

Professional and academic associations
| Preceded by Sir E. Raymond Streat | President of the Manchester Statistical Society; 1938–40 | Succeeded by R. C. Reynolds |
