= Manchester Statistical Society =

British learned society

- Formation: 1833; 193 years ago
- Type: learned society
- Registration no.: 1069363
- Legal status: Charity
- Purpose: Collection of facts illustrative of the condition of society, and discussion of subjects of social and political economy
- Headquarters: Manchester, UK
- Region served: Manchester; Greater Manchester
- Official language: English
- Activities: Research; Publications; Lectures; Events
- Collections: Library; Archives
- 101st President: Dr Guy Marshall
- Website: www.manstat.org

The Manchester Statistical Society is a learned society founded in 1833 in Manchester, England. It has a distinguished history, having played an important part in researching economic and social conditions using social surveys. It continues to be active as a forum for the discussion of social and economic issues and also in promoting research.

== Origins and early history ==
The Manchester Statistical Society is one of the oldest statistical societies in the world and the first of its kind in Britain, having been founded in September 1833. This was a time when there was a growing interest in statistics and their use in understanding the state and the problems of society, and a Statistics Section of the British Association for the Advancement of Science had been formed earlier in 1833. The society was the first of around 20 such societies that were either mooted or actually formed in Britain in the early Victorian period; only that in Manchester and what was originally called the Statistical Society of London (now the Royal Statistical Society) still exist.

The founders of the society included three men who had key roles in the Manchester and Salford District Provident Society, also founded in 1833: the secretaries, James Phillips Kay (later Sir James Phillips Kay-Shuttleworth), a doctor, and William Langton, a banker; together with the treasurer, Benjamin Heywood, also a banker. The Provident Society used house-to-house visits to collect information about the needy in Manchester in order to provide support. Another involved in the Statistical Society at the outset was cotton spinner John Kennedy, who had been present at the meeting at which the Statistics Section of the British Association for the Advancement of Science was initiated.

The Statistical Society members were described by Selleck as "imaginative and intellectually ambitious". Many were Whigs, many were Unitarians; and 17 of the 40 members in 1835 worked in the cotton industry. While the society planned to collect facts concerning the inhabitants of the district of Manchester, what was also important was the use to which the findings could be put: it was "a Society for the discussion of subjects of political and social economy, and for the promotion of statistical enquiries, to the total exclusion of party politics". The society's first annual report indicated that the society "owes its origin to a strong desire felt by its projectors to assist in promoting the progress of social improvement in the manufacturing population by which they are surrounded", the background being the conditions of working people and their families, which reflected the effects of the industrial revolution in Manchester.

=== A pioneer in social surveys ===
Some of the society's early meetings considered statistics already collected elsewhere. A major impetus to the society's work, however, came when Charles Poulett Thomson, vice-president of the Board of Trade, suggested that the society itself collect statistical information on, for example, the condition of the working people of Manchester. This led to the society achieving prominence with its innovative work of several social surveys, involving considerable effort to collect detailed data, as in the report on 4,102 families in parts of Manchester, based on house-to-house research. The work was extended to cover surrounding towns, with agents paid to visit houses and collect data, the results summarised in reports.

An important subject of the society's early enquiries was education. The reports in its first eight years included surveys of the state of education in Manchester, Bury, Salford, Liverpool, Rutland and Hull; the findings were "totally condemnatory of the situation then existing". The society's early reports on education had, according to Butterfield, helped make Manchester the most education-conscious city in England. Selleck described the society as "a pioneer in new intellectual ways".

By 1840 the society had 60 members; they included a dozen people who were significant in running the Anti-Corn Law League. The society had, by then, issued 22 reports and 51 papers. According to Abrams, the society, in its early years, did more impressive work than the Statistical Society of London.

== Development ==
The society was unable to keep up its early momentum; the 1840s saw fewer reports and declining membership. Credited with helping the society avoid dissolution was Edward Herford, a coroner, who enlisted 16 new recruits in 1846. The driving force of the society in the 1840s was John Roberton, a doctor at the Lying in Hospital in Manchester; he shared an interest in collation and interpretation of medical statistics with fellow members such as James Phillips Kay. Roberton was author of eight of the 15 papers known to have been presented to the society from its 1842-43 session to 1849–50. In total he read 27 papers to the society, on matters as diverse as the effect of climate on man, municipal government, national schools of Ireland, and evils affecting railway labourers.

Medical and related matters were important in the society's meetings; in 1875 Wilkinson found that one-third of the papers read before the society had been on sanitary and kindred matters and John Pickstone, a medical historian, says that the Manchester Statistical Society

... was associated with the resurgence of Manchester liberalism, with moves for central and local government reform and with new, regional, groupings of doctors. In their new societies the leaders of local medicine and surgery sought to show that they were scientific professionals not just tradesmen; intellectual and aware investigators, even though they were in provincial cities rather than London or Edinburgh.

The nature of the society's activities was, however, changing, with Elesh highlighting a switch from original research to secondary analyses, using statistics collected elsewhere; he concluded that the society failed to institutionalise survey research. There was also a trend toward historical essays and discussions of more general questions of political economy, such as decimal coinage.

Economics was developing as a profession, and began to be represented in the membership of the society and the papers presented. One of the new members in 1865-66 was Stanley Jevons, who had accepted a teaching post in Manchester; in 1867 he became Professor in Political Economy at Cambridge. Jevons presented a paper on the progress of the mathematical theory of political economy in 1874, though many of the society's meetings were non-technical, across a varied range of topics. Examples of subjects covered in the 1870s, both economic and non-economic, were trade unions, population statistics, the American financial crisis, the cotton trade, prison discipline and sanitary progress in Manchester.

The society continued to take opportunities to be involved in the contribution that statistics could play in public policy: in 1900 its council addressed the House of Lords in favour of a quinquennial census, and suggested changes in the classification of workers in the cotton and coal industries, which were adopted by the Registrar-General.

Membership of the society increased to over 200 in 1879 and was then never below 170 until World War I. However, when the centenary was about to be celebrated in 1933, the society faced a deficit, and a special appeal was made to members.

== The second century ==
The society continued its regular meetings, covering a range of economic and social subjects. Past presidents include two Nobel Laureates in economics, John Hicks and Arthur Lewis.

Although the society's activities were primarily of a non-technical nature, there were opportunities for groups of members interested in more technical subjects. In 1933-34 a group for the study of statistical methods began to hold meetings, it being re-formed as a group for the study of economic statistics in 1956–57. An industrial group was also formed for engineers and others interested in statistical quality control in industrial production, this series of meetings beginning in 1943–44. The society's ordinary meetings continued with a range of subjects: for example, its 1956-57 session saw discussions on the U.K. life assurance industry, economic aspects of fibre production, Soviet industrial expansion, British trade unions and the new gold standard.

The society formed an economic forecasting study group in 1970–71. Over time meetings of the society's specialist, more technical groups were arranged as joint meetings with the Royal Statistical Society and the North Western branch of the Institute of Statisticians, but meetings became infrequent in the 1980s.

In 1983 the society celebrated its sesquicentenary with a special two-day conference, held at the University of Manchester. The society's president at the time was Dame Kathleen Ollerenshaw, who was a member of the society from 1944 until her death in 2014.

The society became a registered charity (No. 1069363) in 1998.

== Current activities ==
The society continues, aiming to attract new members, without any professional qualifications being necessary. It holds regular meetings addressed by expert speakers, the focus being the discussion of social and economic affairs, examples of subjects being health, social care, policing, economic forecasting, regional economic development and inequality.

The A.H. Allman Prize was endowed in 1951 and is awarded annually to a statistics student at the University of Manchester. Allman was honorary secretary of the society for 26 years and members made a monetary presentation to him, which Allman asked to be used to establish the prize, which is administered by the University of Manchester.

The society was a beneficiary of the estate of Sir Harry Campion and the bequest was placed into a trust fund to provide occasional modest grants to support research consistent with the society's objective and history.

The society first published its Transactions in 1853, containing papers presented to the society. This, now a long-running journal, illustrates the wide range of subjects in the society's remit. The society's archives, dating back to its foundation, are kept at Manchester Central Library and the contents can be searched online.

== Officers ==
=== Presidents ===
Presidents of the Manchester Statistical Society have been:

- 1833–34 Benjamin Heywood
- 1834–36 Lt-Col. Shaw Kennedy
- 1836–37 Rev. Edward Stanley
- 1837–39 Thomas Ashton
- 1839–41 Shakespeare Phillips
- 1841–44 William Langton
- 1844–47 Dr John Roberton
- 1847–49 Samuel Robinson
- 1849–50 Henry Houldsworth
- 1850–51 William Nield
- 1851–53 Robert Needham Philips
- 1853–55 James Heywood
- 1855–57 William Metcalf
- 1857–59 Rev. C. J. Richson
- 1859–61 Dr Daniel Noble
- 1861–63 Edward Herford
- 1863–65 Dr Alfred Asplan
- 1865–67 David Chadwick
- 1867–69 William Langton
- 1869–71 William Stanley Jevons
- 1871–73 John Mills
- 1873–75 Dr John Watts
- 1875–77 Thomas Read Wilkinson
- 1877–79 Thomas Dickens
- 1879–81 Elijah Helm
- 1881–83 William Baker
- 1883–84 John Slagg
- 1884–86 Robert Montgomery
- 1886–88 Thomas B Moxon
- 1888–90 Edwin Guthrie
- 1890–92 Dr J. E. C. Munro
- 1892–94 William Fogg
- 1894–96 W. H. S. Watts
- 1896–98 George H. Pownall
- 1898–1900 Rt Rev. Dr L. C. Casartelli
- 1900–01 Prof. Alfred William Flux
- 1901–03 Sir William H. Houldsworth, Bt
- 1903–05 Frederick Merttens
- 1905–07 Frederick Brocklehurst
- 1907–09 Dr James Niven
- 1909–11 Sir S. J. Chapman, KBE
- 1911–13 Sir Drummond Fraser, KBE
- 1913–15 Theodore Gregory
- 1915–17 Barnard Ellinger
- 1917–19 Very Rev. Mgr Dr Anselm Pocock
- 1919–21 Sir Christopher T. Needham
- 1921–23 Frank Roby
- 1923–25 Prof. Henry Clay
- 1925–27 W. H. Goulty
- 1927–29 Sir William Clare Lees, OBE
- 1929–30 Sir Kenneth D. Stewart, KBE
- 1930–33 Prof. George William Daniels
- 1933–35 David Lindsay, 27th Earl of Crawford
- 1935–36 A. Linney Arnold
- 1936–38 Sir E. Raymond Streat, KBE
- 1938–40 T. S. Ashton
- 1940–42 R. C. Reynolds, OBE
- 1942–44 L .F. Behrens
- 1944–46 Sir John Hicks
- 1946–48 Sir Kenneth Lee, Bt
- 1948–50 Godfrey W. Armitage
- 1950–51 Professor Michael Polanyi
- 1951–53 Dr F. C. Toy, CBE
- 1953–55 Sir Ralph W. Lacey, KBE
- 1955–56 Prof. W. A. Lewis
- 1956–58 A. H. Allman
- 1958–59 Prof. E. Devons
- 1959–60 Prof. M. S. Bartlett
- 1960–62 L. H. C. Tippett
- 1962–63 H. E. Wadsworth
- 1963–65 R. W. Baldwin
- 1965–67 Sir Bruce Williams
- 1967–69 Sir Charles Frederick Carter
- 1969–71 Rt Hon. Lord Bowden
- 1971–73 Alfred C. Wild
- 1973–75 Prof. E. V. Morgan
- 1975–77 Arthur Duval
- 1977–79 Dr Tom J. Lunt
- 1979–81 Dr Wallis Taylor
- 1981–83 Dame Kathleen Ollerenshaw
- 1983–85 Richard Harrington
- 1985–87 Alan Roughley
- 1987–89 Prof. M. J. Artis
- 1989–91 John D. Ilett
- 1991–93 Prof. J. Stanley Metcalfe, CBE
- 1993–95 Dr Keith Julian
- 1995–97 Prof. Brian Robson, OBE
- 1997–99 David Buckley
- 1999–2001 Jonathan Aylen
- 2001–03 Paul K. Berry
- 2003–05 Prof. Luke Georghiou
- 2005–07 Brenda E. Ilett
- 2007–09 John Acaster
- 2009–11 Dr Stuart Thompson
- 2011–13 Dr Philip Lund
- 2013–15 Dennis Carter
- 2015–17 Dr John Rigby
- 2017–19 Rt Rev. Dr David Walker
- 2019–21 Dr Fred Wheeler
- 2021–23 Prof. Philip Morgan
- 2023–25 Philip Hulme
- 2025– Guy Marshall

== See also ==
- List of societies for education in Manchester

== Citations ==
Abrams, Philip (1968). The Origins of British Sociology: 1834-1914. London: The University of Chicago Press. ISBN 0-226-00171-7.

Ashton, Thomas S. (1977) [1934]. Economic and Social Investigations in Manchester, 1833-1933. London: Harvester Press. ISBN 0-85527-025-X.

Bevis, James (2011). "Kay, Heywood and Langton". Transactions of the Manchester Statistical Society, 2010-11.

Butterfield, P.H. (1974). "The educational researches of the Manchester Statistical Society, 1830-1840". British Journal of Educational Studies. 22 (3): 340–359. doi:10.1080/00071005.1974.9973419.

Cullen, Michael J. (1975). The Statistical Movement in Early Victorian Britain. Hassocks, Sussex: Harvester Press. ISBN 0-901759-17-1.

Elesh, David (1972). "The Manchester Statistical Society: A case study of a discontinuity in the history of empirical social research (Part I)". Journal of the History of the Behavioral Sciences. 8 (3): 280–301. doi:10.1002/1520-6696(197207)8:3<280::AID-JHBS2300080303>3.0.CO;2-S.

Kay, James P. (1970) [1832]. The Moral and Physical Condition of the Working Classes employed in the cotton manufacture in Manchester (2nd ed.). New York: A. M. Kelly. ISBN 978-0-678-05107-8.

Sesquicentennial conference, 14-15 April 1983, Proceedings and Papers. Manchester Statistical Society. 1983.

O'Brien, Christopher (January 2011). "The origins and originators of early statistical societies: a comparison of Liverpool and Manchester". Journal of the Royal Statistical Society. Series A (Statistics in Society). 174 (1). Wiley: 51–62. doi:10.1111/j.1467-985X.2010.00649.x. S2CID 119003801.

O'Brien, Christopher (2012). "The Manchester Statistical Society: civic engagement in the 19th century". Transactions of the Manchester Statistical Society, 2011-12.

O'Brien, Christopher (2017). "The Manchester Statistical Society: the contribution of females pre-1945". Transactions of the Manchester Statistical Society, 2015-16.

Pickstone, J (1987). "Manchester's history and Manchester's medicine". Br Med J (Clin Res Ed). 295: 1604–8. doi:10.1136/bmj.295.6613.1604. PMC 1257489. PMID 3121091.

Pickering, Paul; Tyrell, Alex (2000). The People's Bread: A History of the Anti-Corn Law League. Bloomsbury Publishing. ISBN 978-0-56720-497-4.

Selleck, Richard W. (1989). "The Manchester Statistical Society and the foundation of social science research". Australian Educational Researcher. 16 (1): 1–14. doi:10.1007/BF03219431. S2CID 147193983.

Selleck, Richard W. (1994). James Kay-Shuttleworth. Journey of an Outsider. Ilford: Woburn Press. ISBN 0-7130-0187-9.

Wilkinson, Thomas R. (1876). "On the origin and history of the Manchester Statistical Society". Transactions of the Manchester Statistical Society, 1875-76.

Willcox, Walter F. (1934). "Note on the chronology of statistical societies". Journal of the American Statistical Association. 29 (188): 418–420. doi:10.1080/01621459.1934.10503258.
