= Hugh Birley =

British businessman and politician (1817–1883)

The Honourable Hugh Birley
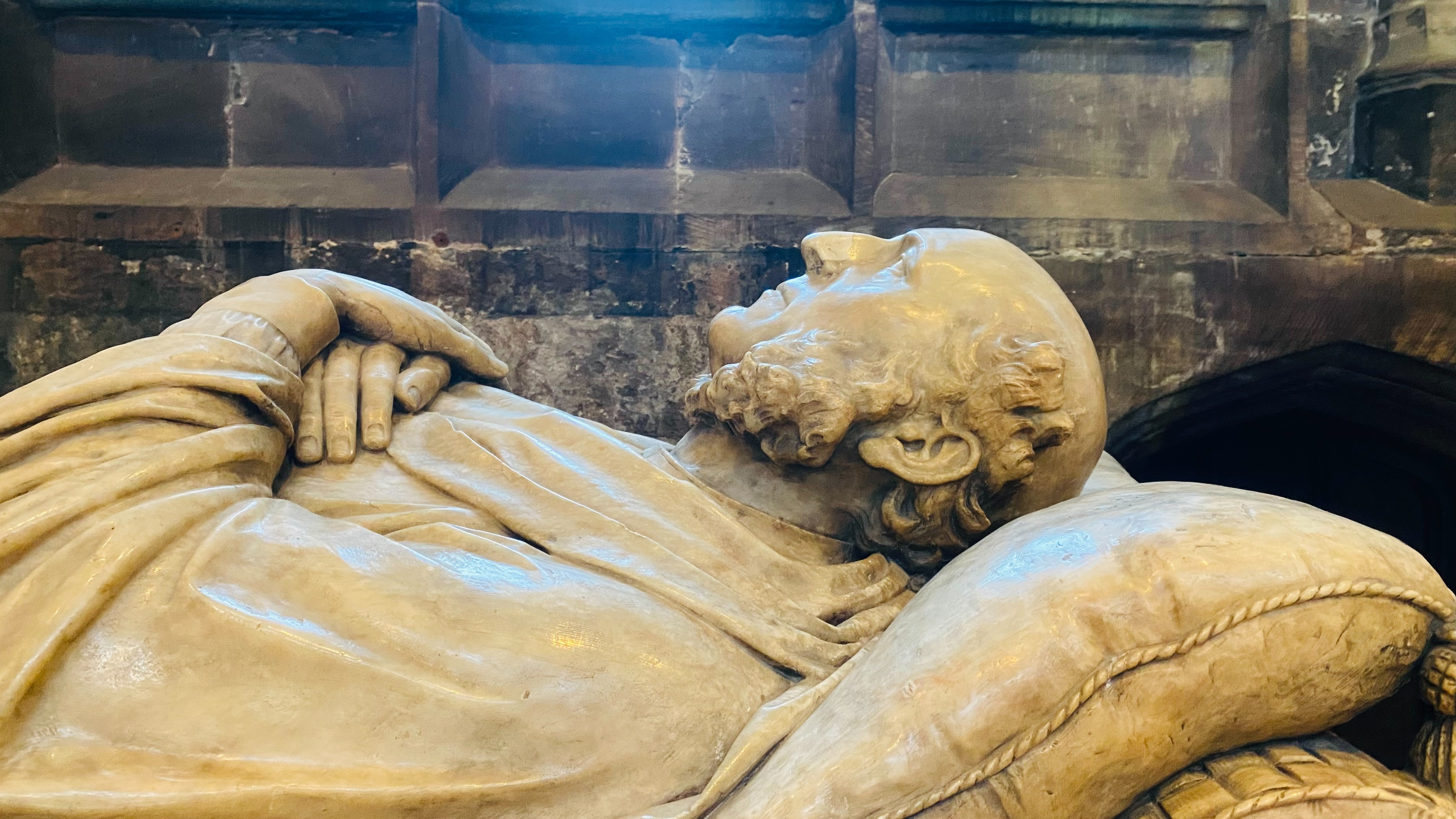
- Birley's effigy in Manchester Cathedral

Member of Parliament for Manchester
- In office 3 December 1868 – 17 February 1874
- Prime Minister: William Gladstone

Member of Parliament for Manchester
- In office 20 February 1874 – 21 April 1880
- Prime Minister: Benjamin Disraeli

Member of Parliament for Manchester
- In office 23 April 1880 – 7 September 1883 (died in office)
- Prime Minister: William Gladstone
- Succeeded by: William Houldsworth

Personal details
- Born: 21 October 1817 Blackburn, Lancashire, United Kingdom
- Died: 7 September 1883 (aged 65)
- Party: Conservative
- Spouse: Mabella Baxendale
- Children: 4
- Education: Winchester School

Hugh Birley (21 October 1817 – 7 September 1883) was a British businessman and Conservative politician.

== Life ==
Birley was born in Blackburn, Lancashire, the third son of Joseph Birley of Ford Bank, Manchester. Following education at Winchester School, he went to India, where he was the head of Birley, Corrie and Company, East India merchants. On his return to England he became a partner in Birley and Company, cotton spinners and also in Charles Macintosh and Company, manufacturers of India rubber goods.

He was appointed a justice of the peace and Deputy Lieutenant for the County Palatine of Lancaster. He was an active supporter of the Church of England, and assisted in the building of a number of Anglican churches and schools in the Manchester area.

Birley was granted armorial bearings by the College of Arms, the blazon of which was as follows: Sable on a fesse engrailed between three boars' heads couped argent, a mascle between three cross crosslets of the field, and for the Crest upon a wreath of the colours a demi-boar rampant sable collared argent the chain reflexed over the back or supporting a branch of wild teazle proper, charged on the shoulder with a millrind argent.

== Parliamentary career ==
At the 1868 general election the representation of the Parliamentary Borough of Manchester was increased to three members of parliament. Birley was elected as the first Conservative MP for the town, alongside the two sitting Liberal Party members, Thomas Bazley and Jacob Bright. He retained his seat at the ensuing elections of 1874 and 1880.

== Later years and death ==
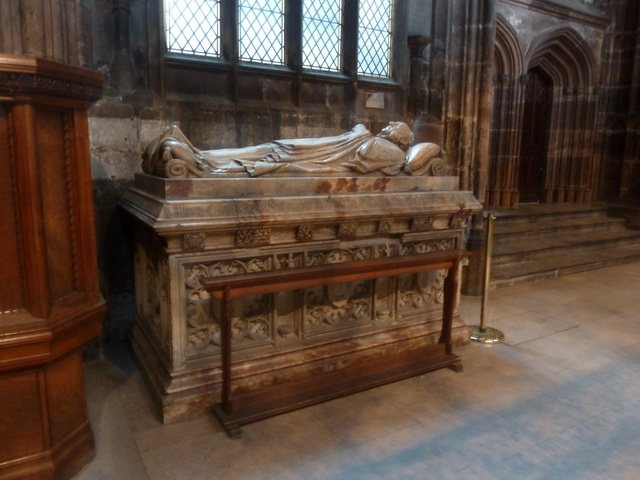
Tomb of Hugh Birley in Manchester Cathedral

For the final years of his life, Birley was in poor health, and travelled to South Africa and Cannes in the south of France in an attempt to recuperate. However, after May 1883 he was too ill to attend parliament. He died at his Didsbury home in September 1883, aged 66.

Birley was buried in Manchester Cathedral. He was remembered for his generous support for the Church of England, financing new local churches and schools, and funds were raised for his memorial in the Cathedral, an ornate Gothic Revival altar tomb of polished Caen stone surmounted with a life-sized alabaster recumbent effigy of Birley, which was designed by J. S. Crowther.

== Family ==
He married Mabella Baxendale in 1842, and they had two sons and two daughters. They made their home at "Moorland", Didsbury, near Manchester.

Hugh Birley was a nephew of the industrialist Hugh Hornby Birley (1778–1845), noted for his role in the Peterloo Massacre of 1819. Hugh Birley was the great-uncle of Robert Birley, who was Head Master of Eton College from 1949 to 1963.

Parliament of the United Kingdom
Preceded by Thomas Bazley; Jacob Bright	Member of Parliament for Manchester; 1868–1883; With: Thomas Bazley 1868–1880; Jacob Bright 1868–1874, 1876–1883; William Romaine Callender 1874–1876; John Slagg 1880–1883	Succeeded by Jacob Bright; William Henry Houldsworth; John Slagg
