= AGEUS Award for Individual Contribution =

Award at the Annual Georgia European Union Summit

The AGEUS Award for Individual Contribution began in 2006. It is presented annually during the meeting of the Annual Georgia European Union Summit, and goes to an individual who has shown exceptional success and dedication in fostering foreign economic development in the State of Georgia, US.

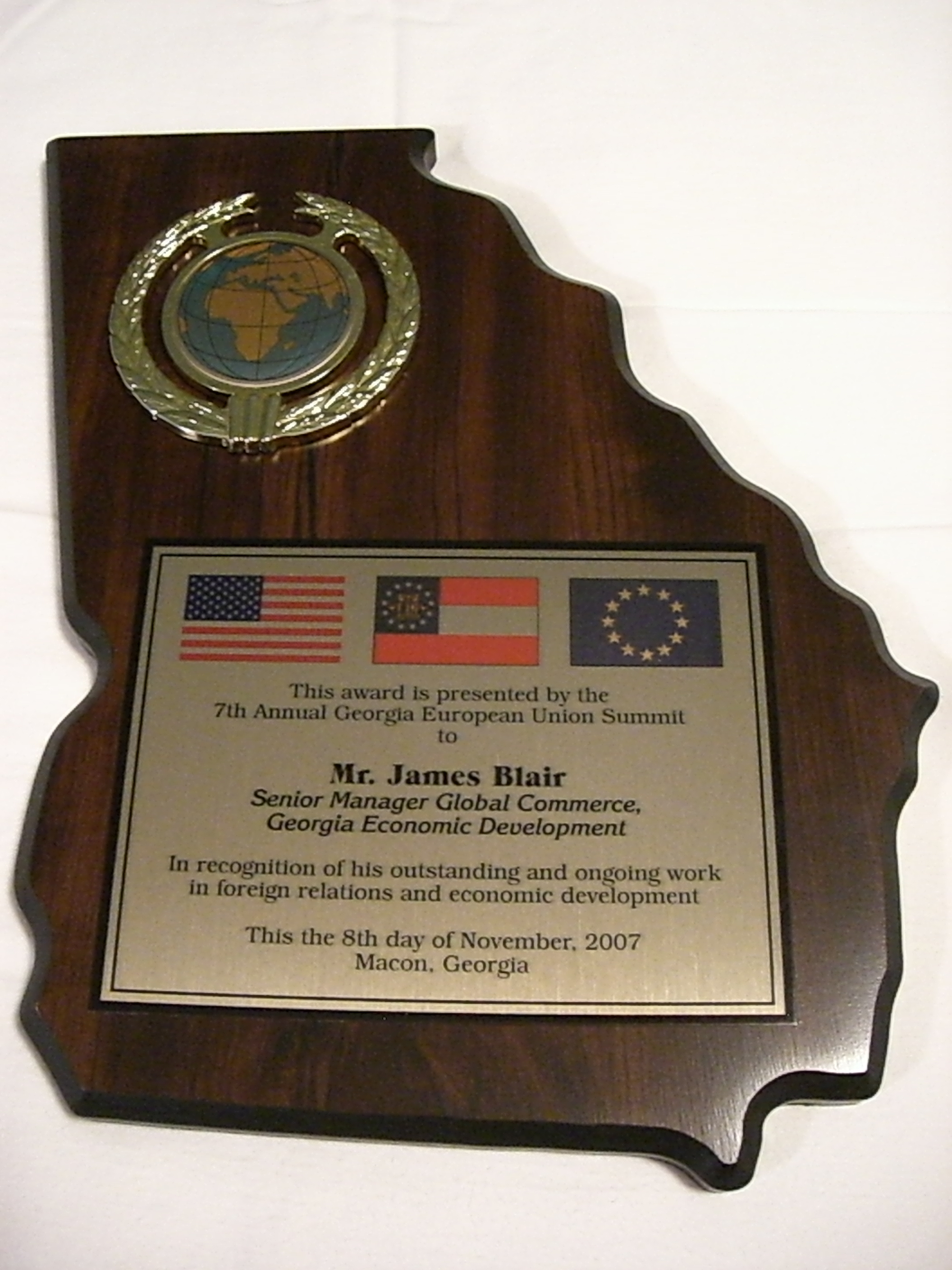
AGEUS International Award 2007

== Prior AGEUS Award winners ==
- 2006: Christopher N. Smith, Honorary Consul of the Kingdom of Denmark to Georgia, for his work bringing Danish companies to Georgia.
- 2007: James Blair of the Georgia Department of Economic Development for his 19 years of ongoing work in Europe on behalf of Georgia business.
- 2008: Not awarded
- 2009: Dr. Bruce S. Allen for his work in foreign relations and economic development.
- 2010: Not awarded

== See also ==
- List of economics awards
