= Young Economist of the Year =

Award granted by the Royal Economic Society and Financial Times

Young Economist of the Year is an academic award first granted in 2007 to individuals that won the annual competition of the same name hosted by the Royal Economic Society (RES) in association with the Financial Times (FT). High school students around the world taking A-level and equivalent economics courses are eligible to submit a 1500-word short research paper on one of the economics topics announced annually by the host to participate in the competition.

In the 2019 competition, 1300 submissions were received and 36 best entries were shortlisted by the judging panel (yielding a selective 2.7% acceptance rate). Among those, one best overall essay was awarded £1,000 while the best essays on each topic received £200. All finalists won a high commendation from the judging panel of the Royal Economic Society while other submissions of "great work and originality" are also included in a commended list. Authors of all the shortlisted essays are colloquially regarded as "Winners of the Young Economist of the Year" and have their names and school affiliations published on the Royal Economic Society's website.

Since 2023, the competition has been sponsored by the Big Four accounting firm KPMG.

== See also ==
- List of economics awards
- Royal Economic Society
- Financial Times
