= Lilly Maxwell =

British suffragist

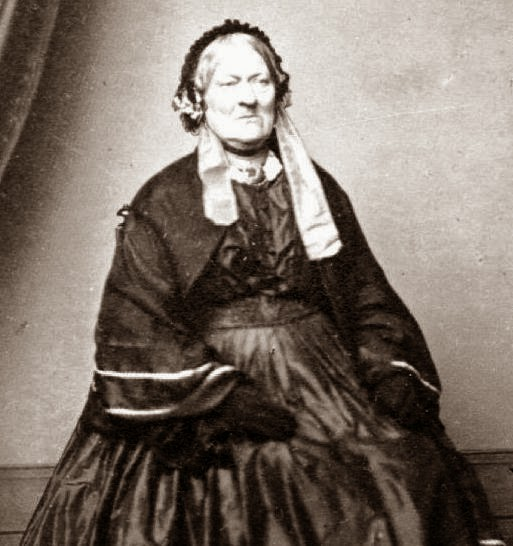
- c.1867
- Born: c.1800 Scotland
- Died: October 1876; Withington, Manchester, England
- Known for: early female voter

Lilly Maxwell or Lily Maxwell (c.1800 – October 1876) was a British suffragist who, in 1867, was the first woman known to have voted at a parliamentary contest since the Reform Act 1832 had limited the franchise to ‘male persons’. This resulted in an important test case in the Court of Common Pleas.

== Life ==
Maxwell was born around the year 1800 in Scotland, and had originally worked in domestic service before setting up a shop selling crockery. She rented a shop and house at 25 Ludlow Street, Chorlton-upon-Medlock, Manchester which were of high enough monetary value to qualify their occupier under the pre-1867 £10 household borough franchise. Consequently, her name appeared on the list of voters for Manchester in error as her name, Lilly, was mistaken for that of a man. Her accidental inclusion on the list was discovered by one of the candidates for election, Jacob Bright, a supporter of women's suffrage. Alongside his wife, Ursula Mellor Bright, he was a founder of the Manchester branch of the National Society for Women’s Suffrage, in January 1867. Bright’s election committee alerted Lydia Becker, the society’s secretary, to Maxwell's appearance on the list, and she informed Maxwell of the situation.

Maxwell was not the first woman to vote but in this case she was encouraged by Lydia Becker to be a test case. Records show that women had voted in Britain including maybe thirty in Lichfield in 1843. These were women who owned property and led households like Maxwell. Maxwell ran a shop that sold a range of goods from crockery to red herring. In fact she was a citizen in her own right as she had been fined a pound by the Police Court for selling short measures at her shop in the Manchester suburb of Chorlton-on-Medlock.

On 26 November 1867, she became the first woman known to have voted at a parliamentary contest since the 1832 Reform Act had specifically limited the franchise to 'male persons'. The returning officer allowed Maxwell to vote at Chorlton Town Hall in a by-election. Maxwell cast her vote for Jacob Bright who supported the suffragist cause. At this time, votes had to be spoken out loud and Punch magazine marked this with a ditty: "To the fair Lily Maxwell a bumper, Who in petticoats rushed to the poll, And for Jacob Bright entered her plumper, Mill’s first ‘person’, singular, sole!" Bright mentioned Maxwell’s vote in his victory speech, describing her as ‘a hardworking honest person, who pays her rates as you do’.

Becker subsequently encouraged 5,346 other female heads of households to apply for their names to appear on the electoral rolls. These claims were presented at the Court of Common Pleas by Sir John Coleridge and Richard Pankhurst in Chorlton v. Lings on 2 November 1868. The law was not clear as the relevant legislation did not include the word "male" but instead used the ambiguous term "man". The case ruled that women could not vote in British elections.

Maxwell died in October 1876 having been obliged to enter Withington workhouse as she had no other means of support.
