= H. C. Recktenwald Prize in Economics =

The H. C. Recktenwald Prize in Economics was awarded to several academic economists from 1995 to 2004. It is named for Prof. Horst Claus Recktenwald, a German economist, and was endowed by his wife, Hertha Recktenwald, after his death.

The committee to select the prize recipients is nominated by the President of Friedrich-Alexander-University in Erlangen-Nuremberg, Germany.

== Prize recipients ==
- 1995: Edmond Malinvaud
- 1997: Joseph E. Stiglitz
- 2000: Paul Krugman
- 2002: Paul Romer
- 2004: Oliver E. Williamson
- 2014: Emmanuel Saez

== See also ==
- List of economics awards
