= Pioneers of Prosperity =

International awards program

Pioneers of Prosperity is an awards programme for entrepreneurs in Africa, the Caribbean and Central America that have created wealth and invested in their society. Its aim is to recognise and support today's successful enterprises and inspire the next generation of entrepreneurs, leading to stronger, more sustainable development in these regions. Winning companies receive up to $100,000 to invest in their business.

The first awards ceremony took place in 2007 in Kigali, Rwanda. The second African award ceremony took place in Kigali, Rwanda on November 19, 2008, and awards will be held in the Caribbean and Central America in early 2009.

== Objectives ==
The stated objective of Pioneers of Prosperity is "to foster greater prosperity in developing countries by influencing the assumptions and behaviors of entrepreneurs, policymakers, academics and business leaders". The program highlights successful models of enterprise-based development, thereby creating a stronger culture of innovation and entrepreneurship. Specifically, the program aims to do the following:
1 - Identify competitive small and medium-size companies that are developing promising business models;
2 - Invest in these firms through award prize money;
3 - Diffuse the ideas, attitudes, and practices that set these firms apart from their peers so they may serve as role models to aspiring entrepreneurs in the region; and
4 - Focus international organizations on the private sector as a means for economic development.

== Africa Awards ==
In 2007, the inaugural Legatum Pioneers of Prosperity Africa Awards launched in five African Great Lakes countries. More than 450 firms competed from which five winners and one grand prize winner were selected. The winners received their awards in Kigali, Rwanda from President Paul Kagame of Rwanda on November 30, 2007.

The grand prize winner was Kenyan firm AAA Growers, which provides fresh-cut vegetables to the UK market; additional winners included Kencall, Enterprise Urwibutso, Virtual City Limited, Good African Coffee, and Tele-10.

The 2007 program was captured in a documentary 'Unlocking Africa' made by award-winning filmmaker Jeff Zimbalist.

In 2008, the Legatum Pioneers of Prosperity Awards (Africa) expanded to 10 countries across Africa and received almost 1,500 applications from small and medium-sized enterprises in Botswana, Cameroon, Côte d'Ivoire, Ghana, Kenya, Namibia, Nigeria, Rwanda, South Africa and Uganda. On November 19, 2008, the second Legatum Pioneers of Prosperity Africa Grand Prize was awarded to Superflux International, a security printing solutions company in Nigeria; other prizes were awarded to firms from Kenya, Rwanda, South Africa and Uganda. The presentation ceremony was attended by Paul Kagame, President of the Republic of Rwanda, and the guest of honour, Mwai Kibaki, President of the Republic of Kenya, who awarded the Grand Prize.

The cash prizes for the Africa awards totaled US$350k and the winners were selected by a jury process from a pool of applicants evaluated according to the COW-F framework.

== Caribbean and Central America Awards ==
In February 2009, the Pioneers of Prosperity Awards launched Caribbean and American countries, including Bahamas, Barbados, Belize, Guyana, Haiti, Jamaica, Trinidad and Tobago, Costa Rica, the Dominican Republic, El Salvador, Guatemala, Honduras, Nicaragua and Panama.

The competition is open to all private sector small and medium enterprises (SMEs) based in the participating countries that have between 5 and 250 employees and annual revenues of US$100,000 and $5,000,000. The prizes for the Caribbean awards will total to $600,000, including a $100,000 grand prize winner and several smaller prizes ranging from $5,000 to $50,000. Just under 600 firms applied for the competition, which closed on March 23, 2009. The winners will be selected by a jury process from a pool of applicants evaluated according to the COW-F framework, and the prizes awarded in June 2009.

== Theoretical background ==
The Pioneers of Prosperity program uses the COW-F framework, conceived of by development expert and author Michael Fairbanks, to identify promising business models. The COW-F framework asserts that a good business model provides a unique value proposition to all of its stakeholders: Customers, Owners, Workers, and Future generations.

Customers receive a product they value at a competitive price; Owners receive an above average return for their investment; Workers receive a high and rising standard of living; and all of this is achieved without eroding the social or environment fabric for future generations, and ideally while investing in the broader public good.

According to Fairbanks, COW-F firms understand the correlation between satisfied employees and a successful business. Satisfied employees take pride in their place of work, have higher degrees of loyalty to their employer and have a vested interest in seeing the company succeed. The assumption is that by investing in their employees, through both rising wages and employee training, employers find themselves with happier employees that are more productive. Highly productive employees are a critical component of a successful business.

The 'Pioneers of Prosperity' program identifies and rewards outstanding emerging market COW-F entrepreneurs. By publicizing their stories and rewarding their efforts, it is hoped that the benefits of the COW-F model can be disseminated across the developing world. As a condition of the grant, the winners use award proceeds for improvement of the skills and capabilities necessary to further enhance the COW-F model for their workers. The training may focus on both management and technical skills, including: financial management, market research techniques, product design, sales, and customer service.

== Funders ==
Pioneers of Prosperity is funded by the multilateral development agency Inter-American Development Bank, the private equity firm Legatum, the John Templeton Foundation and the philanthropy Social Equity Venture Fund (SEVEN). It is implemented by the OTF Group, an international economic development consulting firm.

== See also ==
- List of economics awards
