= Thomas Edward Thorpe =

British chemist (1845–1925)

Thomas Edward Thorpe CB FRS FRSE
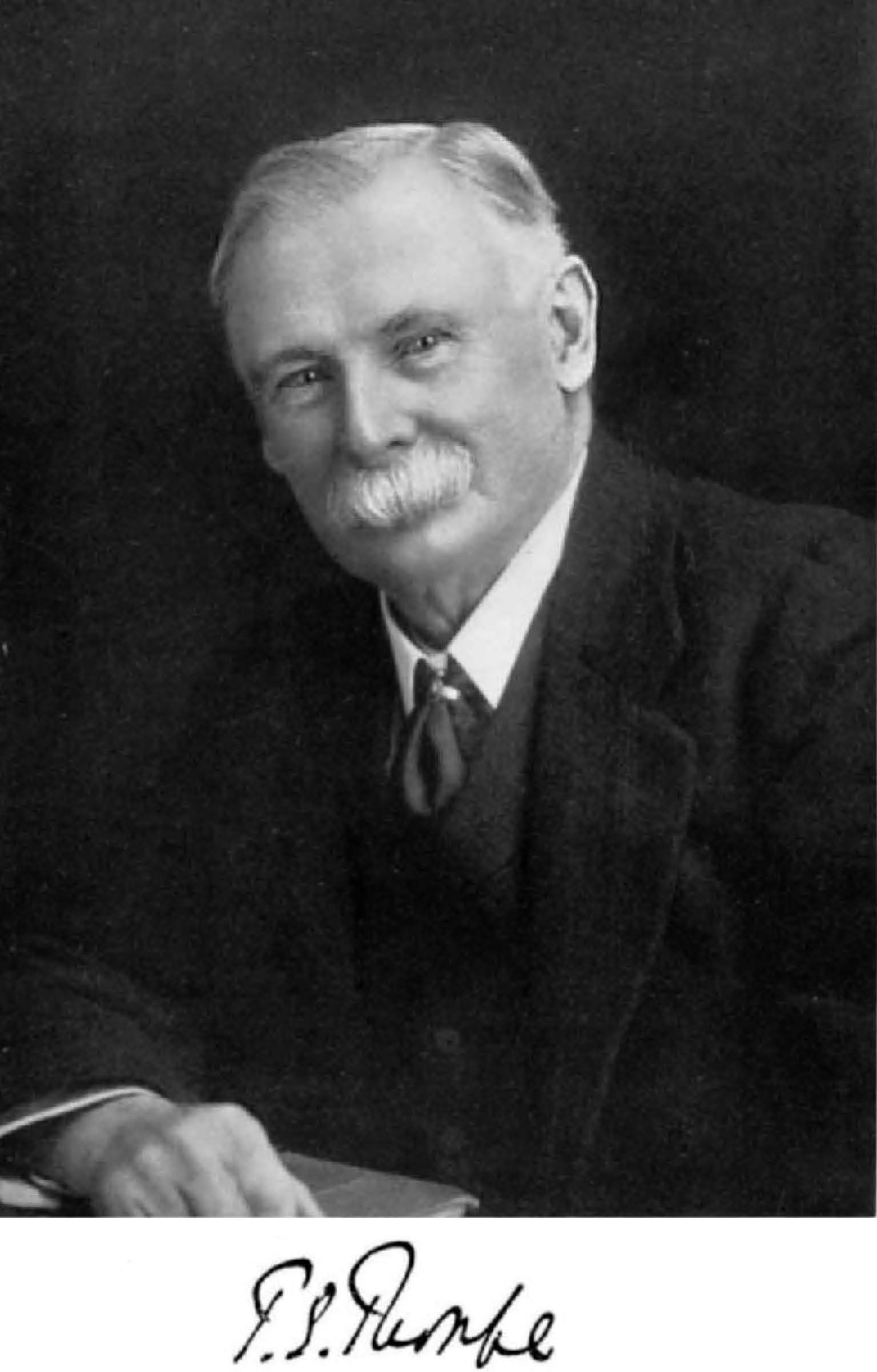
- Born: 8 December 1845; Manchester, UK
- Died: 23 February 1925 (aged 79); Salcombe, UK
- Education: University of Heidelberg
- Awards: Longstaff Prize (1881); Royal Medal (1889)
- Scientific career
- Fields: Chemistry
- Workplaces: Normal School of Science; Yorkshire College of Science; Andersonian Institute
- Doctoral advisor: Robert Bunsen
- Doctoral students: Henry Vincent Arid Briscoe

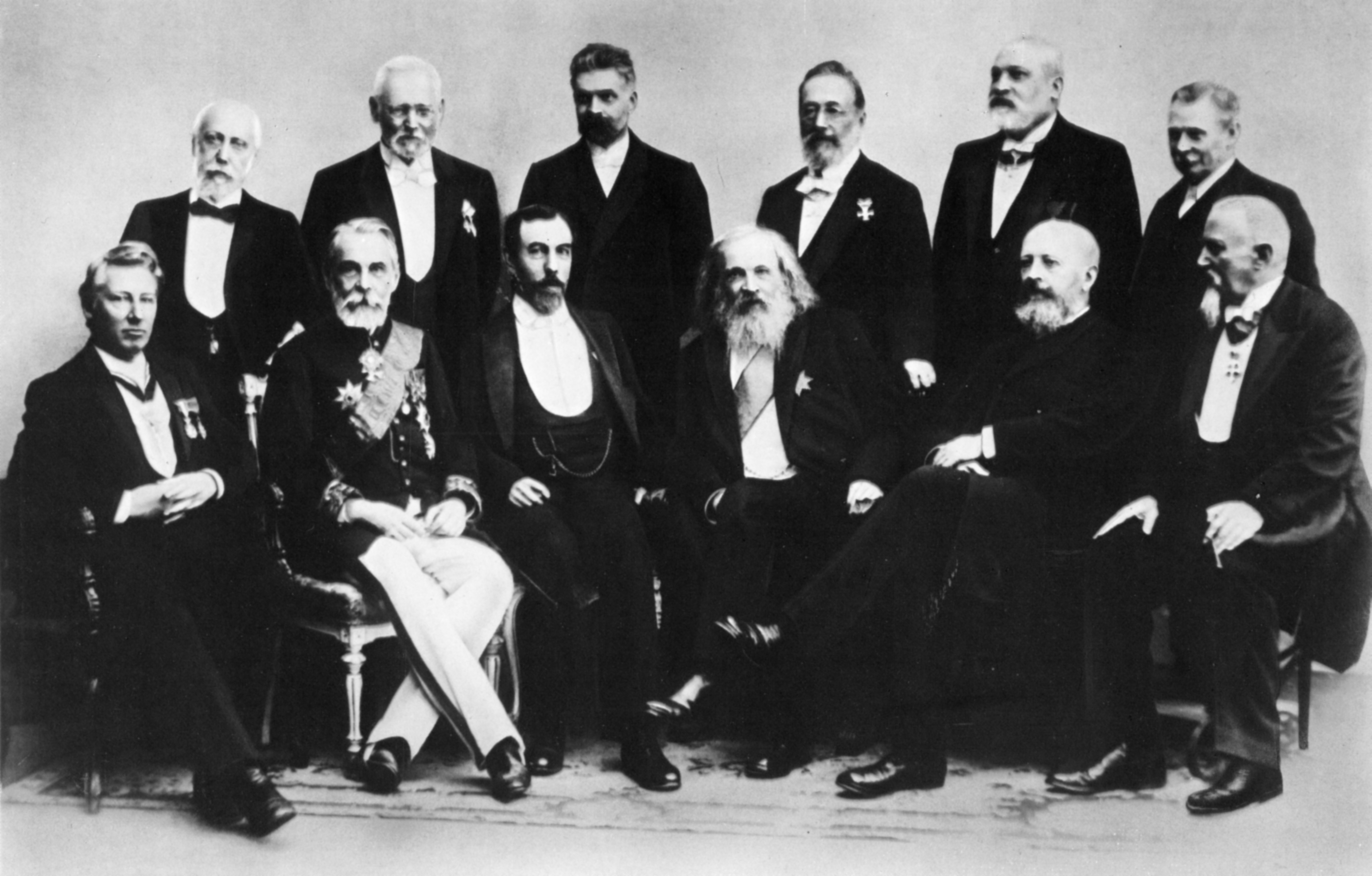
Thomas Thorpe (top row, right), Dmitri Mendeleev, Alfred Werner and other prominent chemists

Sir Thomas Edward Thorpe CB, FRS HFRSE LLD (8 December 1845 – 23 February 1925) was a British chemist. From 1894 to 1909, he was Chief Chemist to the British Government, as Director of the Government Laboratory.

== Early life and education ==
Thorpe was born at Barnes Green in Harpurhey, Manchester, the son of George Thorpe, a cotton merchant at Trafford Bank, and his wife Mary Wilde. He was educated at Hulme Grammar School.

Thorpe originally worked as a clerk, but in 1863 began working as an assistant to Henry Roscoe, a professor of chemistry at Owen's College, Manchester, where he gained a degree in Chemistry. Thorpe then undertook postgraduate studies at the University of Heidelberg, gaining his doctorate (PhD).

== Academic career ==
After a time working for August Kekulé in Bonn Thorpe returned to Britain in 1870 to accept a Chair at the Andersonian Institute (now the University of Strathclyde) in Glasgow. He later held posts at the Yorkshire College of Science (now the University of Leeds) and the Normal School of Science (later the Royal College of Science and now part of Imperial College London).

Thorpe conducted research on a wide range of subjects. He contributed to the understanding of the relationship between substances' molecular weights and their specific gravities, and his work on phosphorus compounds led to a better understanding of phosphorus trioxide and the prevention of the illnesses it caused to workers in the match industry. Thorpe's work on the atomic weights of metals led to the award of a Royal Medal in 1889, and in 1902 Thorpe was elected member of the newly created International Atomic Weights Commission. He was a fellow of the Royal Society, to which he served as foreign secretary in 1903. He was the president of the British Association for 1921–1922. He also took part in four eclipse expeditions, and a magnetic survey of the British Isles.

From 1894 to 1895, Thorpe served as president of the Society of Chemical Industry. He left academia in 1894 to take up a government post as principal of Somerset House Laboratory, also known as the Government Laboratory, originally established in 1842 for the prevention of the adulteration of tobacco products and then enhanced by the Sale of Food and Drugs Act 1875 (38 & 39 Vict. c. 63). In this post from 1894 to 1909, he moved the government laboratory in 1897 from Somerset House to a new building of his own design and helped to further the effectiveness and reputation of this government laboratory. With his staff Thorpe worked on matters of public health, including the detection of arsenic in beer, and the elimination of lead from pottery. His successor as principal chemist of the Government Laboratories was James Johnston Dobbie. In 1912 he was appointed to the Royal Commission on Fuel and Engines.

== Honours ==
Thorpe was elected to honorary membership of the Manchester Literary and Philosophical Society on 17 April 1894, appointed a Companion of the Order of the Bath (CB) by Queen Victoria in the 1900 Birthday Honours and knighted by King Edward VII in 1909.

== Family ==
In 1870, Thorpe married Caroline Emma Watts, daughter of John Watts. They had no children.

== Death ==
Thorpe died of a heart attack, following a long period of ill-health, at "Whinfield" in Salcombe, Devon on 23 February 1925 at the age of 79. He was buried in the local churchyard at Salcombe.

== Publications ==
- Thorpe wrote a number of books, including the textbooks Inorganic Chemistry (1873), Dictionary of Applied Chemistry (1890) and a History of Chemistry (vol. 1, 1909; vol. 2, 1910). Outside chemistry, his great interest was yachting, and he wrote two books on this subject; A Yachtsman's Guide to the Dutch Waterways (1905) and The Seine from Havre to Paris (1913).
