= Governor's Award (Albania) =

Albanian award

The Governor's Award (Albanian: Çmimi i Guvernatorit) in Albania is an annual award given by the Governor of the Bank of Albania to Albanian students worldwide who have developed the best diploma theses at the completion of their undergraduate studies for finance-related research.

== History ==
The undergraduate dissertations should be of high scientific standards and should concern crucial issues related to the Bank of Albania (the sole monetary authority in the country) as well as issues related to the macroeconomic and financial frames of the state. The ceremony is held every year during the conference proceedings of the Bank of Albania.

The first ceremony was held on October 31, 2006. A scientific committee of Albanian and foreign representatives evaluated more than thirty dissertations submitted by Albanian students from all over the world and three prizes were awarded to the following students: the First Prize (Gold Medal) to Gizelda Emini, a finance graduate of the University of Tirana, the Second Prize (Silver Medal) to Arber Borici, a computer science and economics graduate of the University of New York, Tirana, and the Third Prize (Bronze Medal) to Lorena Gega, a finance graduate of the University of Tirana. The then Governor of the Bank of Albania, Ardian Fullani, emphasised that the award would encourage prospective students to develop advanced dissertations along with undergraduate research in public and private universities in Albania.

== Description ==
In 2020 the annual award, given by the Governor of the Bank of Albania Gent Sejkoto, was described as an award for Albanian students worldwide who have developed the best diploma theses at the completion of their undergraduate studies, for "research related to monetary and international economics, financial stability, economic integration issues of Balkan countries in the European Union, monetary policy and macro-prudential policies of the Bank of Albania, fiscal policy and their role in economy, the Albanian banking system, and overall economy aspects".

== See also ==
- List of general science and technology awards
- List of economics awards
- Civil awards and decorations of Albania
- University of New York, Tirana
- University of Tirana
