= John Watts (reformer) =

English educational and social reformer (1818–1887)

John Watts (1818–1887) was an English educational and social reformer. Originally an Owenite, whose economic writings affected the views of Friedrich Engels, he moved to a position more in favour of capital. In later life he had a multiplicity of interests and undertook many social projects.

== Early life ==
The son of James Watts, a ribbon weaver, he was born at Coventry, Warwickshire, on 24 March 1818. At five years of age he suffered partial paralysis of his left side, and could not take a manual job. After leaving elementary school, he became a member of the local Mechanics' Institution, where from age of 13 to 20 he acted as assistant secretary and librarian. He then went into trade, but adopted communist principles, and became a lecturer on Robert Owen's views. He visited many towns, and in Scotland attended lectures at the Andersonian University.

In July 1841 Watts moved to Manchester. For three years he ran a boys' school in the Manchester Hall of Science, an Owenite foundation designed to hold 3000 people. He held public discussions in the district on Owen's system of society. It was at this period that Engels had contact with Watts as a lecturer.

== After Owen ==
In 1844 Watts had come to the conclusion that Owen's ideal community was impracticable, and many of its adherents self-seeking; and he went into business again. On 18 July 1844 he obtained from the University of Giessen the degree of PhD In 1846 he was named by the Northern Star, the radical Chartist paper, as one of a small number of Owenites sympathetic to the aims of their movement, with George Holyoake and G. A. Fleming.

In 1853 Watts was a promoter of the People's Provident Assurance Society, and went to London, returning in 1857 to be local manager in Manchester. This company was later known as the "European". By merging with unsound companies, it came to a disastrous end. Subsequently Watts wrote the first draft of a bill which was introduced into Parliament and became the Life Assurance Companies Act 1870 (33 & 34 Vict. c. 61), which among other precautionary measures forbade the transfer or amalgamation of insurance companies without judicial authority.

=== Committee man ===
In 1845 Watts took part in a movement which led to the establishment of three public parks in Manchester and Salford. In 1847 he joined, and later was the leading advocate of, the Lancashire Public School Association, which became called the National Public School Association. It pushed for the provision of free, secular, and rate-supported schools, and had Samuel Lucas as chairman. He also joined the society for promoting the repeal of the "taxes on knowledge", and supported the efforts in Parliament of Milner Gibson, Richard Cobden, and Ayrton, framing many questions, and collecting most of the specimen cases, brought up with the chancellor of the exchequer.

In 1850 Watts persuaded Sir John Potter, then mayor of Manchester, to form a committee for the establishment of a free library under the provisions of Public Libraries Act 1850, which was then passing through Parliament, insisting that it should he a free lending library. Watts acted as one of the secretaries of the committee that saw the Manchester Free Library opened by public subscription. The Education Aid Society of Manchester received support from him, as did also the educational section of the Social Science Congress of 1866. As a result of that conference a special committee was appointed, on whose behalf he prepared the draft of Henry Austin Bruce's education bill of 1868. He was a member of the Manchester school board from its constitution in 1870 to his death, and secretary to the Owens College extension committee, which raised funds for new building and endowment.

Watts was closely associated with the co-operative movement. For a time he was a major contributor to the Co-operative News. His advice was often sought in trade disputes.

Watts was also chairman of the councils of the Union of Lancashire and Cheshire Institutes, the Manchester Technical School, the Royal Botanical and Horticultural Society of Manchester, and the local provident dispensaries (which were founded on his suggestion, and with his support). He was secretary of the Manchester Reform Club, a governor of Manchester grammar school, and president of the Manchester Statistical Society, and sat on the committees of other public institutions. During the Lancashire Cotton Famine he sat as a member of the central relief committee.

== Death ==
Watts died at Old Trafford, Manchester, on 7 February 1887, and was buried in the parish church of Bowdon, Cheshire. He was elected to membership of the Manchester Literary and Philosophical Society where his obituary is available in the Memoirs and proceedings of the Society

== Works ==
Watts published:

- Facts and Fictions of Political Economists (1842), under the influence of Thomas Hodgskin, William Thompson, and John Francis Bray; considered an influence on the Umrisse zu einer Kritik der Nationalökonomie (1844) of Engels, which argues similarly in Young Hegelian terms. The work was mentioned positively in The German Ideology.
- The Facts of the Cotton Famine (1866);
- The Catechism of Wages and Capital (1867).

Also a large number of pamphlets, mainly on subjects such as trade-unions, strikes, co-operation, and education. He was a contributor to periodicals, and a newspaper correspondent, especially on educational and economic subjects.

== Family ==
Watts married Catherine Shaw in October 1844, and left four children, three having died in his lifetime. His eldest son was W. H. S. Watts, district registrar in Manchester of the high court of justice. His daughter, Caroline Emma, married Thomas Edward Thorpe, chief government analyst.

== Notes ==
Attribution

- This article incorporates text from a publication now in the public domain: Lee, Sidney, ed. (1899). "Watts, John (1818-1887)". Dictionary of National Biography. Vol. 60. London: Smith, Elder & Co.

Professional and academic associations
| Preceded by John Mills | President of the Manchester Statistical Society; 1873–75 | Succeeded by Thomas Read Wilkinson |
