= Sucker 4 Green =

2023 song by Lil Tay

Single by Lil Tay
- Released: September 30, 2023
- Genre: Dance-pop
- Length: 3:34
- Label: Create Music Group
- Songwriters: Tay Tian; Jason Tian
- Producer: Jason Tian

Lil Tay singles chronology
"Sucker 4 Green" (2023)	"Growing Up" (2024)

Music video
- "Sucker 4 Green" on YouTube

"Sucker 4 Green" (Note: The song was briefly renamed to "Sucker 4 Green (Money)" on streaming platforms. In the music video, the title is stylized as "$UCKER 4 GR€€N".) is the debut single by American-born Canadian social media personality Lil Tay. It was released independently on September 30, 2023. The music video for the song also marked her comeback to the internet after her 5-year-long hiatus and death hoax.

== Background and composition ==
Lil Tay rose to fame at the age of 10 (while claiming she was nine) in 2018 for being the self-proclaimed "youngest flexer of the century" as well as posting rap videos on YouTube. In June 2018, Tay's Instagram and YouTube content were wiped out in an attempt to rebrand. Since then until the release of this single, Tay had disappeared from social media. In August 2023, it was announced that Lil Tay and her half-brother, Jason Tian, had supposedly died. A day after the announcement, it was reported that Tay's Instagram account was hacked and that none of them died.

On September 28, 2023, Tay was spotted outside Los Angeles International Airport by paparazzi. The next day, she shared a link for her new single "Sucker 4 Green". Unlike her previous rap content, "Sucker 4 Green" is a dance-pop song, talking about Tay's obsession and love for money. Rolling Stone described it as a "daft punk-groove-reminiscent bop". It features lyrics like "Money, money, money/ Money, money, money/ I just can’t look away from it/ I want it, want it, want it." as well as "Some calling it a sick obsession/Nothing wrong with being rich and blessed and/ I just want a few yachts and mansions, right now."

== Music video ==
According to Entertainment Tonight, the music video for "Sucker 4 Green" features Tay dancing around a palatial modernist estate, in front of a line of suit-clad backup dancers, as well as in and around numerous high-end cars. Her mother and brother were both featured in the music video. It received 1.7 million views within a day.

== Critical reception ==
Hayley Hynes of HotNewHipHop described the song as "less rap-centric" than what people had expected to hear. Hynes also said that it sounds "ready to be played at H&M or Hollister".
