= John Slagg =

British businessman and politician

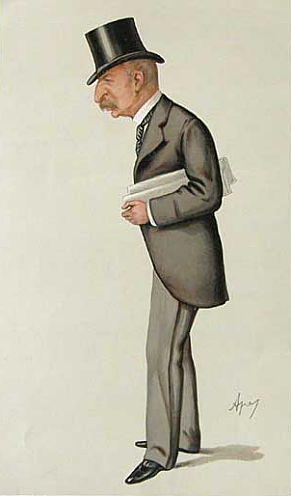
- Caricature of John Slagg by Leslie Ward ("Spy") in Vanity Fair, 1884

Member of Parliament for Burnley
- In office 1889-1893
- Preceded by: Peter Rylands
- Succeeded by: Jabez Balfour

Member of Parliament for Manchester
- In office 1880-1885 Serving with Jacob Bright, Hugh Birley, William Houldsworth
- Preceded by: Thomas Bazley
- Succeeded by: Constituency abolished

Personal details
- Born: 24 October 1834 Manchester, England
- Died: 7 May 1889 (aged 54) London, England
- Party: Liberal
- Spouse: Katherine German (m. 1866)

John Slagg (junior) (24 Oct 1837 – 7 May 1889) was a British businessman and Liberal politician. He was elected to membership of the Manchester Literary and Philosophical Society on 25 January 1859

He was the eldest son of John Slagg, a justice of the peace at Manchester, and his wife Jane née Crighton. John Slagg senior was a commission agent and merchant in the city. His friend, Anti Corn Law campaigner Richard Cobden was his son's godfather.

Slagg followed his father into business, and became president of the Manchester Chamber of Commerce. In 1885 he was appointed as a director of the Suez Canal Company. He made his home at Hopefield, Pendleton.

In 1880 he was elected as one of Manchester's three members of parliament. The Redistribution of Seats Act 1885 divided the Manchester constituency into six divisions, and Slagg stood as the Liberal candidate at Manchester North West, but was defeated. He returned to the Commons at a by-election in 1887 at Burnley.

In 1866 he married Katherine German of Sevenoaks, Kent.

John Slagg died at his Mayfair, London home in May 1889, aged 51.

Parliament of the United Kingdom
Preceded by Thomas Bazley; Hugh Birley; Jacob Bright	Member of Parliament for Manchester; 1880 – 1885; With: Jacob Bright; Hugh Birley 1880 – 1883; William Henry Houldsworth 1883 – 1885	Constituency abolished
Preceded by Peter Rylands	Member of Parliament for Burnley; 1887 – 1889	Succeeded by Jabez Spencer Balfour
Professional and academic associations
Preceded by William Baker	President of the Manchester Statistical Society; 1883–84	Succeeded by Robert Montgomery
