= William Romaine Callender =

British businessman and politician (1825 - 1876)

William Romaine Callender Jr. (1825 – 22 January 1876) was a British businessman and Conservative politician.

He was the son of William Romaine Callender of Mauldeth Hall near Manchester and his wife, Hannah Pope, of London. W. R. Callender (senior) was a prominent Whig and non-conformist in the area who campaigned for the incorporation of Manchester as a municipal borough, and served on the first town council. His son, however, became a leading Conservative and Anglican. In 1849, he married Hannah Mayson.

He entered his father's business as a cotton spinner and merchant in Manchester, eventually taking charge. He expanded the firm by the purchase of that of Sir Thomas Bazley in Bolton in 1861.

He was elected to the membership of Manchester Literary and Philosophical Society on 24 January 1854

Apart from his business activities he was a Fellow of the Society of Antiquaries, and a strong supporter of the Manchester Athenaeum, which was founded by wealthy businessmen for the education and recreation of the working classes. In 1858 he was appointed honorary secretary of the Athenaeum, a position he held until his death. He also assisted in the formation of a company of rifle volunteers in 1859. He was a freemason, and rose to be Deputy Grand Master of the Provincial Lodge of East Lancashire, and Grand Master of the Mark Masons of England.

He was elected as a member of the first Manchester School Board in 1870, and in 1874 as one of three members of parliament for the Parliamentary Borough of Manchester, defeating the Liberal MP, Jacob Bright.

In November 1875 Callender fell ill after attending an Orange Order demonstration, and was advised to travel to the south coast to aid his recovery. However, he died of "rheumatic neuralgia" at St Leonards-on-Sea, Sussex, in January 1876, aged 51. A bust of the late MP was unveiled at Manchester Town Hall in 1880.

Parliament of the United Kingdom
Preceded by Thomas Bazley; Hugh Birley; Jacob Bright	Member of Parliament for Manchester; 1874–1876; With: Hugh Birley; Thomas Bazley	Succeeded by Thomas Bazley; Hugh Birley; Jacob Bright
