= Annual Georgia European Union Summit =

The Annual Georgia European Union Summit (AGEUS) is a yearly gathering of Georgian and international economic development leaders. It occurs on the first Thursday in November. During its first nine years the event was held in Macon, Georgia, United States. In 2010 the event moved to Athens, Georgia, home of the University of Georgia.

Founded in 2001 by Christopher N. Smith, attorney and Honorary Consul of the Kingdom of Denmark for Georgia, AGEUS serves to bring together select international leaders, both from European and non-European countries, with various Georgian economic, business, and governmental leaders.

The highlight of each year is the AGEUS awards dinner, which numbers about 200 participants. Dignitary guests include prominent Georgia Consular Corps members and Trade Commissioners. Table sponsors have included such companies as UBS AG, Georgia Power, and the Georgia Department of Economic Development (GDEcD).

Each year a prominent person either from the European Union or in the field of economic development presents the keynote speech.

The finale of the event is often the presentation of the AGEUS Award for Individual Contribution in the field of Georgia economic development, which was begun in 2006, and/or the presentation of the joint AGEUS/GDEcD awards known as the Georgia Featured Export Product Awards, which began in 2007. These awards may or may not be presented each year at the discretion of the awards committee.

== Keynote speakers ==
- 2001: Herve Goyens, Consul General of Belgium, Atlanta
- 2002: Kent Fallesen, Trade Commissioner of Denmark, Atlanta, and one of the first Europeans to become Honorary Georgia Citizen
- 2003: Brian Murphey, Director of the European Union Center, The University of Georgia
- 2004: Suzanne Kürstein, Executive Director, The Danish American Business Forum, Copenhagen Denmark
- 2005: Frank Baker, Deputy Chief of Mission, British Embassy, Washington
- 2006: Matti Anttonen, Minister and Deputy Chief of Mission, Embassy of Finland, Washington
- 2007: Heidi Green, Deputy Commissioner of the Georgia Department of Economic Development for Global Commerce
- 2008: Francois Rivasseau, Deputy Chief of Mission, Embassy of France, Washington
- 2009: Claes Hammer, Minister of Economic and Foreign Affairs, Swedish Embassy, Washington
- 2010: Dr. Lutz Gorgens, Consul General of the Federal Republic of Germany, Atlanta, Georgia
