= T. S. Ashton Prize =

The T. S. Ashton Prize, established with funds donated by the late Professor T. S. Ashton (1889-1968), is awarded biennially by the Economic History Society to the author of the best article accepted for publication in the Economic History Review in the previous two calendar years, who satisfies at least one of the following conditions at time of submission:

- The author is 35 years of age or younger.
- The author is within 5 years of receipt of her/his PhD.
- The author normally has no previous publication in the field of economic and/or social history, or a closely related field.

As of 2019, the prize is currently £1,500.

== History of the prize ==
The December 1968 issue of the Review carried a brief obituary of Professor T. S. Ashton (1889-1968) by A. H. John and a flier announcing the intention to establish the Prize, initially endowed by Mrs Ashton with the sum of £500. Further donations were sought from EHS members and an initial prize suggested of £50, to be awarded annually. The Prize was formally announced in the April 1970 issue of the Review. In 1981, the value of the Prize was raised to £150, with the intention of making an award every other year. The value was raised to its current value of £750 in 1998.

Note: The Economic History Society's archives at the London School of Economics include a file, 'Correspondence relating to the TS Ashton Prize, 1971-82.'

== Winners ==
As of 2025, the following prizes have been awarded:

- 2025: Emiliano Travieso Universidad Carlos III de Madrid and Tom Westland Wageningen University, "What happened to the workshop of West Africa? Resilience and decline of handicraft textiles in colonial northern Nigeria, 1911–52", Economic History Review, vol 77, February 2024.
- 2024: Mattia C. Bertazzini University of Nottingham, "The effect of settler farming on indigenous agriculture: Evidence from Italian Libya", Economic History Review, vol 76, April 2022.
- 2023: Cheng Yang, Renmin University of China & CAMPOP, "A new estimate of Chinese male occupational structure during 1734–1898 by sector, sub-sector pattern, and region", Economic History Review, vol 75, March 2022.
- 2022: Thales Zamberlan Pereira, Sao Paulo School of Economics, "Taxation and the stagnation of cotton exports in Brazil, 1800-60", Economic History Review, vol 74, January 2021.
- 2021: Thilo N. H. Albers, Humboldt Universität zu Berlin, "Currency devaluations and beggar-my-neighbour penalties: evidence from the 1930s", Economic History Review, vol 73, April 2019.
- 2020: Jonathan Chapman, New York University, "The contribution of infrastructure investment to Britain’s urban mortality decline, 1861–1900", Economic History Review, vol 72, May 2018.
- 2019: Michiel de Haas, Wageningen University, "Measuring rural welfare in colonial Africa: did Uganda's smallholders thrive?", Economic History Review, vol 70, May 2017 AND Judy Z Stephenson, London School of Economics, "'Real' wages? Contractors, workers, and pay in London building trades, 1650-1800", Economic History Review, vol 71, February 2018.
- 2017: Charles Read, University of Cambridge, "Laissez‐faire, the Irish famine, and British financial crisis", Economic History Review, 69 (2) pp.411–34.
- 2015: Eric B Schneider, University of Sussex, "Prices and production: agricultural supply response in fourteenth-century England", Economic History Review 67 (1), pp.66-91.
- 2013: Philip Slavin, McGill University, "The Great Bovine Pestilence and its economic and environmental consequences in England and Wales, 1318-50", Economic History Review 65 (4) (2012), pp.1239-1266.
- 2011: David Chambers, (University of Cambridge),"Gentlemanly capitalism revisited: a case study of the underpricing of IPOs on the London Stock Exchange 1946-86", Economic History Review 62(1) (2009), pp.31-56.
- 2009: Jordi Domenech, University of York, "Labour market adjustment a hundred years ago: the case of the Catalan textile industry, 1880-1913", Economic History Review, 61 (1) February 2008, pp.1-25. AND Nicholas Draper, (University College London), "The city of London and slavery: evidence from the first dock companies, 1795-1800", Economic History Review, 61 (2) May 2008, pp.432-466.
- 2007: Samantha Williams, University of Cambridge, "Poor relief, labourers' households and living standards in rural England c.1770-1834: a Bedfordshire case study", Economic History Review, 58 (3) May 2005, pp.485-519.
- 2005 Ben Dodds, University of Durham, "Estimating arable output using Durham Priory tithe receipts, 1341-1450", Economic History Review, 57 (2) May 2004, pp. 245-85.
- 2003 Byung-Yeon Kim, University of Essex, "Causes of repressed inflation in the Soviet consumer market, 1965-1989", Economic History Review, 55 (1) February 2002, pp. 105-27.
- 2001 Evan Jones, University of Bristol, "Illicit business: accounting for smuggling in mid-sixteenth-century Bristol", Economic History Review, 54 (1) February 2001, pp. 17-38.
- 1998-9 A’Hearn (1998)
- 1996-7 Burnette (1997)
- 1993-5 Jointly: Bailey (1996); Ross (1996)
- 1991-2 Edgerton and Horrocks (1994)
- 1989-91 ?
- 1987-8 ?
- 1985-6 ?
- 1983-4 no award
- 1981-2 no award
- 1980 Beckett (1982)
- 1979 Middleton (1981)
- 1978 no award
- 1977 Jointly: Rubinstein (1977); Canadine (1977)
- 1976 Gatrell (1977)
- 1975 no award;;
- 1974 Dewey (1975)
- 1973 Susan Howson, University of Cambridge, "The Origins of Dear Money, 1919-20", 1973.
- 1972 Cain (1972)

== See also ==
- List of history awards
- List of economics awards
