= Raymond Streat =

British cotton trade administrator (1897–1979)

Sir Edward Raymond Streat KBE Kt. (7 February 1897 – 13 September 1979) was a British administrator associated with the cotton industry.

== Life ==
Streat was born in Prestwich, Lancashire, the fifth of six children of Edward Streat, a commercial traveller, and Helen Wallis. His father later remarried. Streat was educated at Manchester Grammar School until 1913, when he left to become an office boy. Within a few months, he defied his father's wishes by enlisting in the 18th Manchester Regiment. Thereafter, he was wounded while on active service in France during the First World War. He attained the rank of Captain before leaving the army in 1919.

After six months working for an insurance business in Manchester, Streat beat 600 applicants to become assistant secretary to the Manchester Chamber of Commerce (MCC). He was made secretary soon after, in January 1920, following the death of the incumbent officeholder. Biographer Marguerite Dupre notes that

It was a bold appointment: he was only twenty-two years old, and he became the highest-ranking permanent paid official of the richest, the largest, and probably the most influential chamber of commerce in the country. Without any member of his family having any connection with the cotton industry, he found himself secretary of an organisation dominated by merchants in the cotton trade.

Raised as a Wesleyan, like his father, but eventually becoming an Anglican, Streat married Doris Davies on 16 March 1921. The couple had three sons. He continued to work for the MCC until he was appointed as chairman of the Cotton Board in June 1940. Two years earlier, he had been elected to the court of governors of Manchester University and between 1936 and 1938 he had served as president of the Manchester Statistical Society.

When Streat left the Cotton Board in 1957, he succeeded Ernest Simon as chairman of the council of Manchester University, an institution with which he had remained connected since his first election. He had been elected to the council in 1943 and was appointed its treasurer in 1951, thus having a significant role in creating the financial structure between government and university that allowed for the building of the radio telescope facility at Jodrell Bank. The university awarded him with an honorary LL.D in 1963; he had previously been a visiting fellow of Nuffield College, Oxford, from 1944 and was elected an honorary fellow there in 1959.

Streat died in Churchill Hospital, Oxford, on 13 September 1979.

== Honours ==
Streat was appointed a Commander of the Order of the British Empire in 1930 and a Knight Bachelor in 1942. He was appointed as a Knight Commander of the Order of the British Empire in 1957.

Professional and academic associations
Preceded by A. Linney Arnold	President of the Manchester Statistical Society; 1936–38	Succeeded by T. S. Ashton
