= University of New York, Tirana =

Private university in Tirana, Albania

University of New York Tirana
- Motto: Educating Tomorrow's Leaders!
- Type: Private University
- Established: August 15, 2002
- Rector: Prof. Dr. ALİ GÜNEŞ
- Location: Tirana, Albania; 41.3150°N 19.8062°E
- Colors
- Website: www.unyt.edu.al

The University of New York Tirana (UNYT) is the first private university in Albania founded in 2002. UNYT offers English language teaching, including three cycles of studies.

== Overview ==
UNYT is the only institution in Albania which has a collaboration with the State University of New York and Empire State University by offering dual degree for Bachelor programs.

The University of New York Tirana has a collaboration with the University of Greenwich, UK, for the master's program, MSc in Computer Science.

Since 2018, UNYT has been under the ownership of the Turkish Maarif Foundation, one of the largest educational organizations in the world with 427 educational institutions in 67 countries. Since December 2020, the University of New York Tirana has been awarded 6 years of Institutional Accreditation which is the maximum evaluation in HEI in Albania. UNYT is accredited in all study programs.

The University of New York Tirana has the following faculties:

1. Faculty of Law and Social Science.
2. Faculty of Economics and Business.
3. Faculty of Engineering and Architecture
4. European and Balkan Research Institute

== Bachelor programs ==
Faculty of Economy and Business	Faculty of Engineering and Architecture	Faculty of Law and Social Sciences
Economics and Finance with profile Accounting; Economics and Finance with profile Finance; Economics and Finance with profile Economics; Applied Banking and Finance; Business Administration with profile Business Administration; Business Administration with profile Management; Business Administration with profile Business Economics; Business Administration with profile Marketing; Business Informatics; e-Business and e-Commerce	Architecture (Integrated Master of Sciences); Design with profile Graphic Design; Design with profile Interior Design; Computer Science; Telecommunication and Network Engineering; Software Engineering	International Relations with profile EU Legislation & Politics; International Relations with profile International Relations; Law (Integrated Master of Sciences); Psychology

== Master programs ==
Faculty of Economy and Business	Faculty of Engineering and Architecture	Faculty of Law and Social Sciences
Master of Science in Finance and Accounting; Master of Science in Business Administration with a concentration in: General Route, Management, Marketing, Human Resources, Banking, Management of Information Systems	Master of Science in Computer Science	Master of Science in International Commercial Law; Master of Science in International Relations; Master of Science in Psychology with a concentration in: Clinical Psychology, School Psychology, Legal Psychology

== Doctoral programs ==
PhD in Business Administration	PhD in Computer Science	PhD in Law and Diplomacy
Economics; Finance; Marketing; Management	Computer Science; Management Information Systems	Law; Political Science

== See also ==
- List of universities in Albania
- List of colleges and universities
- List of colleges and universities by country
