= Lil Tay =

American-Canadian internet personality (born 2007)

- Born: Claire Eileen Qi Hope; July 29, 2007 (age 19); Atlanta, Georgia, U.S.
- Other name: Tay Tian
- Occupations: Internet personality; rapper
- Years active: 2017–2018; 2023–present
- Agent: Jason Tian
- Musical career
- Genres: Hip hop; pop
- Instrument: Vocals

Tay Tian (born Claire Eileen Qi Hope; July 29, 2007), known professionally as Lil Tay, is an American-Canadian internet personality and musician. She first came to prominence in early 2018 at the age of ten (while claiming to be nine years old), when content depicting her boasting about being wealthy and calling herself "the youngest flexer of the century", as well as videos of her rapping, were published and viewed millions of times on YouTube and Instagram.

Tay's social media accounts became inactive after three months when her father applied to the superior court of Canada for full custody and control of her career as an influencer; full custody would eventually be granted to her mother. In 2023, Tay was the subject of widespread media coverage after a false statement announcing she had died was published from her Instagram account. Later that year, she released a single, "Sucker 4 Green".

== Early and personal life ==
Claire Eileen Qi Hope was born on July 29, 2007, to Angela Tian, a former real estate agent, and Christopher J. Hope, a lawyer. She was originally from Atlanta before moving to Vancouver, Canada, at an early age. Her parents, who never married, shared custody of Tay.

On September 12, 2024, an announcement was posted to Tian's social media platforms stating she was in the ICU in "critical condition" and was diagnosed with a heart tumor. On September 14, Tian posted an update saying that she underwent an open-heart surgery, which she described as being successful. Shortly afterwards, she released a new single, titled "Growing Up".

After her death hoax in August 2023, it was revealed that Tay's legal name had been changed from Claire Hope to Tay Tian, using her mother's surname.

== Career ==
=== Social media beginning ===
Tay became well known in early 2018 and was popular on platforms for a period of three months. She first rose to prominence through her presence on social media sites like Instagram by posting pictures of herself in luxury vehicles while wearing designer clothes. She began showing off her luxurious lifestyle, and "flexing" as well as posting rap videos on YouTube which garnered millions of views.

While her popularity was growing, Tay's mother Angela Tian came in contact with talent managers in Los Angeles, California. Tay, her mother and 16-year-old half-brother Jason moved from Tay's hometown of Vancouver, British Columbia to live in Los Angeles. According to the Atlantic she was homeschooled in Los Angeles, though her father instead said she missed 72 days of school while living there.

=== Coaching allegations and silence ===
It was reported that Tay's older half-brother Jason was in control of her social media accounts.

As Tay's actions became more public, Tay's mother, Angela Tian, faced criticism online for allowing her young daughter to create rap videos with crude language. Amid controversy and speculation that her actions were forced by her mother, Tay defended her mother in an interview on Good Morning America, saying she was not forcing Tay to act this way and that she was content with her actions.

In a May 2018 interview with BuzzFeed News, Tay's mother stated that Jason directed the videos and managed social media accounts, with the article being released amidst a reportedly leaked video of the older half-brother coaching Tay on what to say in her video. Jason, who apparently directed Tay's videos, was described by Business Insider as "reportedly domineering" while an article in The Atlantic cited someone close to Tay stating "I've seen her brother shout at her. Once Jason was yelling at her, saying, 'You're no good, it's no good.' She was crying hard".

It was also reported that Tay's mother, a real estate agent, allowed Tay and Jason to record their videos in luxurious homes she was working with and used her boss' Mercedes-Benz 550 SL to portray themselves as being owners, all of which was allegedly done without the permission of her employer. Tay's controversial videos and reputation ultimately resulted in her mother losing her job.

Summarizing the controversy, Vox wrote:

This wasn't quite the classic story of a stage mom, though; instead, Lil Tay had a stage brother. Jason, then 16, was the only one who had access to her Instagram account. He was the one who coached Lil Tay on what to say and how to say it, having studied famous YouTubers in previous attempts to get famous himself. According to reports, he was often harsh and cruel, and on at least one instance prompted her to say racial slurs.

=== Familial conflict ===
Accurate information about Tay has been difficult to confirm as she reportedly never had direct control of her public image, Vox wrote. An apparent familial conflict between Tay, her mother and half-brother against Tay's father Christopher Hope and Tay's manager Harry Tsang occurred after Tay left social media, according to The Guardian. Tay's father and manager sought for Tay to become more focused on professionalism, suggesting a music career for her, though her mother and half-brother encouraged her to continue her original boastful character.

It was then reported that Tay's father received a court order to return Tay to Vancouver and to cease content placement on Instagram; he stated that Tay missed 72 days of school after moving to Los Angeles.

In June 2018, Tay's Instagram and YouTube videos had their content abruptly deleted in an attempt to "rebrand" her image. New York reported that Tay's father sought to help Tay achieve a more professional career, looking to have her name trademarked, and to have a trust created for her earnings.

Following the court order, Tay's Instagram account was used to make unsubstantiated allegations of abuse against her father in October 2018; Tay's mother denied reports that Jason was responsible and instead said that this occurred due to a hacking event, sharing a purported police report about the incident. A separate Instagram account was reportedly made with contact information on Tay's father, including details about his workplace, allegedly to harass him.

By 2019, it was reported in an edition of New York's The Cut that Jason managed all of her social media presence and that her mother had several business meetings about Tay without her involvement or any contracts signed.

Numerous posts were made on Tay's Instagram in 2021 – reportedly by Jason – again accusing Tay's father of abuse and claiming that her father had court-ordered Tay back to Canada in order to profit from her earnings. According to ¡Hola!, Jason launched a GoFundMe page citing the abuse allegations in an attempt to earn money on Tay's behalf.

In an article by The Daily Beast, Tay's promoter responded to the posts saying they were a result of a hack and that the allegations were false, while her manager Harry Tsang said that Tay's half-brother used her Instagram account to perform "defamation and libel". Tsang also alleged that Tay's mother and half-brother had attempted to plot sexual abuse allegations against Tay's father, according to The Daily Beast.

=== OnlyFans ===
On August 3, 2025, shortly after her 18th birthday, Tay launched an OnlyFans account. After three hours of the account being open, Tay posted a screenshot on social media which showed a gross revenue of $1,024,298.

== Reception and influence ==
Tay gained the reputation of insulting her viewers while boasting about her wealth. The videos were criticized by rapper Snoop Dogg, who noted, "She need [sic] to be in school learning how to be a little girl not a dumbass grown person". Videos of her with Jake Paul at his residence and Tay feuding with internet celebrity and rapper Bhad Bhabie had more than four million views on YouTube.

Tay had been associated with rappers Chief Keef and XXXTentacion, the latter of whom she referred to as a "father figure".

== Death hoax ==
On August 9, 2023, Tay's Instagram account was updated after two years of inactivity, with a post announcing that she had died. The post also indicated that her half-brother, Jason Tian, had also died, aged 21. Their deaths were reported in the post to be "unexpected" and under investigation; however, there was immediate speculation regarding the veracity of the announcement.

Both Tay's father and self-proclaimed "former manager" initially told Insider they could not confirm or deny whether she had died, and the Vancouver and Los Angeles police departments also stated that they had no reports of her death, and were not investigating it. Variety reported receiving a statement from her management confirming her death. Journalists have observed that before her alleged death, Tay's YouTube bio read "help me".

On August 10, Tay's family reportedly told TMZ that her Instagram account had been supposedly compromised and the post announcing her death was deleted from her Instagram page following this. Fact-checking website Snopes also issued an update to their reporting about Tay after originally reporting that Tay had died. TMZ also reported that Tay provided a statement confirming that her account was hacked and that she and her brother are alive.

MacLean Law, a firm that represented Tay's mother, released a statement that her mother would receive custody of Tay, that Tay's father had to pay retroactive child support, that Tay could "advance her career" and that Tay's mother would have the ability to sign contracts on Tay's behalf.

On September 30, a few weeks after the incident, she released her lead single "Sucker 4 Green" from her upcoming debut studio album.

On August 5, 2025, Tay released another single, "Stuck in July", just days after launching her OnlyFans account.

== Discography ==
=== Singles ===
Title	Year
"Sucker 4 Green"	2023
"Growing Up"	2024
"Stuck in July"	2025

=== Promotional singles ===
Title	Year
"Money Way"	2018
