= World Chamber of Commerce =

- Abbreviation: WCC
- Formation: 2008
- Founder: Solange Warner
- Type: 501(c)(3) non-profit
- Headquarters: Atlanta, United States
- Key people: Solange Warner (Founder/Chair); Charles Shapiro (Chair); Denis Barbet (Chair); Roma Klicius (President)

The World Chamber of Commerce (WCC) is a 501(c)(3) non-profit global organization dedicated to fostering international trade, cultural and humanitarian cooperation. The World Chamber organizes initiatives and events targeted at furthering these aims. The WCC develops partnerships and acts as a liaison between international and local businesses, supporting efforts from embassies, consulates, multilateral organizations, bi-national chambers of commerce, and businesses promoting global commerce, economic, cultural and social exchange. The WCC headquarters is in Atlanta, United States.

== History ==
The World Chamber of Commerce was founded by International Trade Consultant Solange Warner in 2008. The organization's first activities were a set of successful international trade seminars which served to bring together the international and local business community in Atlanta. Warner also developed the " WCC International Hero Award" to recognize individuals who have demonstrated excellence in international trade, cultural and humanitarian work; along with the "WCC International Trade Process" to assist international business with initial complimentary advice, when entering the U.S. business market.

== Programs and events highlights ==
- "International Trade Seminars"
- "Meet the World in Atlanta"
- "World Business Forum"
- "Global Business and Environmental Summit"
- "Global Economic and Film Production Forum"

== Officers ==
The World Chamber of Commerce's honorary chairs include former Atlanta mayor and U.S. Ambassador to the United Nations Andrew Young, the former president of Colombia, Alvaro Uribe, the Premier of Bermuda, Paula Cox, presidential candidate and former Governor of New Mexico Gary Johnson, LucasFilm VP Howard Kazanjian and actor and environmentalist Ed Begley, Jr. The Executive Committee consists of three chairmen of the board- Charles Shapiro, former U.S. Ambassador to Venezuela, Denis Barbet, Consul General of France in the Southeast U.S. and Solange Warner, founder of the World Chamber of Commerce. The President of the WCC board is Roma Klicius, honorary consul of Lithuania, the vice president is Dan Moss, Jr., Senior VP at Morgan Stanley, the Secretaries are Charles Kuck and Richard Summers, attorneys at law, and the Treasurer is Wayne Johnson, Principal at Johnson Consulting Services.

== Humanitarian initiatives ==
The World Chamber of Commerce has created the initiative: "Human Trafficking Awareness to Keep Our Children Safe" to end human trafficking in concert with several humanitarian organizations. Additionally, the World Chamber of Commerce has created initiatives to provide aid to victims of earthquakes in Haiti and Chile.
