= Ursula Bright =

English suffragist and activist (1835–1915)

- Born: Ursula Mellor; 5 July 1835
- Died: 5 March 1915 (aged 79); Kensington, London, England
- Occupation: Activist
- Spouse: Jacob Bright (m. 1855)
- Children: 5
- Relatives: Frederick Pennington (grandfather)

Ursula Mellor Bright (born Ursula Mellor; 5 July 1835 – 5 March 1915), was an English suffragist and activist for married women's property rights.

== Life and career ==
Bright was born on 5 July 1835 to Joseph and Catherine Mellor. Her father, brother and grandfather, Frederick Pennington M.P., were noted for their support for women's rights. In 1855 she married Jacob Bright who was an MP for Manchester. She and her husband were founder members of the Manchester Society for Women's Suffrage in 1867. Alongside Lydia Becker the organisation's Secretary, they encouraged Lilly Maxwell, a widowed shop owner, whose name had mistakenly appeared on the register of voters in Manchester, to cast her vote in a by-election on 26 November 1867, which Bright went on to win.

When the Ladies National Association for the Repeal of the Contagious Diseases Acts was formed in 1869 then Bright was a founder member. She became the treasurer of the Married Women's Property Committee and remained active there until the Married Women's Property Act 1882 was passed. This was an act that gave women the right to control their own property. Elizabeth Cady Stanton credited Bright with the achievement in getting the bill passed, writing 'for ten consecutive years she gave her special attention to this bill ... was unwearied in her efforts, in rolling up petitions, scattering tracts, holding meetings' The passing of the Married Women's Property Act was important, as Bright had not considered that married women required the vote until this law was enacted.

She is credited with ensuring that the Local Government Act 1894 was passed which gave the vote to women in local elections. It also allowed women to stand as parish or district councillors.

== Personal life and death ==
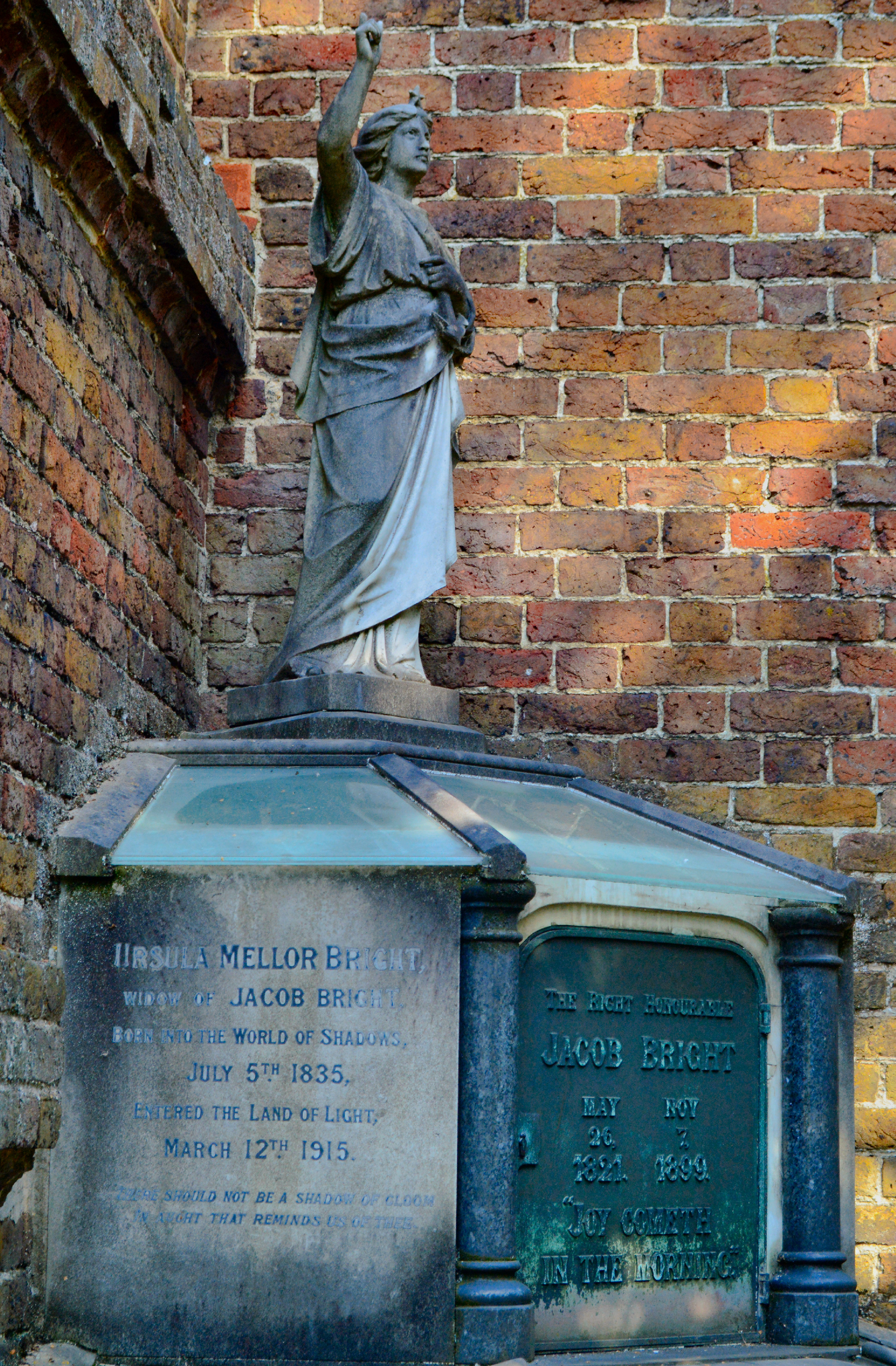
The Bright memorial, St Georges Church, Esher

Bright had five children, although two sons died very young of diphtheria within a fortnight of each other. Two further sons were born followed by a daughter Esther in 1868.

Bright's brother- and sisters- in-law included John Bright, Priscilla Bright McLaren and Margaret Bright Lucas, with whom she shared some political beliefs.

In the 1890s, Bright became interested in Theosophy. She gave Annie Besant, who was a friend of her daughter, £3,000 towards their cause. Bright was also a vegetarian.

Bright died at her home in Kensington on 15 March 1915 where she had suffered from osteoarthritis for some time. Her biographer Elizabeth Crawford notes that her obituaries hardly mentioned her campaigning work because her osteoarthritis had prevented her from involvement with the women's suffrage movement. There is a memorial for Jacob and Ursula at St George's Church, Esher.
