= Georgia Department of Economic Development =

Department of the state of Georgia, US

Georgia Department of Economic Development (GDEcD)
- Brandmark of the Georgia Department of Economic Development

Agency overview
- Jurisdiction: Georgia, United States
- Headquarters: 75 Fifth Street, N.W., Suite 1200, Atlanta, Georgia
- Agency executive: Pat Wilson, Commissioner
- Parent agency: Office of the Governor
- Website: georgia.org

The Georgia Department of Economic Development (GDEcD) is a department of the state of Georgia, United States. The GDEcD is responsible for managing resources to attract new business investments to Georgia, expand Georgia's existing industries and businesses, locate new markets for Georgian products, and promote and fund entertainment projects produced in the state.

== History ==
Originally named the Georgia Department of Commerce, the agency was established by law in 1949. Governor Herman Talmadge appointed the first five-member board under the Official Code of Georgia Annotated sections 50-7-1 through 50-7-41. George C. Gaines served as the first commissioner.

== Leadership ==
Pat Wilson was appointed Commissioner of the Georgia Department of Economic Development by Governor Nathan Deal in November 2016. As Commissioner, he leads the state agency responsible for creating jobs and investment in Georgia through business recruitment and expansion, international trade and tourism, as well as the arts, film and music industries. Christopher M. Carr served as Commissioner from November 2013 until his appointment as state Attorney General in November 2016.

== Key resources ==
- Encouraging the expansion of existing industry and small business
- Developing new domestic and international markets
- Recruiting new business to locate in the state
- Identifying key markets in Georgia for companies specific needs
- Attracting tourists to Georgia
- Promoting the state as a location for film, video, music, digital entertainment projects
- Promoting the state as a top destination for artists and arts events
- Planning and mobilizing state resources for economic development

== Agency organization ==
The Georgia Department of Economic Development is divided into seven distinct divisions: Global Commerce; International Trade; Workforce; the Georgia Centers of Innovation; Tourism; Film, Music & Digital Entertainment and the Georgia Council for the Arts. These seven divisions are supported by an Administration division and a Marketing and Communications division. Learn more about the department at Georgia.org.

=== Global Commerce Division ===
The Georgia Department of Economic Development Global Commerce Division assists businesses with an interest in growing or locating in the state by coordinating a variety of services that include site location, employee training, market research and export assistance and consultation. In FY2012, assistance from the Global Commerce division led to 403 announced projects and nearly $6B in investment.

==== Entrepreneur & Small Business Development ====
With 97% of all Georgia businesses classified as small businesses, GDEcD supports this sector through several approaches such as direct company relationships, resource awareness, B-2-B opportunities and local-level business development.

=== International Trade Division ===
The Georgia Department of Economic Development International Trade Division works closely with companies in Georgia that are looking for global markets and with international firms looking to either locate to the United States or secure American business partners.

GDEcD has international representation in 11 markets including Brazil, Canada, Chile, China, Colombia, Germany, Japan, Korea, Mexico, Israel and the United Kingdom.

==== Centers of Innovation ====
The Centers of Innovation (COI) is a program designed to accelerate the growth of technology-based companies.

The COI program is composed of six centers: agribusiness, aerospace, energy, life sciences, logistics and manufacturing. Located in Atlanta, Augusta, Gainesville, Savannah, Tifton and Eastman.

Tangible services include access to university-level research and development, product commercialization, industry-specific business counsel, matching research grants for qualified companies, networking opportunities and connecting clients to potential investor networks.

==== Georgia Allies ====
Formed in 1997 as a partnership between state government and private corporations.

=== Tourism Division ===
The Georgia Department of Economic Development Tourism Division helps individual visitors and groups discover Georgia's vacation options and helps them to plan their stay. Through its network of regional and international representatives, it also assists the state's communities and attractions in drawing potential travelers to their areas.

The state's tourism industry employs more than 400,000 people creating a total economic impact of more than $52 billion annually.

==== Specific Services ====
- Promote Georgia as a travel destination
- Providing of advice on research, public relations, group tour sales, advertising, product development and other tourism industry related topics
- Development of the state's consumer tourism website.
- Responsible for the state's official Travel Guide, Georgia Golf Guide, Calendar of Events, Kids Guide and African American Heritage Guide
- Operation of international offices, building relationships with outbound tour operators, generating media coverage and producing international travel guides
- Promotion of tourism assets to the 13 million annual visitors traveling through the state's 11 Visitor Information Centers

=== Film, Music, & Digital Entertainment Division ===
Formed in 1973, the Georgia Film, Music, and Digital Entertainment Office develops and promotes the state's feature film, television, commercial, music video, recorded music, and digital media industries.

Statewide resources and infrastructure information along with an extensive location library provide every assistance for production companies both inside and outside Georgia. The office coordinates and supports the filming needs of companies with other state agencies and local governments.

In FY2012, a $879.8 million total investment was placed into the Georgia entertainment industry creating a $3.1 billion economic impact, a 29% increase over the previous fiscal year.

==== Georgia Entertainment Industry Investment Act ====
On May 12, 2008, Governor Sonny Perdue signed into law the Georgia Entertainment Industry Investment Act, increasing the state tax credit for qualified production and post-production expenditures by as much as 30%. It is available to both traditional motion picture projects such as feature films, television series, commercials, and music videos, as well as new industries such as game development and animation.

==== Film and television ====
During FY2012, GDEcD led more than 100 feature films and television series, movies, specials, pilots, and episodes produced in Georgia, ranking the state number one in the Southeast and among the top five states in the nation for film and TV productions.

The Film, Music, & Digital Entertainment Division has helped secure Georgia as the location of choice for over 700 film and television productions. Some of the most notable films shot in Georgia include:

- Avengers: Endgame
- Avengers: Infinity War
- Beauty Shop
- Black Panther
- Captain America: Civil War
- Deliverance
- Driving Miss Daisy
- Dumb & Dumberer
- Forrest Gump
- Freaky
- Fried Green Tomatoes
- Get Low
- Glory
- Midnight in the Garden of Good & Evil
- My Cousin Vinny
- Not Without My Daughter
- Road Trip
- Roots
- Scream 2
- Smokey and the Bandit
- Sweet Home Alabama
- The Big Chill
- The Blind Side
- The Fighting Temptations
- The General's Daughter
- The Longest Yard
- The Vampire Diaries
- We Are Marshall
- We Were Soldiers
- Zombieland

==== Music ====
The GDEcD Film, Music, & Entertainment Division oversees statewide efforts in Georgia' music industry.

The current estimated economic impact of the music industry in Georgia is approaching $2 billion annually. The industry is responsible for maintaining 9,500 jobs and generating $54.3 million in tax revenues.

Major recording artists and producers with Georgia ties:

- Alan Jackson
- Allman Brothers
- Outkast
- B-52s
- Elton John
- James Brown
- Otis Redding
- Ray Charles
- R.E.M.
- John Mayer
- Zac Brown Band
- Indigo Girls
- Ludacris
- Lil Tay
- Lady Antebellum
- Sugarland
- Ciara
- T-Pain
- India.Arie
- Young Jeezy
- Ne-Yo
- Usher
- T.I.
- Akon
- Jermaine Dupri
- Jessye Norman
- Toni Braxton
- Bow Wow
- Collective Soul

==== Digital Entertainment ====
The Music & Entertainment Digital Entertainment branch houses emerging media industries such as game development, animation, and interactive entertainment.

Currently, more than 30 video game businesses operate in the state. Georgia's video game workforce is benefited by 15 of the state's colleges and universities offering video game development courses or curriculums, including some graduate degree programs.
