= Jacob Bright =

19th century British Liberal Party politician

The Right Honourable Jacob Bright
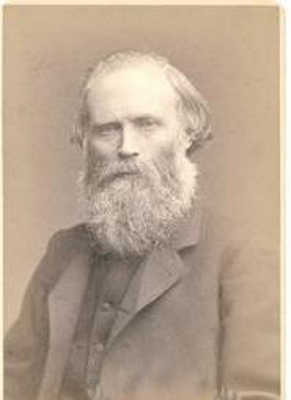
- Jacob Bright

Member of Parliament for Manchester
- In office 1867–1874
- Preceded by: Thomas Bazley, Edward James
- Succeeded by: Thomas Bazley, Hugh Birley, William Romaine Callender

Member of Parliament for Manchester
- In office 1876–1885
- Preceded by: Thomas Bazley, William Romaine Callender, Hugh Birley
- Succeeded by: Constituency abolished

Member of Parliament for Manchester South West
- In office 1886–1895
- Preceded by: Lord Frederick Spencer Hamilton
- Succeeded by: William Johnson Galloway

Mayor of Rochdale
- In office 1856–1857
- Preceded by: Post created
- Succeeded by: Robert T. Heape

Councillor for Rochdale
- In office 1856–1857

Personal details
- Born: Jacob Bright; 26 May 1821 Rochdale, Lancashire, England
- Died: 7 November 1899 (aged 78) Goring-on-Thames, Oxfordshire, England
- Party: Liberal Party
- Spouse: Ursula Mellor Bright
- Children: 3
- Occupation: Politician

The Rt Hon. Jacob Bright (26 May 1821 – 7 November 1899) was a British Liberal politician serving as Mayor of Rochdale and later Member of Parliament for Manchester.

== Background ==
Bright was born at Green Bank near Rochdale, Lancashire. He was the fourth of eleven children of Jacob Bright and Martha Wood. His father was a Quaker and had established a cotton-spinning business at Fieldhouse. His elder brother, John Bright, was a radical politician, and his sister, Priscilla Bright McLaren, campaigned for women's rights.

Jacob Bright was educated at the Friends School in York before entering the family business of John Bright & Brothers, cotton-spinners. Bright and his brother Thomas managed the firm, and by 1885 the business had expanded into carpet manufacture. He was also responsible for introducing the linotype machine to England.

Bright was an anti-vivisectionist. He was an honorary member of the National Anti-Vivisection Society.

== Career ==
=== Civic politics ===
Bright became involved in radical politics and supported Chartism. He was the first mayor of Rochdale on the town's incorporation as a municipal borough. He stood for election in 1865 in Manchester. Although unsuccessful on his first attempt, he won a by-election in 1867. The election was notable because Lilly Maxwell voted for Bright. This vote by a woman was later overturned. Bright was one of the earliest supporters of the construction of the Manchester Ship Canal.

=== National politics ===
Bright held his seat at the general election in 1868. He lost his seat at the 1874 general election, but was returned to parliament at the by-election in 1876. When the three-seat Parliamentary Borough of Manchester was divided into eight single-seat constituencies in 1885, Bright was selected as the Liberal candidate for the new Manchester South West constituency. He was defeated in 1885, but successful in the general election in 1886. As a Member of Parliament, Bright was considered an "advanced radical". He was a peace campaigner and supported women's suffrage.

Bright remained as MP for South West Manchester until 1895. Upon retirement, Bright was sworn into the privy council at the suggestion of Lord Rosebery. Jacob Bright died at midnight on 7/8 November 1899, aged 78, at his residence, "Nunn's Acre", Goring-on-Thames, Oxfordshire. He was cremated without a funeral service. The central committee of the Society for Women's Suffrage passed a resolution recognising his contribution to the movement. There is a memorial for Jacob and Ursula at St George's Church, Esher.

== Family ==
In 1855, Bright married Ursula Mellor Bright, daughter of a Liverpool merchant and campaigner for women's rights. They had three children.

== Gallery ==
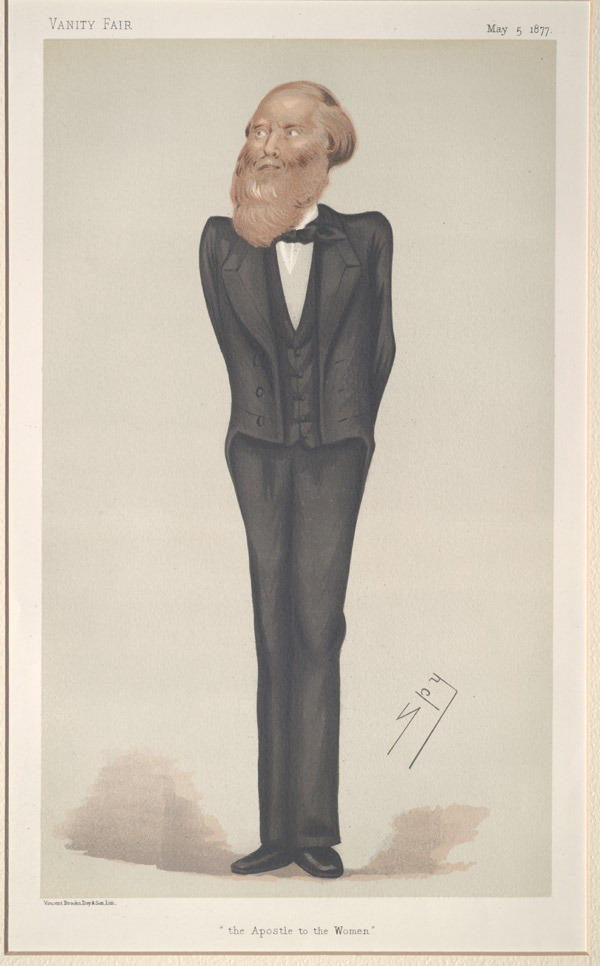
"The Apostle to the Women". Caricature by Spy published in Vanity Fair in 1877

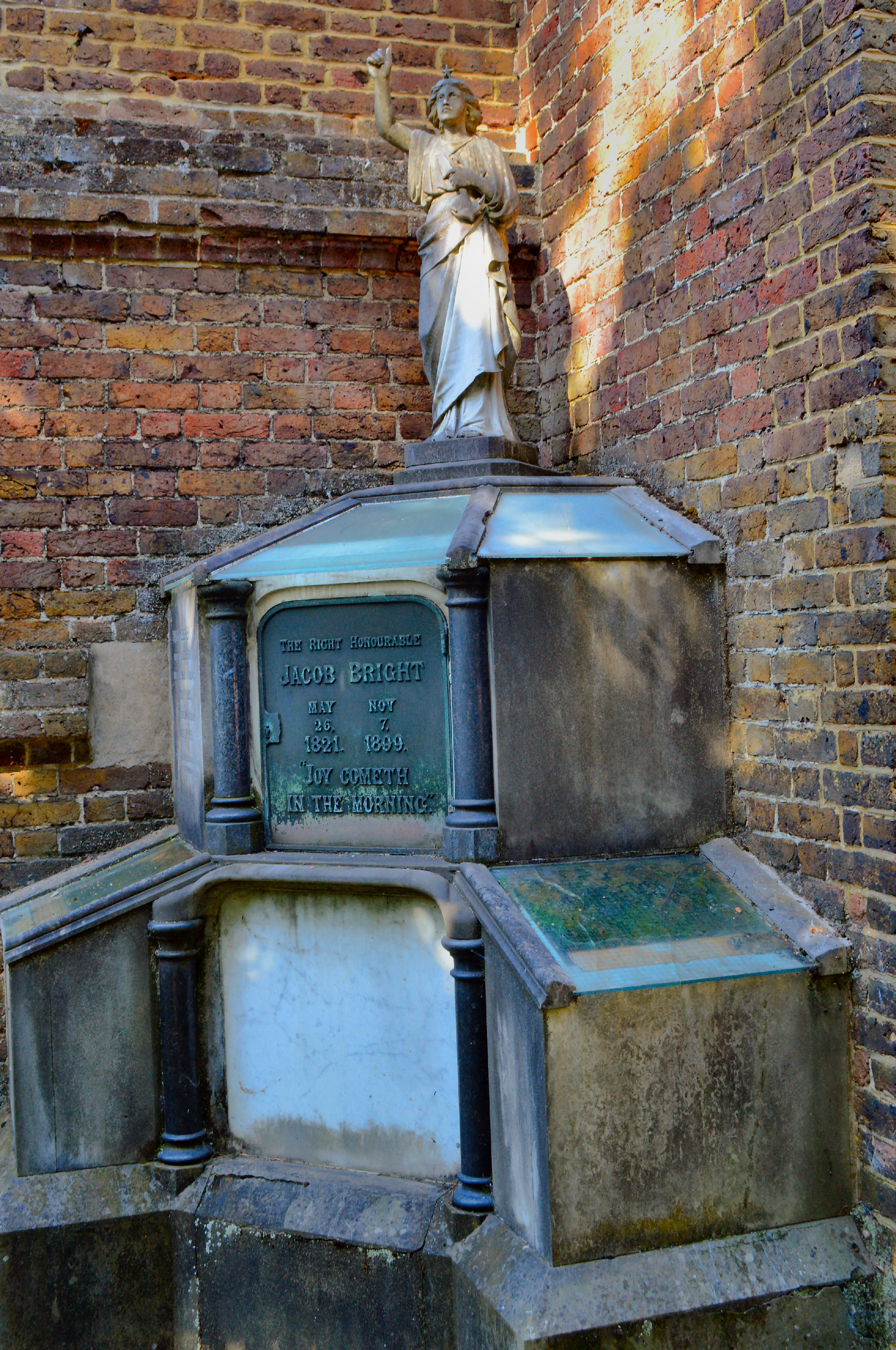
The Bright memorial, St Georges Church, Esher

Parliament of the United Kingdom
Preceded by Thomas Bazley; Edward James	Member of Parliament for Manchester; 1867 – 1874; With: Thomas Bazley 1858–1880; Hugh Birley from 1868	Succeeded by Thomas Bazley; Hugh Birley; William Romaine Callender
Preceded by Thomas Bazley; William Romaine Callender; Hugh Birley	Member of Parliament for Manchester; 1876 – 1885; With: Thomas Bazley to 1880; Hugh Birley to 1880; William Henry Houldsworth from 1880; John Slagg 1880–1885	Constituency abolished
Preceded by Lord Frederick Spencer Hamilton	Member of Parliament for Manchester South West; 1886 – 1895	Succeeded by William Johnson Galloway
Civic offices
New post	Mayor of Rochdale; 1856–1857	Succeeded by Robert T. Heape
