= Prince Armory =

- Industry: Artist
- Founded: 2007
- Founder: Samuel Lee
- Products: leather art
- Website: www.princearmory.com

Founded by American leatherworker and artist Samuel Lee (November 9, 1984), Prince Armory's work has been featured in commercials, Broadway tours, and is popular among comic book fans on the internet.

== Early life ==
Born in Houston, Texas, Lee developed a love for drawing and medieval armor at a young age, gathering inspirations from animated shows like X-Men, Batman, Transformers, as well as watching shows from the anime genre.

In his late teens, Lee became interested in Live action role-playing games and renaissance festivals, and it was at these events is where he was first introduced to the craft of leatherworking. He started his crafting with a beginner kit from Tandy Leather. These events became a pastime where he would imagine weapons and costumes to make for himself and friends.

== Prince Armory ==
Lee founded Prince Armory in 2007, making highly detailed wearable leather art in the form of medieval fantasy armor. As his skills, business, and reputation continued to evolve, Lee's creations have been featured on television and Broadway, many commissions selling for over $15,000 each.

His work has appeared on the television show Shipping Wars, and some of his work can be seen featured in a Samsung Smart TV commercial. Lee was commissioned to craft the armor for Prince Charming and his knights for Cinderella (2013 Broadway production). Lee's distinctive style featured in his commissioned pieces has quickly given Prince Armory internet popularity, being featured by Nerdist, MTV, Stan Winston School of Character Arts, Business Insider, and more.
