= Ann Lemoine =

British chapbook publisher

Ann Lemoine (born Ann Swires, fl. 1786 – 1820) was a British chapbook bookseller and publisher who specialized in Gothic Blue Books. She innovated the marketing and distribution of short Gothic tales. Her works were found in prominent circulating libraries. On 8 January 1786, she married Henry Lemoine at St Luke Old Street. Lemoine was an author, pedestrian bookseller, and chapbooker. They had two children. By 1794, the Lemoines encountered financial troubles in their business, which led to the husband's imprisonment. She separated from Henry who was shortly reduced to selling books without an office although he went on to write several non-fiction works. Meanwhile, Ann had begun publishing chapbooks on her own in 1795. By 1798, Lemoine established her own business as a London publisher, publishing more than 400 chapbooks between 1795 and 1820, some of which she may have written.

== Bibliography ==
- Bearden-White, Roy (2007). How the Wind Sits; Or, The History of Henry and Ann Lemoine, Chapbook Writers and Publishers of the Late Eighteenth Century. ISBN 978-0-549-37869-3.
