= Henry Lemoine (disambiguation) =

Henry Lemoine may refer to:

- Henry Lemoine (1786-1854), French piano teacher, music publisher, composer
- Henry Lemoine (writer) (1756–1812), English writer

== See also ==
- Henri Lemoine (disambiguation)
