= George Hurst (artist) =

American leather artist (born 1933)

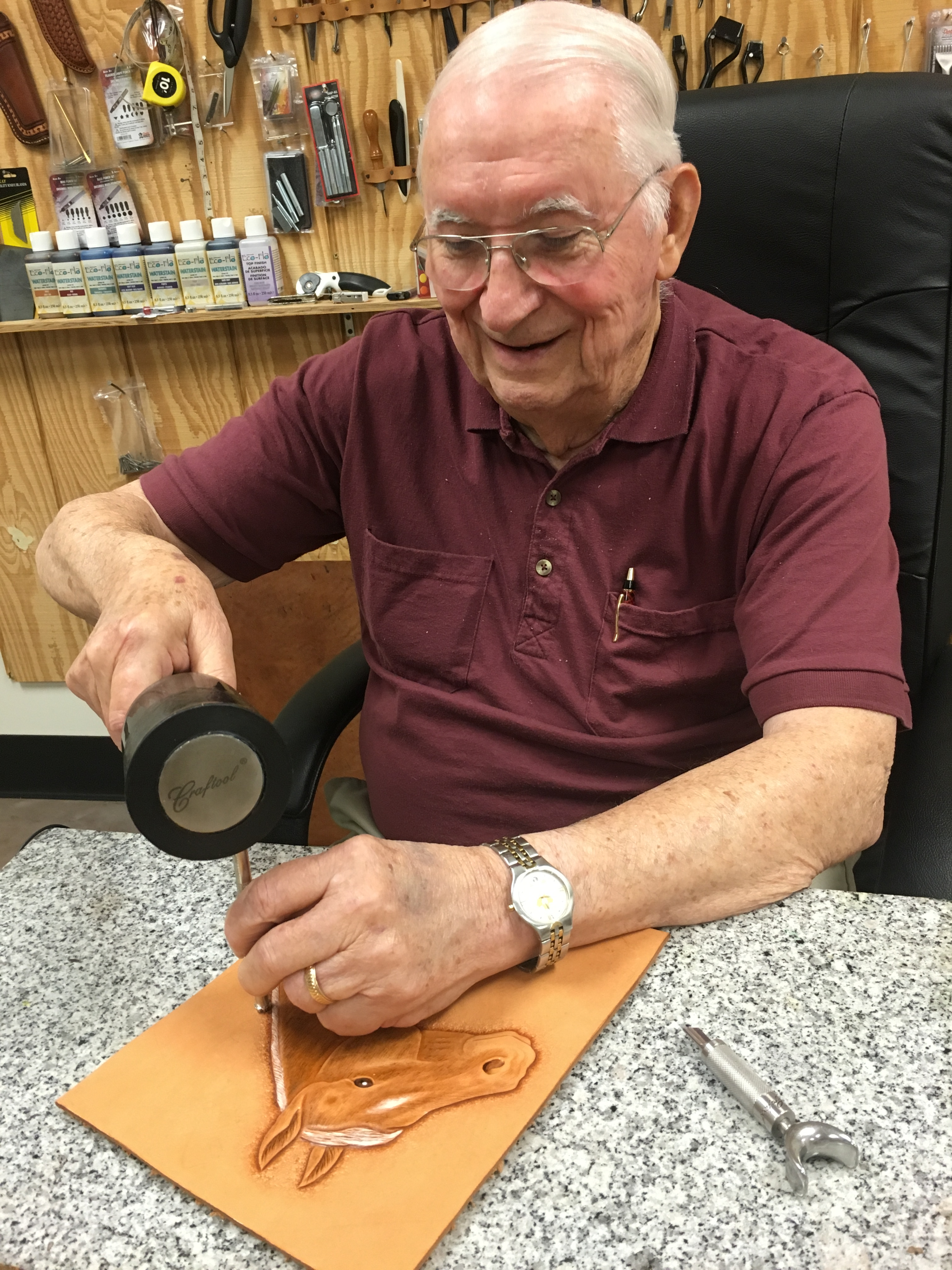
George Hurst Tooling Leather

George Hurst (April 1, 1933 – September 13, 2022) was an American leather artist known for his contributions to leathercraft instruction. With nearly 8 million views on his leatherworking tutorial videos on YouTube, Hurst is recognized internationally as a teacher. His contributions to the leather industry over the last 50 years have been recognized with an Al Stohlman Award for Achievement in Leathercraft, the Lifetime Achievement Award by the International Federation of Leather Guilds, and the Master Leather Artisan Award by the Academy of Western Artists.

== Early life ==
George Hurst was born in New Berlin, Pennsylvania in 1933. He was first introduced to leatherworking in shop class in highschool and began selling his work to family and friends. When Hurst joined the Army in 1952, he continued to pursue leathercraft as a profitable hobby. After he left the Army in 1955, he ran a furniture manufacturing business while operating his independent leather business as a part-time avocation before deciding to make a career of it.

== Leatherworking career ==
In June 1961, Hurst took his first job with Tandy Leather as an Assistant Manager in Philadelphia, Pennsylvania. 20 months later, he was promoted to manager of a store in New York City before moving back to manage the Pennsylvania store in 1966. Hurst built his store's business through innovative teaching techniques and was regularly one of the top selling managers in the company. After 9 years in Philadelphia, Hurst was promoted to Regional Manager in 1975 and then appointed Merchandising Manager in 1976. As the Merchandising Manager, Hurst regularly reported to Charles Tandy and served as the company's liaison with author Al Stohlman.

After leaving the company in 1978 to help establish The Leather Factory, Hurst was rehired by Tandy Leather as Merchandising Manager in 1985. While in this position, Hurst modernized leathercraft education by teaching leatherworking by means of video. Hurst pursued entrepreneurial efforts in the early 90s and started Hide Crafters Leather, where he hired leather veteran Jim Linnell to help build the new business. He later sold the inventory of the company to Double K Leather and returned to Tandy Leather to lead their digital media efforts.
