= Tandy Leather Factory =

American leather retailer

Tandy Leather Factory, Inc.
- Formerly: The Leather Factory, Inc.
- Type: Public
- Traded as: Nasdaq: TLF
- Industry: Retail
- Predecessors: Midas Leathercraft Tool Company; Brown Group, Inc.
- Founded: 1919 in Fort Worth, Texas
- Founders: Norton Hinckley; Dave L. Tandy
- Headquarters: Fort Worth, Texas
- Number of locations: 108 (2013)
- Area served: Worldwide
- Key people: Johan Hedberg (CEO) Daniel Ross (GC)
- Products: Leather goods and related products
- Revenue: ▲$78.284 million (2013)
- Operating income: ▲$11.226 million (2013)
- Net income: ▲$7.265 million (2013)
- Total assets: ▲$56.398 million (2013)
- Number of employees: 571 (2013)
- Subsidiaries: The Leather Factory, LP; The Leather Factory of Canada, Ltd; Tandy Leather Co., LP; Tandy Leather Factory UK, Ltd. Tandy Leather Factory Australia Pty, Ltd. Tandy Leather Factory España, SL
- Website: www.tandyleather.com

Tandy Leather Factory, Inc. is an American specialty retailer and wholesale distributor of leather and leatherwork related products. It operates more than 100 stores worldwide. Originally part of the Tandy Corporation, Tandy Leather has gone through a series of acquisitions and mergers, eventually being sold to The Leather Factory in 2000. The Tandy Leather flagship store next to their corporate headquarters in Fort Worth, Texas also houses the Al and Ann Stohlman Leathercraft Museum.

== Origin ==
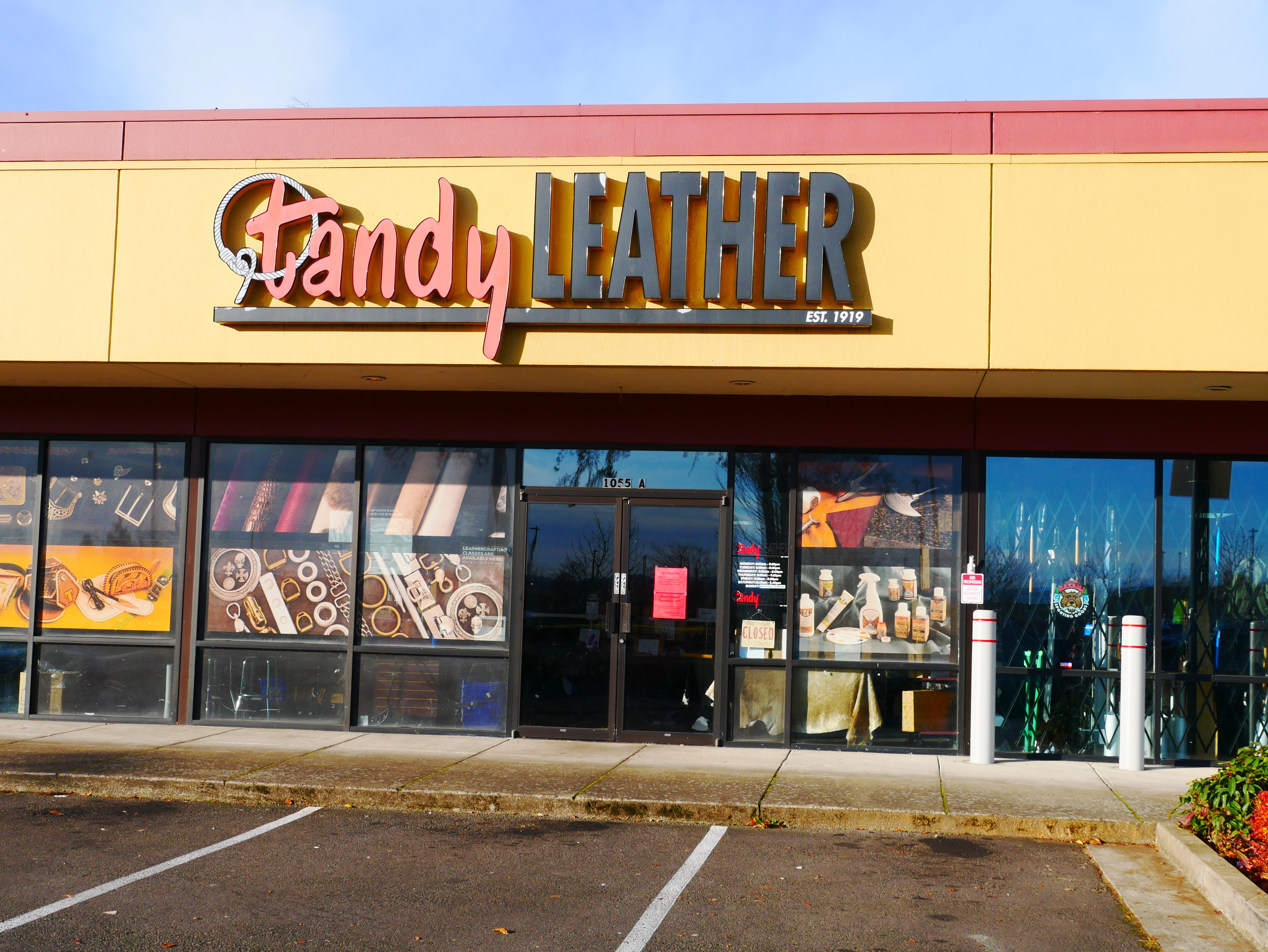
Tandy Leather store in Eugene, Oregon

Tandy Leather began as a family-owned leather goods company based in Fort Worth, Texas in 1919. Norton Hinckley and Dave L. Tandy partnered to start the Hinckley-Tandy Leather Company and concentrated their efforts on selling sole leather and other supplies to shoe repair dealers in Texas. During World War II, civilian leather rationing prompted the company to move towards leatherworking as a hobby, which gave the company supply priority by providing for the armed forces.

Tandy's son, Charles joined the business after returning from the war in 1948. He had been tracking the growth of leathercraft through correspondence with his father and wanted to put more focus on this industry. Among his first moves was the opening of the first two retail stores in 1950 specializing exclusively in leathercraft. Norton Hinckley did not agree with the transition and the founders came to an agreement where the company split and Hinckley would continue in the shoe findings industry.

Tandy Leather relied heavily on its formula of mail order sales, however the venture made a 100 percent return on investment the first year. Tandy had $2.9 million in sales and opened 15 stores within the first two years. The following decade was filled with rapid growth through the continuous opening of new stores and the acquisition of other handicraft companies. By 1961, Tandy Leather was operating 125 stores in 105 cities of the United States and Canada and the company name was changed to Tandy Corporation. In 1963, Tandy Corporation acquired management control of the Radio Shack Corporation and, after two years, Charles Tandy had turned the company's $4 million loss into a profit. During that time of recovery, the Tandy Corporation purchased common stock until they owned 85% of the outstanding Radio Shack common stock.

In 1975, the Tandy Corporation Board of Directors announced a plan to separate Tandy's businesses into three distinct publicly held companies. The two new companies would be named Tandycrafts, Inc. and Tex Tan-Hickok, Inc. This plan was publicized as a strategy to provide intensive leadership and tailored management of the three distinct and diverse businesses of the company. With this transition, Radio Shack and Tandy Leather Company were no longer under the same corporate umbrella.

== The beginning of The Leather Factory ==
Wray Thompson was promoted to President of Tandy Leather Company in 1976 and Dave Ferrill was promoted to the position of National Sales Manager; they oversaw 288 stores. Ron Morgan was promoted to the Eastern Divisional VP in 1977. Although they opened their 300th store that year, the popularity of Nature-Tand's products had begun to slide as reflected by their sales and profit records. Charles Tandy died unexpectedly on November 4, 1978, at the age of 60. Concurrently, key stakeholders began to question the direction of the company and Wray Thompson resigned from his position as president.

Wray Thompson's future in the leathercraft industry was uncertain, however Ron Morgan paid Wray Thompson a visit and the two colleagues began to brainstorm; before the evening was over, they had developed an informal plan for a shared new enterprise in the leathercraft industry.

Initially three separate companies were set up:

- Midas Leathercraft Tool Company, Inc. – an importer/exporter of New Zealand made tools
- MT Enterprises – a partnership engaged in finding and developing customers to consult in the leathercraft industry
- Midas Leathercraft – a retail leathercraft store similar to that of a Tandy store, where the partners would also office.

Shortly thereafter, the partners were contacted by the Scholze Tannery, a division of The Brown Group in Chattanooga, Tennessee, to solicit a consulting agreement to help Scholze join the leathercraft market. Wray Thompson and Ron Morgan departed for Chattanooga, TN in 1980 to set up the new company later to be known as The Leather Factory. Prior to their departure they hired Jon Thompson, Wray Thompson's oldest son, to begin the task of setting up Midas Leathercraft retail operations in Arlington, TX.

With merchandise finally in Tennessee, Jon Thompson was called to Chattanooga as he had been waiting three months to open his own store as a dealer for The Leather Factory in Arlington, TX. Help in Tennessee was still sparse, so Jon Thompson pulled, packed and shipped his own store opening merchandise order before driving straight through from Tennessee to Texas before the freight truck arrived.

By 1984, the manufacturer Ivan Leathercraft was producing over 1,000 items for Midas Leathercraft Tool Company, who then supplied those items to The Leather Factory and others. They had opened six stores and named George Hurst, long-time associate and ex-merchandising manager for Tandy, general manager of The Leather Factory. Regardless of their mounting success, the Brown Group decided to sell off or close down all companies that were under $100 million annually, unprofitable or non-shoe related. The Leather Factory, consisting of six locations, was offered for sale.

== Midas Leathercraft purchases assets of The Leather Factory ==
Through Midas Leathercraft Tool Company, the partners purchased the assets of The Leather Factory in January 1985. Midas, with just over $200,000 in assets, took on a debt of just under $1.2 million for the asset purchase of the company. Two of the six managers chose not to gamble on new owners, so Wray Thompson called on former Tandy Leather Regional Manager Clyde Angus and his son, Mark, who had run the family's western store in Pennsylvania.

The Leather Factory introduced their wholesale club in 1986. Membership fees were allocated to the advertising budget which allowed the company to produce more mailing pieces and sales. By 1989, they had moved their warehouse and factory from Chattanooga to Fort Worth, Texas, and opened their twelfth location.

By 1991, The Leather Factory had acquired American Leather Company and fourteen stores were open. Wray Thompson and Ron Morgan promoted from within to free them up from day-to-day buying and selling. Jon Thompson was put in charge of operations and Mark Angus, The Leather Factory leader in sales gains and profits, was promoted to sales manager and relocated to Ft. Worth. Greg Sartor, former president of ST Leather, was hired as the craft sales manager. In 1993, The Leather Factory went public via a reverse merger on the American Stock exchange and five new Vice Presidents were named: Jon Thompson, Dave Ferrill, Mark Angus, Greg Sartor and Robin Myers Morgan.

== TLF purchases Tandy Leather Company ==
In 1999, Tandy Leather Company closed all of its sales units and became solely a mail order/internet marketer. On November 30, 2000, The Leather Factory purchased the operating assets of Tandy Leather Company. Shannon Greene, who joined the company in 1997 as controller, was named Chief Financial Officer and The Leather Factory hired Jim Linnell to develop and lead a new chain of Tandy Leather stores.

In 2005, The Leather Factory name was officially changed to Tandy Leather Factory. CEO Wray Thompson stated

Tandy Leather Company, founded by Charles Tandy and his father, was the first U.S. company dedicated to leathercraft. As such, we believe that Tandy’s name recognition is the best in the industry. On the other hand, The Leather Factory has provided over twenty years of stability and predictability that enabled us to purchase Tandy Leather Company several years ago. In order to accurately reflect the long-term stability of The Leather Factory while at the same time promote the name recognition of Tandy Leather Company, it makes sense to change our corporate name to Tandy Leather Factory, Inc.

— Wray Thompson, CEO

In 2006, Wray Thompson retired after nearly 50 years in the industry – having been president of Tandy Leather with 21 years of service and co-founder of The Leather Factory over 27 years. Ron Morgan, the company's president since 2001, was appointed the new CEO.

Ron Morgan and Robin Myers Morgan both retired in 2009, with 40 and 39 years in the industry. Jon Thompson, the company's president and chief operating officer, was named CEO of Tandy Leather Factory. Other executives include Mark Angus as senior vice president and Shannon Greene as chief financial officer.

In 2012, Tandy opened a second European location in Cadiz, Spain. International markets were expanded further in 2011 with the opening of the first Australian combination wholesale/retail store in Minto, just outside Sydney. In 2013, Tandy opened its Flagship store next to the headquarters and Bob Moore Construction was awarded the TEXO/AGC Distinguished Building Award for the design of the glass building that can be seen from the nearby Interstate 20. The Al and Ann Stohlman Museum has been moved to the lobby of the Tandy Leather Factory headquarters.

== Tandy Leather Museum & Gallery ==
In the lobby of the Tandy Leather corporate headquarters in Fort Worth, Texas, there is a public museum and art gallery featuring historic pieces of leather art, including the Al and Ann Stohlman Collection. Other artists' work on exhibit include Ken Griffin, George Hurst, Jim Linnell, Al Shelton, Christine Stanley, and others.
