= Jim Linnell =

Leather craftsman

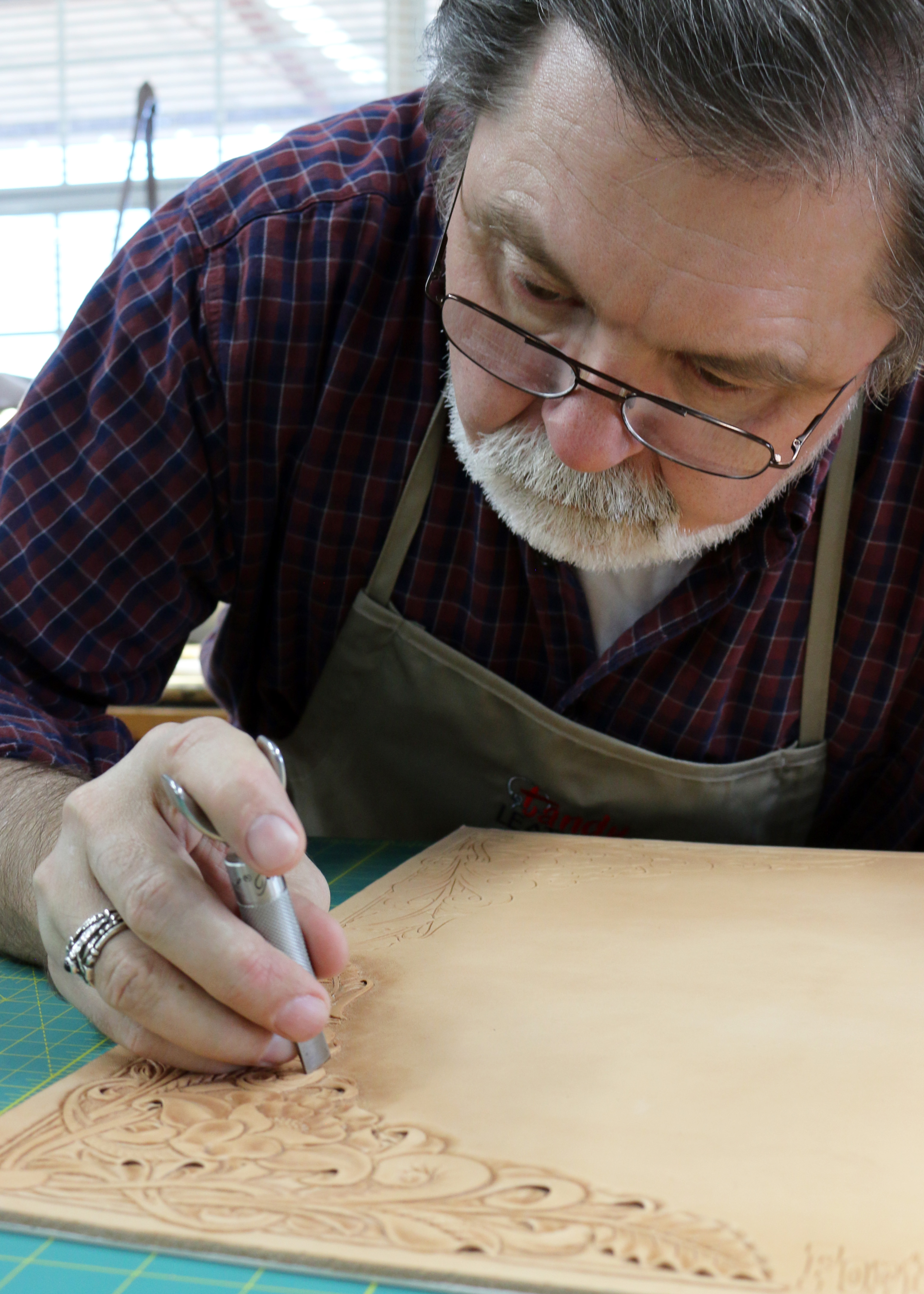
Jim Linnell working on a leather art commission for the Lonesome Dove Reunion

Jim Linnell is a leather craftsman who has dedicated much of his life to the promotion of leather working as an art form.

Linnell was raised in southeastern Montana, where he was first introduced to leather working in an industrial arts class in Junior High. He enjoyed working with leather and began making small projects that he would sell to classmates at enough of a profit to buy a new tool or pattern. After high school, he worked at Boyd's Boot and Saddle in Miles City, Montana for several years, where he made custom leather goods and taught classes.

== Professional career ==
He began working for Tandy Leather in 1978 and managed multiple stores with the chain during his career. In 1983, Linnell was recognized with the salesman's Victor Award by the Fort Worth Sales & Marketing Executives Association for leading sales gains and profit improvements in the 275-store retail chain.

He went on to serve as the president of Joshua's Christian bookstores in 1990, where he served for 7 years before they were purchased by Family Christian Stores. Linnell went on to pursue several entrepreneurial efforts, including founding Texas Wholesale Leather and helping build Hide Crafters Leather with George Hurst. He returned to Tandy Leather as Director of Operations in 2002. He later served as the National Advertising Manager for the brand, before retiring in April 2017.

During his tenure at Tandy Leather, Linnell dedicated much of his time to promoting leathercraft, having taught in 39 states, Europe, and England. He also developed a 4-H leathercraft program in Puerto Rico in collaboration with their Department of Agriculture. He also teaches a free annual class for youth at the Sheridan Leather show.

In 2017, Linnell retired from Tandy Leather and started Elktracks Studio Foundation, a non-profit organization dedicated to preserving the history of leathercraft through teaching, both online and in workshops around the world.

== Awards and achievements ==
Linnell spent four months creating a leather piece that was signed by the cast of Lonesome Dove and auctioned for $28,000 at the Lonesome Dove Reunion Gala in Fort Worth, Texas. His efforts to help grow leathercraft have been recognized with the Al Stohlman Award for Achievement in Leathercraft in 2002, the Lifetime Achievement Award from the International Federation of Leather Guilds in 2006, and the Academy of Western Artists’ Master Leather Artisan award in 2013. In 2017, Linnell was commissioned by the AWA to create a leather portrait of Will Rogers for the cover of their annual awards show. His work has also been featured on numerous catalog, magazine, and album covers over the last 20 years.
