= Ken Griffin (disambiguation) =

Ken Griffin (born 1968) is an American hedge fund manager.

Ken or Kenneth Griffin may also refer to:

- Ken Griffin (organist) (1909–1956), American organist
- Ken Griffin (saddler and magician) (1914–1988), American cowboy, leather worker, author, and magician
