= Saddle stitch =

Hand-sewing stitch

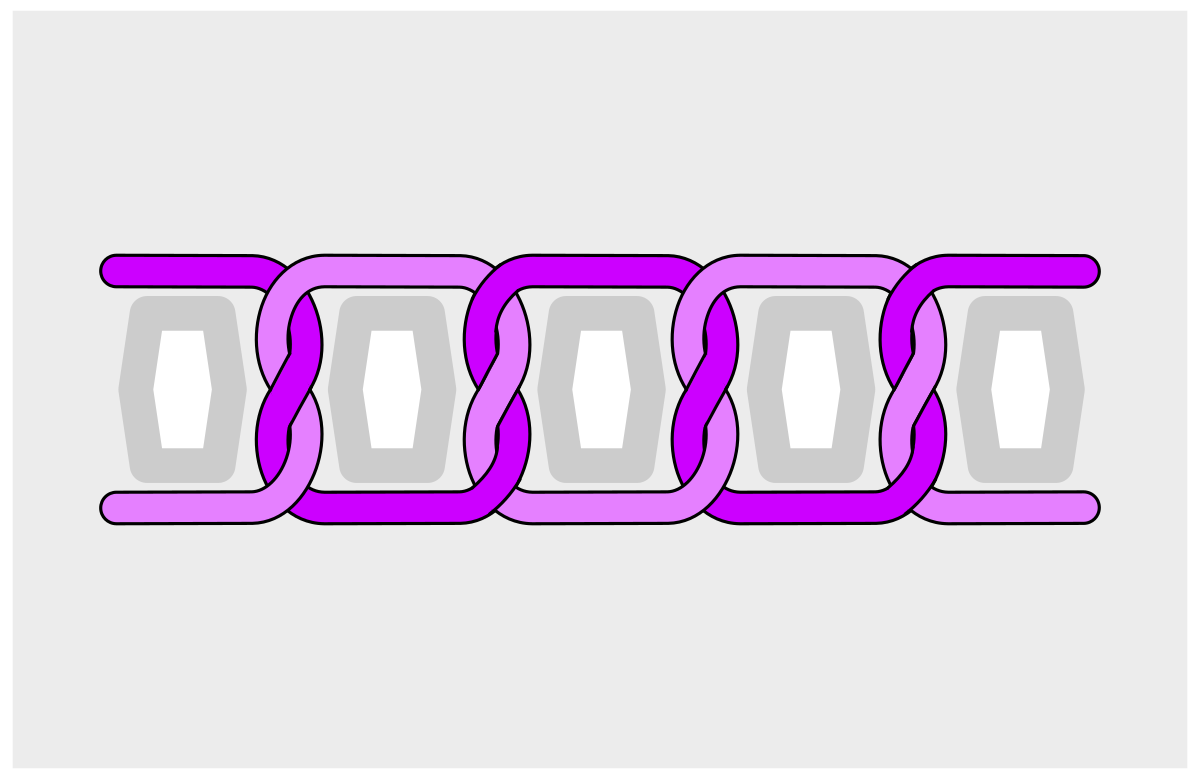
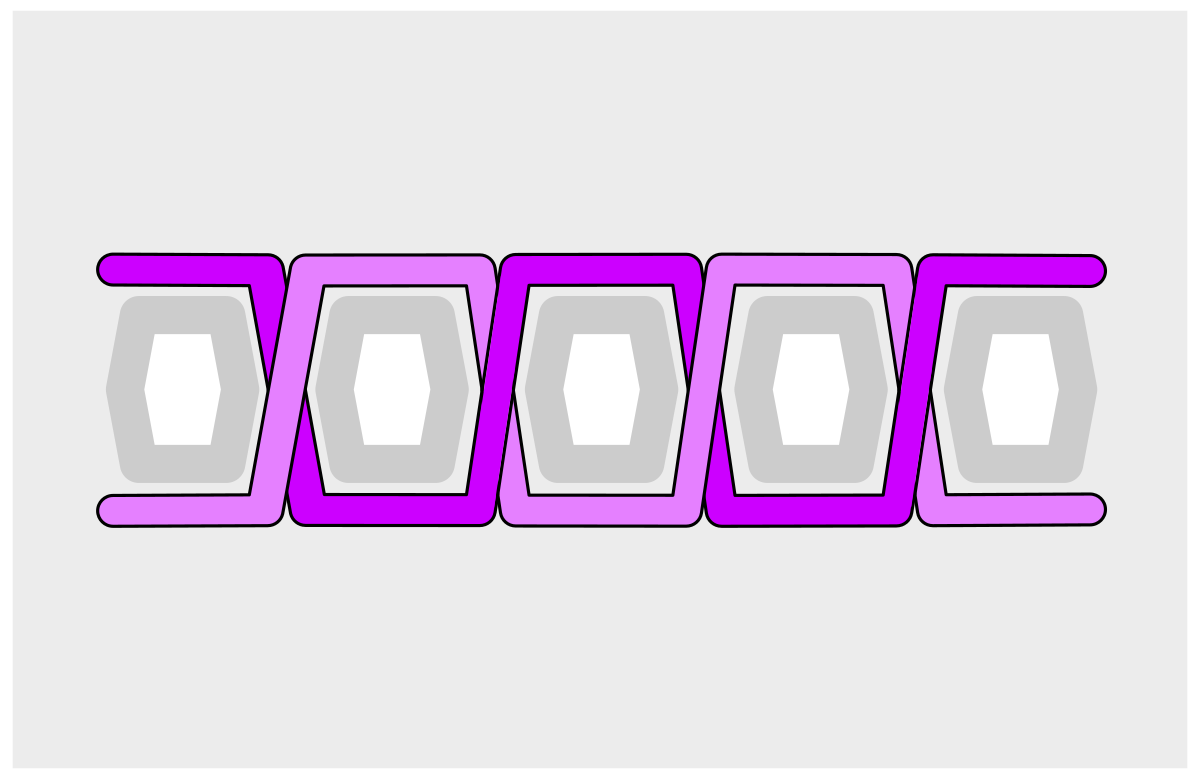
Two variations of saddle stitches, with (left) and without (right) cast

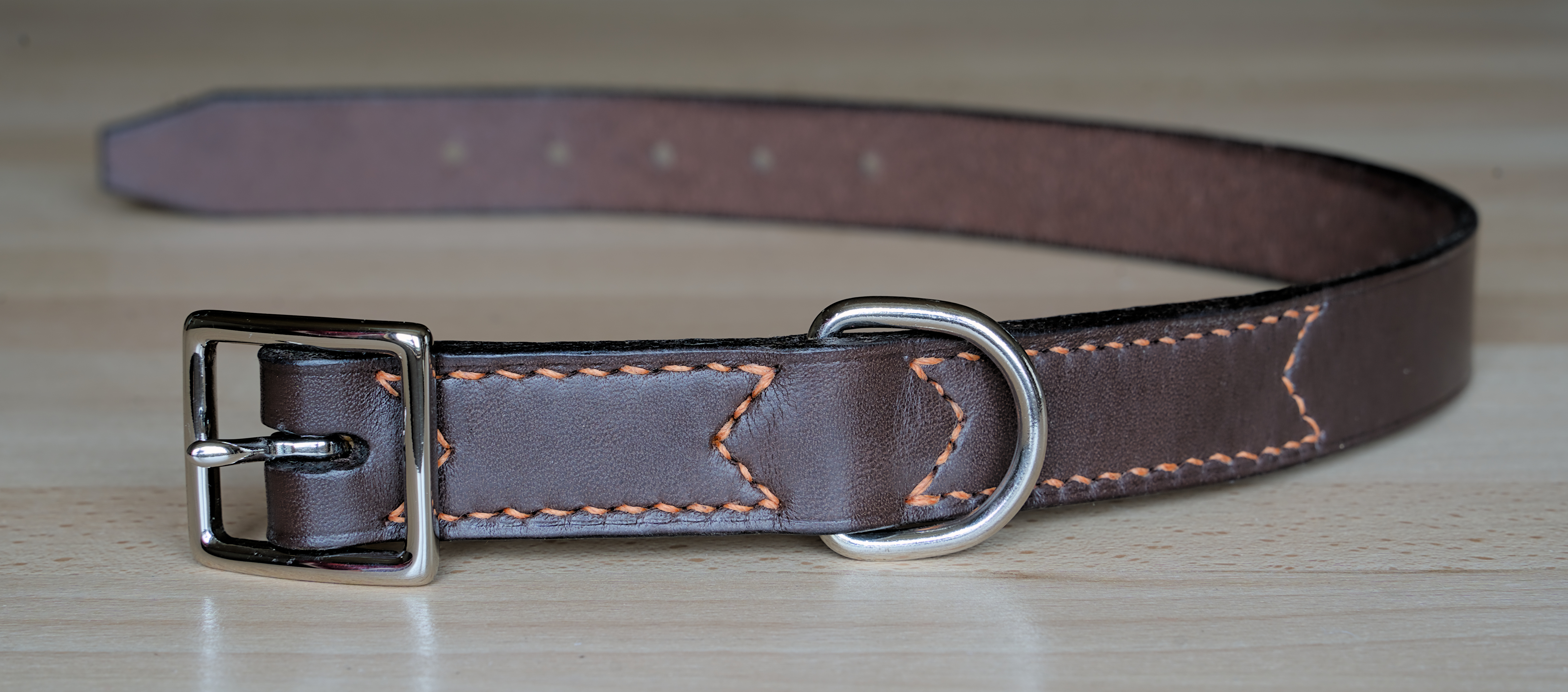
Saddle stitches on a dog collar

Saddle stitch is a hand-sewing stitch commonly used in bookbinding, saddle and bridle making, leathercraft, and shoemaking.

== Structure ==
Saddle stitch uses two threads in alternating running stitches through a single line of holes. The holes may be created by the sewing needles themselves in lighter materials, or by an awl, pricking iron, or stitching iron in thicker materials, such as leather.

Compared to the more common lockstitch often sewn by machine, breaking one side of a saddle stitch loosens only one side of the stitch, rather than several surrounding stitches on both sides.

== Standardization ==
One variant of the saddle stitch, with threads running parallel, rather than twisting, is designated stitch number 201 by ISO 4915:1991.
