= Swivel knife =

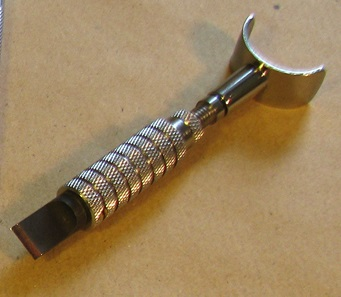
Swivel knife

A swivel knife is a chisel-edged blade held upright and mounted on a pivot with a saddle for a finger. It is held somewhat like a pencil, but between the thumb and middle fingers, while the forefinger rides in the saddle above. The saddle is free to rotate (hence the "swivel" name) and in more sophisticated models, may rotate on ball bearings.

The swivel knife is used to outline and cut a design into the surface of leather as an initial stage to tooling the leather with decorations. The blade is ground to a 30Deg. angle (both sides) to help the user control the depth of the incised line. The ground surfaces of the blade are to be polished to a mirror finish to facilitate the smooth movement through the cased leather surface. Detailed sharpening and honing directions are given in several instruction manuals on leather carving. The blade is held where the sides are perpendicular to the work, but with the cutting edge at a slight angle with the leading edge clear of the leather surface. In use, it is usually pulled toward the user with the fingers resting on the knurled barrel rotating the blade in the desired path. The other hand is usually used to steady and rotate the work as the incised line is cut. Very tight and graceful curves may be produced. In the early American West, much of the "tooled" designs on saddles, saddle bags ("cantenas", many with pistol holsters under the tooled flap), and the early "California" pattern revolver belt holsters, were ornamented solely with designs made with the swivel knife.

== See also ==
- Leather carving
- Leather crafting
- Leather tooling
