= Ken Griffin (saddler and magician) =

American cowboy, leather worker, magician, and author (1914–1988)

Ken Griffin (1914–1988) was a Western cowboy, leather worker, magician, and author. As a leatherworker, Griffin helped transition leathercraft from strictly a vocation to an accessible hobby through his work and teaching. As a magician, Griffin and his wife performed worldwide with The Ken Griffin Show.

== Leather artist career ==
Born in Jester, Oklahoma, Griffin grew up roping cattle, becoming familiar with horses and saddles from a young age. He began working at his first saddle shop under J.B. Williams at a saddlery in Deming, New Mexico, where he learned to make saddles, as well as tool and carve leather.

Ken found it more lucrative to stamp commissioned pieces rather than producing finished goods, so the majority of his work was on consignment from local leather shops.

Fascinated by the different regional techniques, Griffin would study catalogues from saddleries all over the country to gather ideas and blend styles. He pursued this variety, working at different saddle shops all over the Western United States, when he found himself at a saddlery in Flagstaff, Arizona. While there, he picked up some work helping with the horses on Howard Hughes’ The Outlaw, and ended up joining the crew back in Hollywood, California to finish the film.

While in Hollywood, Griffin worked for Ed Bohlin making saddles and leather piece work for films, later opening a shop specializing in quality hand carved goods. These custom pieces were featured in many of the Western motion pictures of the time, and Griffin was commissioned to make custom pieces for celebrities such as Roy Rogers, Gene Autry, Bill Elliot, and Robert Taylor.

Griffin began teaching and found that he was dissatisfied with the quality of learning resources available for students. He went on to produce a step-by-step instruction book on leather carving featuring photographs of the finished product, which was the first of its kind. During that time, Griffin began working with Dick McGahen of the Craftool Company, later acquired by Tandy Leather, where he designed tools and conceptualized the original “Doodle Pages”.

== The Ken Griffin Show ==
In 1946, Griffin and his wife Roberta decided to pursue another passion: magic. The Griffin family went on to tour the United States with a two-hour illusion and magic show, performing in theaters, auditoriums, and outdoor stages. All five of their children joined them on the road and worked the act. Their first show was called “NAVO & CLAYCHA", American Indian Magician”, with scenery, props, and costumes all in Native American design. In the early days of their traveling magic act, the show was not very lucrative, so Griffin would pick up a few days work at saddle shops along the road. His wife Roberta documented their travels by publishing a bi-monthly article in the magazine The Craftsman titled "Leather Skivings". As their show gained momentum, it was later changed to the Ken Griffin Show and toured internationally for over 20 years, including in eight USO tours.

In 1979, Ken and Roberta Griffin were both honored with the Academy of Magical Arts’ Award of Merit, as well as being the second recipients of the Al Stohlman Award for Achievement in Leathercraft in 1984.

== Works ==
- Ken Griffin (1949). The Art of Carving Leather. Craftool Co.
- Ken Griffin (1952). Ken Griffin's Scrap Book. Craftool Co.
- Ken & Roberta Griffin (1972). Illusion Show Know-How. The Abbott Magic Company.
- Ken & Roberta Griffin (1983). I want to be a magician. Creative Multigraphics.
- Ken & Roberta Griffin (1990). The Professional Entertainer's Booking & Selling Manual. The Abbott Magic Company.
