= Seeder =

Seeder may refer to:

- Seed drill, an agricultural device
- Seeder, a tool used in leather carving
- Seeder, see Seeding (computing)

== See also ==
- Seed (disambiguation)
