= David Levi (scholar) =

David Levi (1742 – 1801) was an English-Jewish writer, Hebraist, Jewish apologist, translator, and poet.

== Biography ==
Levi was born in London, to poor immigrant parents who could not afford to educate him. He worked as a shoemaker, then as a hatter, then as a printer. He read voraciously in Jewish literature from ancient times to the present, as well as in Christian writings about Judaism and about the Bible. Self-educated, he realised how little both Jews and Christians in England knew about Judaism and resolved to explain and defend his faith.

His first published work, A Succinct Account of the Rites and Ceremonies of the Jews (1782), tried to explain Judaism to Jews and to correct Christian misconceptions about Judaism. Next, he translated the prayer books of both the Ashkenazi and Spanish and Portuguese Jews. He supervised a translation of the Old Testament into English and published a Hebrew grammar and dictionary, and a guide to the Hebrew language.

In 1786, Joseph Priestley published his Letter to the Jews (1786), urging them to convert. Levi published a lengthy answer, which led to many arguments with Christian divines. This led to his three-volume Dissertation on the Prophecies of the Old Testament (1793–1800), which he printed and published himself. It was republished in London in 1817 in two volumes. Levi's work was well known in Christian circles; his Dissertation on the Prophecies was accepted as authoritative by many scholars, both Jewish and Christian, well into the nineteenth century.

His six-volume English translation of the liturgy served as the foundation for later editions published in England and in the United States.

His Protestant friend Henry Lemoine published an obituary in the Gentleman's Magazine (October 1801), "He's Gone! the Pride of Israel's Busy Tribe". It praised him as a great explainer and defender of Judaism against both Christians and sceptics.

Levi was also poet in ordinary to the synagogue, and furnished odes when required on several public celebrations, as, for instance, on the king's escape from assassination in 1795.
