= Al Stohlman Award for Achievement in Leathercraft =

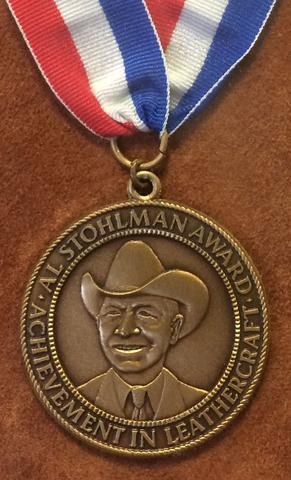
Al Stohlman Award for Achievement in Leathercraft

The Al Stohlman Award for Achievement in Leathercraft honors the accomplishments of individual leather workers worldwide for their continued dedication and exemplary service to leathercraft. The criteria for nominations are someone who has demonstrated continued devotion to the advancement of leathercraft, following the example of Al Stohlman, who is most well-known for publishing over 40 books, creating numerous pattern packs, and innovating many new tools for leatherworking.

Recipients of the medal are recognized based on their overall achievements in leathercraft. Considered criteria for an award nomination include a biological sketch, chronological listing of achievements, teaching history, public galleries, and innovative applications. This award is presented annually by the Al and Ann Stohlman Award Foundation at the various national leather trade shows.

== Past Award Winners ==
- 1983 – Paul Burnett
- 1984 – Roberta & Ken Griffin
- 1986 – Robb Barr
- 1986 – Bill Gomer
- 1987 – Robert "Bob" Beard
- 1988 – Kat Kuszak
- 1989 – Karla Van Horne
- 1991 – George Hurst
- 1992 – Ben Moody
- 1993 – Dick Giehl
- 1994 – Ava Ostrander
- 1995 – Beth Berry
- 1996 – Chuck Smith
- 1997 – Silva Fox
- 1998 – Don King
- 1998 – Peter Main
- 1999 – Tony Laier
- 2000 – Roz Kaohn
- 2001 – Jesse Smith
- 2002 – Jim Linnell
- 2003 – Jim Lind
- 2004 – Al Shelton
- 2004 – Bill & Dot Reis
- 2005 – Chan Geer
- 2006 – Verlane Desgrange
- 2007 – Pete Gorrell
- 2008 – Cherryl McIntyre
- 2009 – Al Gould
- 2010 – Bob Klenda
- 2011 – Don Butler
- 2012 – Kay Orton
- 2013 – Akiko Okada
- 2013 – Wayne Christensen
- 2015 – Bob Park
- 2016 - Kathy Flanagan
- 2017 - Serge Volken
- 2018 - Jim Jackson
- 2020 - Jürgen Volbach
- 2021 - G.K. Fraker
- 2021 - Michiko Matsuda
- 2022 - Chris "Slickbald" Andre
- 2023 - Annie Libertini
- 2024 - Barry King
- 2025 - Aaron Heizer
