= Henri Lemoine =

Henri or Henry Lemoine may refer to:

- Henri Lemoine (cyclist) (1909–1981), French cyclist
- Henri Lemoine (fraudster), French fraudster of the early 1900s

== See also ==
- Henry Lemoine (1786-1854), French piano teacher, music publisher, composer
- Henry Lemoine (writer) (1756–1812), English writer
