= Chapbook =

Short inexpensive booklet

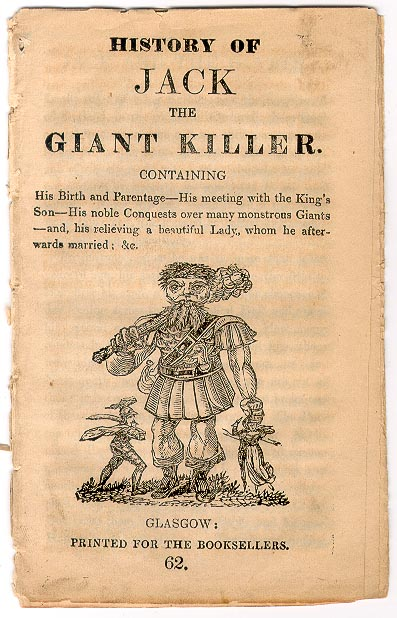
Chapbook (c. 1800) of Jack the Giant Killer

A chapbook is a type of small printed booklet that was a popular medium for street literature throughout early modern Europe. Chapbooks were usually produced cheaply, illustrated with crude woodcuts and printed on a single sheet folded into 8, 12, 16, or 24 pages, sometimes bound with a saddle stitch. Printers provided chapbooks on credit to chapmen, who sold them both from door to door and at markets and fairs, then paid the printers for the stock they sold. The tradition of chapbooks emerged during the 16th century as printed books were becoming affordable, with the medium ultimately reaching its height of popularity during the 17th and 18th centuries. Various ephemera and popular or folk literature were published as chapbooks, such as almanacs, children's literature, folklore, ballads, nursery rhymes, pamphlets, poetry, and political and religious tracts. The term chapbook remains in use by publishers to refer to short, inexpensive booklets.

== Terminology ==
The term 'chapbook' is first attested in English in 1824, and seemingly derives from 'chapman', the word for the itinerant salesmen who, after the invention of printing, would have included them among the wares he sold. The first element of 'chapman' comes in turn from Old English cēap 'barter', 'business', 'dealing', from which the modern adjective 'cheap' was ultimately derived.

What English calls 'chapbooks' correspond to Portuguese Cordel literature, and to French bibliothèque bleue 'blue library' literature, the latter often being produced wrapped in the cheap blue paper normally used only for wrapping packets of sugar. In German a chapbook is called a Volksbuch, a 'people's book', and in Spanish such publications were pliegos sueltos, or 'loose sheets', a reference to how they were each put together. The Russian equivalent are known as Lubok books.

== History ==
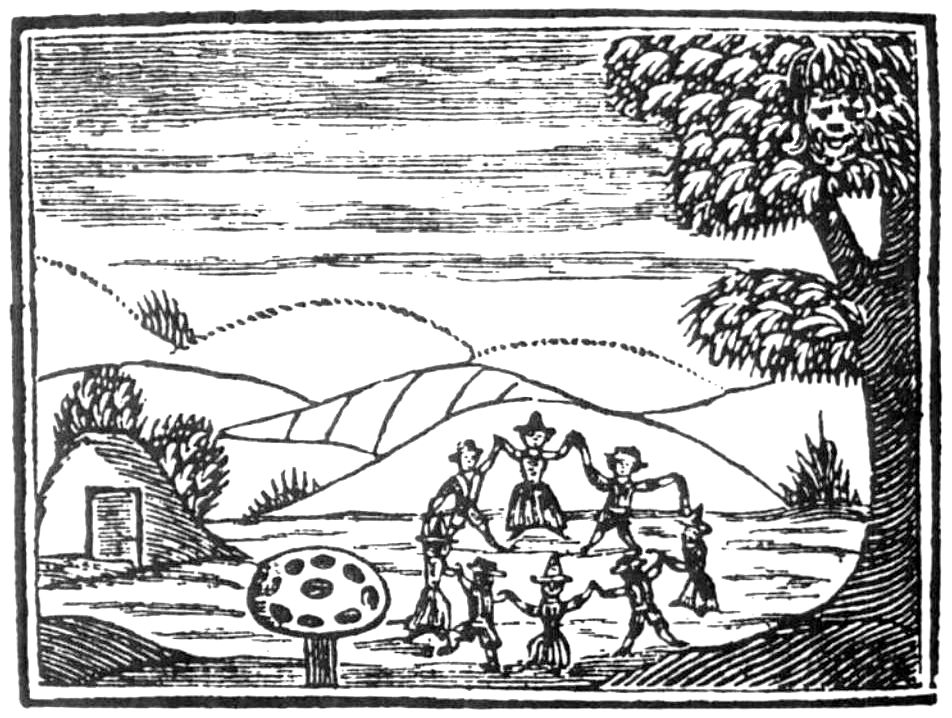
Woodcut of a fairy-circle from a 17th-century chapbook

Broadside ballads were popular songs, sold for a penny or halfpenny in the streets of towns and villages around Britain between the 16th and the early 20th centuries. They preceded chapbooks but had similar content, marketing, and distribution systems. There are records from Cambridgeshire as early as in 1553 of a man offering a scurrilous ballad "maistres mass" at an alehouse, and a pedlar selling "lytle books" to people, including a patcher of old clothes in 1578. These sales are probably characteristic of the market for chapbooks.

The form factor originated in Britain, but was also used in North America. Chapbooks gradually disappeared from the mid-19th century in the face of competition from cheap newspapers and, especially in Scotland, from tract societies that regarded them as ungodly.

Chapbooks were generally aimed at buyers who did not maintain libraries, and due to their flimsy construction they rarely survive as individual items. In an era when paper was expensive, chapbooks were sometimes used for wrapping, baking, or as toilet paper. Many of the surviving chapbooks come from the collections of Samuel Pepys between 1661 and 1688 which are now held at Magdalene College, Cambridge. The antiquary Anthony Wood also collected 65 chapbooks, including 20 from before 1660, which are now in the Bodleian Library. There are also significant Scottish collections, such as those held by the University of Glasgow and the National Library of Scotland.

Modern collectors such as Peter Opie, have chiefly a scholarly interest in the form. Modern small literary presses, such as Louffa Press, Black Lawrence Press and Ugly Duckling Presse, continue to issue several small editions of chapbooks a year, updated in technique and materials, often to high fabrication standards, such as letterpress.

== Production and distribution ==
Chapbooks were cheap, anonymous publications that were the usual reading material for lower-class people who could not afford books. Members of the upper classes occasionally owned chapbooks, and sometimes bound them in leather. Printers typically tailored their texts for the popular market. Chapbooks were usually between four and twenty-four pages long, and produced on rough paper with crude, frequently recycled, woodcut illustrations. Millions of chapbooks were sold each year. After 1696, English chapbook peddlers had to be licensed, and 2,500 of them were then authorized, 500 in London alone. In France, there were 3,500 licensed colporteurs by 1848, and they sold 40 million books annually.

The centre of the chapbook and ballad production was London, and printers were based around London Bridge until the Great Fire of London in 1666. Still, a feature of the emergence of chapbooks is the proliferation of provincial printers, especially in Scotland and Newcastle upon Tyne. The first Scottish publication was the tale of Tom Thumb, in 1682.

== Content ==
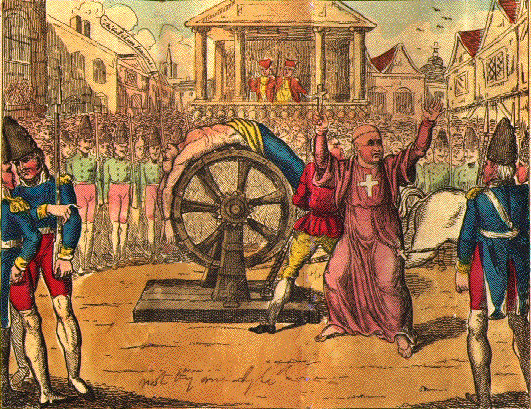
The frontispiece of a late 18th-century chapbook edition of Voltaire's The Extraordinary Tragical Fate of Calas, depicting Jean Calas being broken on the wheel

Chapbooks were an important medium for the dissemination of popular culture to the common people, especially in rural areas. They were a medium of entertainment and information. Though the content of chapbooks has been criticized as unsophisticated narratives which were heavily loaded with repetition and emphasized adventure through mostly anecdotal structures, they are valued as a record of popular culture, preserving cultural artefacts that may not survive in any other form.

Chapbooks were priced for sales to workers, although their market was not limited to the working classes. Broadside ballads were sold for a halfpenny, or a few pence. Prices of chapbooks were from 2d. to 6d., when agricultural labourers' wages were 12d. per day. The literacy rate in England in the 1640s was around 30 percent for males and rose to 60 percent in the mid-18th century. Many working people were readers, if not writers, and pre-industrial working patterns provided periods during which they could read.

Chapbooks were used for reading to family groups or groups in alehouses. They contributed to the development of literacy, and there is evidence of their use by autodidacts. In the 1660s, as many as 400,000 almanacs were printed annually, enough for one family in three in England. One 17th-century publisher of chapbooks in London stocked one book for every 15 families in the country. In the 1520s the Oxford bookseller John Dorne noted in his day-book selling up to 190 ballads a day at a halfpenny each. The probate inventory of the stock of Charles Tias, of The sign of the Three Bibles on London Bridge, in 1664 included books and printed sheets to make approximately 90,000 chapbooks (including 400 reams of paper) and 37,500 ballad sheets. This was not regarded as an outstanding figure in the trade. The inventory of Josiah Blare, of The Sign of the Looking Glass on London Bridge, in 1707 listed 31,000 books, plus 257 reams of printed sheets. A conservative estimate of sales in Scotland alone in the second half of the 18th century was over 200,000 per year.

Printers provided chapbooks on credit to chapmen, who sold them both from door to door and at markets and fairs, then paying for the stock they sold. This facilitated wide distribution and large sales with minimum outlay, and also provided the printers with feedback about what titles were most popular. Popular works were reprinted, pirated, edited, and produced in different editions.

Publishers also issued catalogues, and chapbooks are found in the libraries of provincial yeomen and gentry. John Whiting, a Quaker yeoman imprisoned at Ilchester, Somerset, in the 1680s had books sent by carrier from London, and left for him at an inn.

Samuel Pepys had a collection of ballads bound into volumes, under the following classifications, into which could fit the subject matter of most chapbooks:

1. Devotion and Morality
2. History – true and fabulous
3. Tragedy: viz. Murders, executions, and judgments of God
4. State and Times
5. Love – pleasant
6. Ditto – unpleasant
7. Marriage, Cuckoldry, &c.
8. Sea – love, gallantry & actions
9. Drinking and good fellowship
10. Humour, frollicks and mixt.

Stories in many chapbooks have much earlier origins. Bevis of Hampton was an Anglo-Norman romance of the 13th century, which probably drew on earlier themes. The structure of The Seven Sages of Rome was of Eastern origin, and was used by Geoffrey Chaucer. Many jests about ignorant and greedy clergy in chapbooks were taken from The Friar and the Boy printed about 1500 by Wynkyn de Worde, and The Sackfull of News (1557).

Historical stories set in a mythical and fantastical past were popular, while many significant historical figures and events appear rarely or not at all: in the Pepys collection, Charles I, and Oliver Cromwell do not appear as historical figures, The Wars of the Roses and the English Civil War do not appear at all, Elizabeth I appears only once, and Henry VIII and Henry II appear in disguise, standing up for the right with cobblers and millers and then inviting them to court and rewarding them. There was a pattern of high born heroes overcoming reduced circumstances by valour, such as Saint George, Guy of Warwick, Robin Hood, and heroes of low birth who achieve status through force of arms, such as Clim of Clough, and William of Cloudesley. Clergy often appear as figures of fun, and foolish countrymen were also popular (e.g., The Wise Men of Gotham). Other works were aimed at regional and rural audience (e.g., The Country Mouse and the Town Mouse).

From 1597, works were published that were aimed at specific trades, such as cloth merchants, weavers and shoemakers. The latter were commonly literate. Thomas Deloney, a weaver, wrote Thomas of Reading, about six clothiers from Reading, Gloucester, Worcester, Exeter, Salisbury and Southampton, traveling together and meeting at Basingstoke their fellows from Kendal, Manchester and Halifax. In his Jack of Newbury, set during Henry VIII's reign, an apprentice to a broadcloth weaver takes over his business and marries his widow on his death. On achieving success, he is liberal to the poor and refuses a knighthood for his substantial services to the king.

Other examples from the Pepys collection include The Countryman's Counsellor, or Everyman his own Lawyer, and Sports and Pastimes, written for schoolboys, including magic tricks, like how to "fetch a shilling out of a handkerchief", write invisibly, make roses out of paper, snare wild duck, and make a maid-servant fart uncontrollably.

The provinces and Scotland had their own local heroes. Robert Burns commented that one of the first two books he read in private was "the history of Sir William Wallace ... poured a Scottish prejudice in my veins which will boil along there till the flood-gates of life shut in eternal rest".

== Influence ==
Chapbooks had a wide and continuing influence. Eighty percent of English folk songs collected by early-20th-century collectors have been linked to printed broadsides, including over 90 of which could only be derived from those printed before 1700. It has been suggested the majority of surviving ballads can be traced to 1550–1600 by internal evidence.

One of the most popular and influential chapbooks was Richard Johnson's Seven Champions of Christendom (1596), believed to be the source for the introduction of Saint George into English folk plays.

Robert Greene's 1588 novel Dorastus and Fawnia, the basis of Shakespeare's The Winter's Tale, was still being published in cheap editions in the 1680s. Some stories were still being published in the 19th century, (e.g., Jack of Newbury, Friar Bacon, Dr Faustus and The Seven Champions of Christendom).

== Later production ==
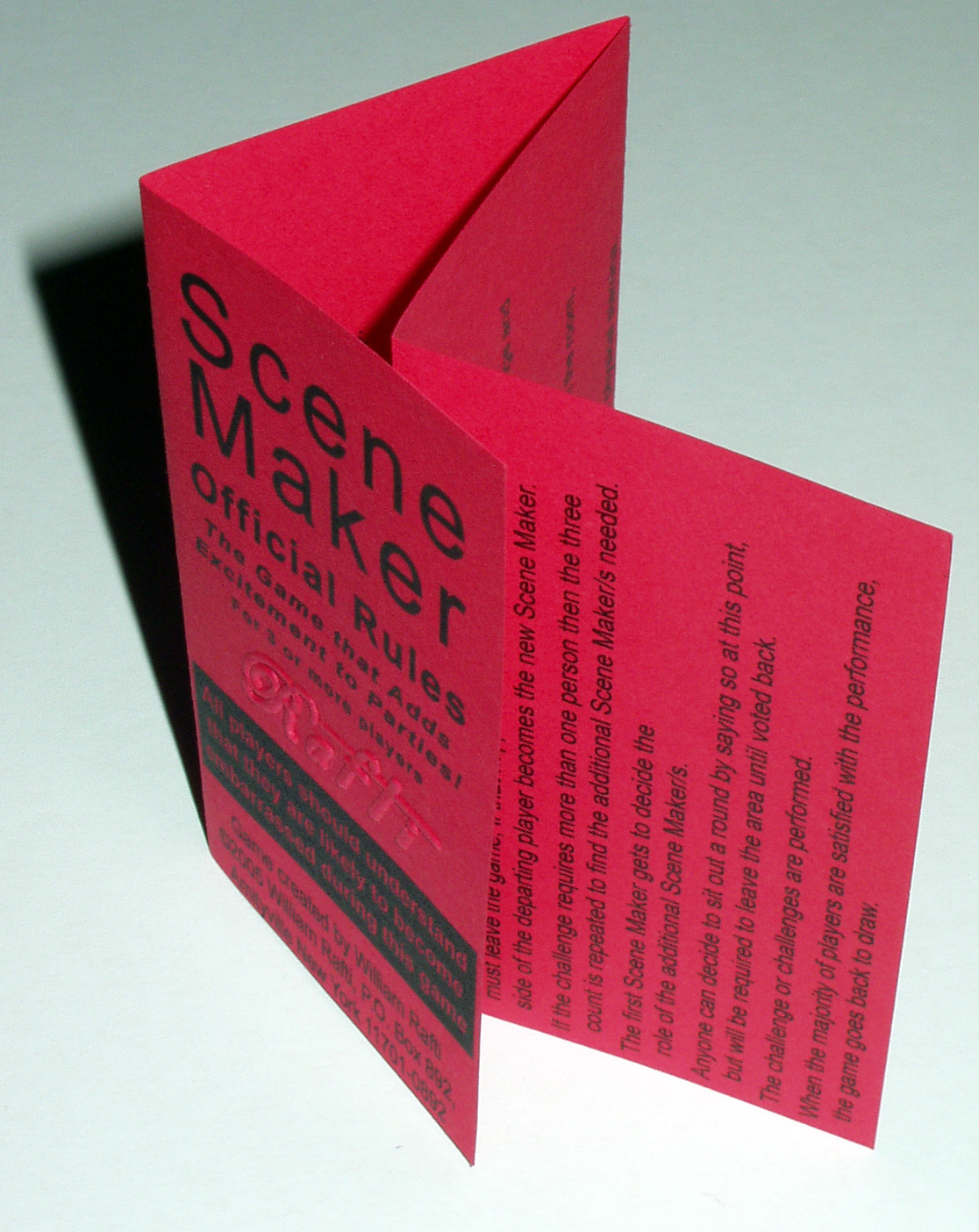
A modern chapbook

Chapbook is also a term currently used to denote publications of up to about 40 pages, usually poetry bound with some form of saddle stitch, though many are perfect bound, folded, or wrapped. These publications range from low-cost productions to finely produced, hand-made editions that may sell to collectors for hundreds of dollars. More recently, the popularity of fiction and non-fiction chapbooks has also increased. In the UK they are more often referred to as pamphlets.

The genre has been revitalized in the past 40 years by the widespread availability of first mimeograph technology, then low-cost copy centres and digital printing, and by the cultural revolutions spurred by both zines and poetry slams, the latter generating hundreds upon hundreds of self-published chapbooks that are used to fund tours. The Center for the Humanities at the City University of New York Graduate Center has held the NYC/CUNY Chapbook Festival, focused on "the chapbook as a work of art, and as a medium for alternative and emerging writers and publishers." For example, Lucia Berlin's story "Manual for Cleaning Women" was first published as a chapbook; Berlin published it later as part of a collection that became a bestseller.

== Collections ==
- The National Library of Scotland holds a large collection of Scottish chapbooks; approximately 4,000 of an estimated total of 15,000 published – including several in Lowland Scots and Gaelic. Records for most Scottish chapbooks have been catalogued online. Approximately 3,000 of these have been digitized and can be accessed from the Library's Digital Gallery. A project is underway to add every chapbook in the collection to Wikisource called WikiProject NLS.
- The Glasgow University Library has over 1,000 examples throughout the collections, searchable online via the Scottish Chapbooks Catalogue of c. 4,000 works, which covers the Lauriston Castle collection, Edinburgh City libraries and Stirling University. The University of South Carolina's G. Ross Roy Collection is collaborating in research for the Scottish Chapbook Project.
- The Bodleian Library of the University of Oxford has over 30,000 ballads in several major collections. The original printed materials range from the 16th to the 20th century. The Broadside Ballads project makes the digitized copies of the sheets and ballads available.
- Sir Frederick Madden's Collection of Broadside Ballads, at Cambridge University Library, is possibly the largest collection from London and provincial presses between 1775 and 1850, with earlier 18th-century garlands and Irish volumes.
- The Lilly Library, Indiana University has 1,900 chapbooks from England, Scotland, Ireland, France, and the United States, which were part of the Elisabeth W. Ball collection. Online search facility
- Rutgers University, Special Collections and University Archives houses the Harry Bischoff Weiss collection of 18th- and 19th-century chapbooks, illustrated with catchpenny prints.
- The John Rylands University Library at University of Manchester contains 600 items in The Sharpe Collection of chapbooks, formed by Charles Kirkpatrick Sharpe. These are 19th-century items printed in Scotland and Newcastle upon Tyne.
- Literatura de Cordel Brazilian Chapbook Collection Library of Congress, American Folklife Center has a collection of over 7200 works of cordel literature. Descended from the medieval troubadour and chapbook tradition of cordel literature has been published in Brazil for over a century.
- The Archival and Special Collections at the University of Guelph Library has a collection of more than 550 chapbooks in its extensive Scottish holdings.
- The National Art Library, Victoria & Albert Museum in London has a collection of approximately 800 chapbooks, all catalogued.
- The McGill University Library has over 900 British and American chapbooks published in the 18th and 19th centuries. The chapbooks have been digitized and can be read online.
- The Grupo de investigación sobre relaciones de sucesos (siglos XVI–XVIII) en la Península Ibérica, Universidade da Coruña Catalog and Digital Library of "Relaciones de sucesos" (16th–18th centuries). Bibliographical database of more than 5,000 chap-books, pamphlets, Early modern press news, etc. Facsimilar reproduction of many of the copies: Catálogo y Biblioteca Digital de Relaciones de Sucesos (siglos XVI–XVIII)
- The Ball State University Digital Media Repository Chapbooks collection provides online access to 173 chapbooks from the 19th and 20th centuries.
- The Elizabeth Nesbitt Room, University of Pittsburgh
- Cambridge Digital Library hosts a growing number of digital facsimiles of Spanish chapbooks from the collections of Cambridge University Library and the British Library.
- The Biblioteca Nacional de España has a digitized collection of chapbooks.
- The project Untangling the cordel offers a collection of almost 1000 pliegos de cordel, the Spanish equivalent of English chapbooks, kept at the University Library of the University of Geneva.
- Mapping Pliegos is a portal dedicated to 19th-century Spanish chapbook literature. It brings together the digitized collections of over a dozen partner libraries.

== See also ==
- Gothic bluebooks
- Penny dreadful
- Reclam
- Špalíček (ballet)
- Zine
