= Gothic bluebooks =

Gothic bluebooks were short forms of gothic fiction popular in the late 18th century and early 19th century.

== Description ==
Examples of this form of fiction are now rare, surviving only in a few collections. One of the collections where a number of gothic bluebooks have been preserved is the Corvey Library.

Gothic bluebooks were descendants of the chapbook, trade in which had nearly disappeared by 1800. They measured about three and a half to four inches wide and six to seven inches high. Many of the bluebooks contained outright plagiarism, being merely plot summaries of full-length gothic novels. Almost all were abridgements of full-length gothic novels, usually without change of the title or characters' names from the original. Gothic bluebooks were usually either thirty-six or seventy-two pages long, selling for either sixpence or a shilling respectively. It is from their price that they derived the nicknames, "Shilling Shockers" and "Sixpenny Shockers". While full-length gothic novels written by authors like Horace Walpole, Matthew Lewis, and Ann Radcliffe were expensive, these "Sixpenny Shockers" were affordable versions of the same stories. These short forms of the Gothic were not popular with critics, with some deeming them as the toxic literary waste of their time period.

Like the gothic novel, gothic bluebooks fell into two general groups. One featured a background with a monastery or convent, following novels like The Monk or The Italian, and the other group featured the gothic castle, following novels such as The Castle of Otranto and The Mysteries of Udolpho. One of the reasons for the appeal of these abridgements was their ability to tell the same story as a three to four volume novel in 36 or 72 pages, successfully bringing the characters to the altar or to the grave. The fiction was highly predictable, and readers could hardly miss the point of the story because the narration was straightforward. Given their reasonable prices, they were said to have been sold by 'every other bookseller in the United Kingdom' and therefore, readily available.

Gothic bluebooks lured the consumer with engravings and woodcuts on their title pages and frontispieces; these illustrations were often fearsome, with a prototypical image being that of a maiden in flight down a dark path glancing over her shoulder. It was common for these books to have two titles, with the first highlighting the love interest and the second emphasizing the horrid element. An example is the title, "A Gothic Romance: The Cavern of Horrors".

Important publishers of gothic bluebooks, who often referred to the works as "pamphlets", included Thomas Tegg, Dean and Munday, Robert Harrild, and John Aliss, who each had distribution networks throughout Britain. If a bluebook story was not long enough to fill the allotted page length, publishers had versions of shorter stories on hand that they would attach to the end. One story that was commonly attached was "Mary, A Fragment", which was just one page long. Gothic bluebooks remained a popular trade through the first decade of the 19th century.

== Popularity among writers ==
From autobiographies, it appears that gothic bluebooks were read by writers like Percy Shelley, Robert Southey, and Sheridan Le Fanu in their youth. One of Percy Shelley's childhood friends, Thomas Medwin, said of Shelley,

He was very fond of reading, and greedily devoured all the books which were brought to school after the holidays; these were mostly blue books. Who does not know what blue books mean? But if there should be any one ignorant enough not to know what those dear darling volumes, so designated from their covers, contain, be it known, that they are or were to be bought for sixpence, and embodied stories of haunted castles, bandits, murderers, and other grim personages – a most exciting and interesting sort of food for boys' minds.

== See also ==
- Gothic fiction
- Chap-book
