= Al Shelton =

American businessman

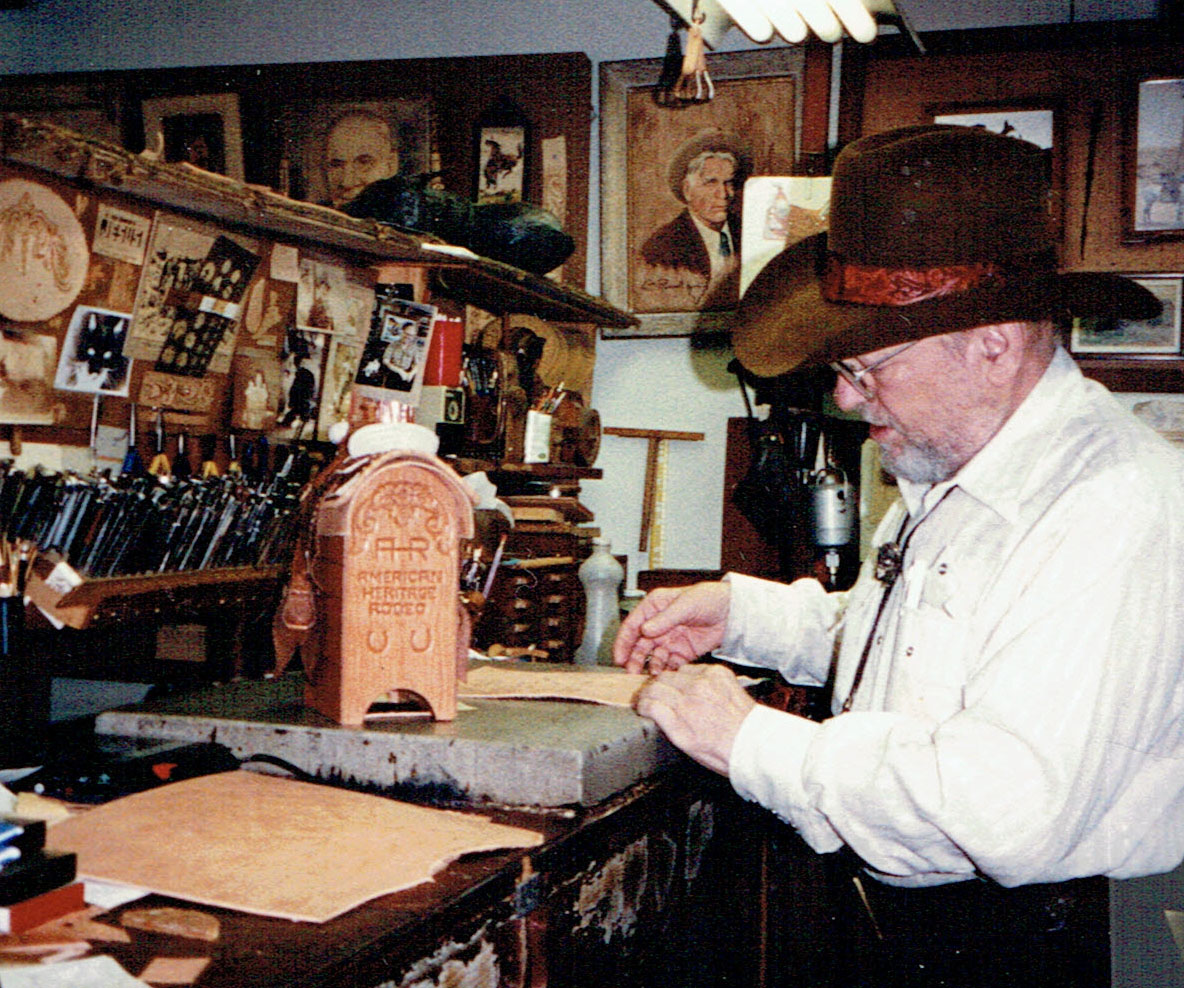
Al Shelton working at his bench

Al Shelton (June 27, 1920 – March 22, 2016) established the reputation of “Cowboy Artist to the Stars”, creating custom-crafted leatherwork embossed with iconic cowpoke imagery in his workshop on Ventura Boulevard. Among his regular clientele was Steve McQueen, Ronald Reagan, Clark Gable, and many others. Several of his pieces of are featured at the Autry Museum of the American West.

Al Shelton's interest in leather carving began while working as a cowboy in his teens during the tail end of the depression. The parade saddles he would come across featured intricate designs and Shelton attempted to decorate his own saddle in an attempt he said was “ever so humble, hopeless!”

Shelton spent the next decade learning and refining his craft, working at different saddle shops across the Western United States. In the late ‘40s, Shelton moved to Los Angeles and set up shop in the Los Angeles Farmers Market, where hundreds of sight seers daily would watch him work. As his business evolved, he was commissioned to design several patterns and tools for Craftool and began teaching classes as the Pacific Arts and Crafts.

Following a five-year stint working with Nudie Cohn, Shelton set up his own shop just as the TV westerns were taking off. At this workshop on Ventura Boulevard, Shelton spent the next 50 years creating leather belts, guitar cases, director chairs, and a wide variety of other bespoke leather goods for the Hollywood elite. In 2004, Shelton's industry contributions were recognized with an Al Stohlman Award for Achievement in Leathercraft.
