= Leather carving =

Craft practice

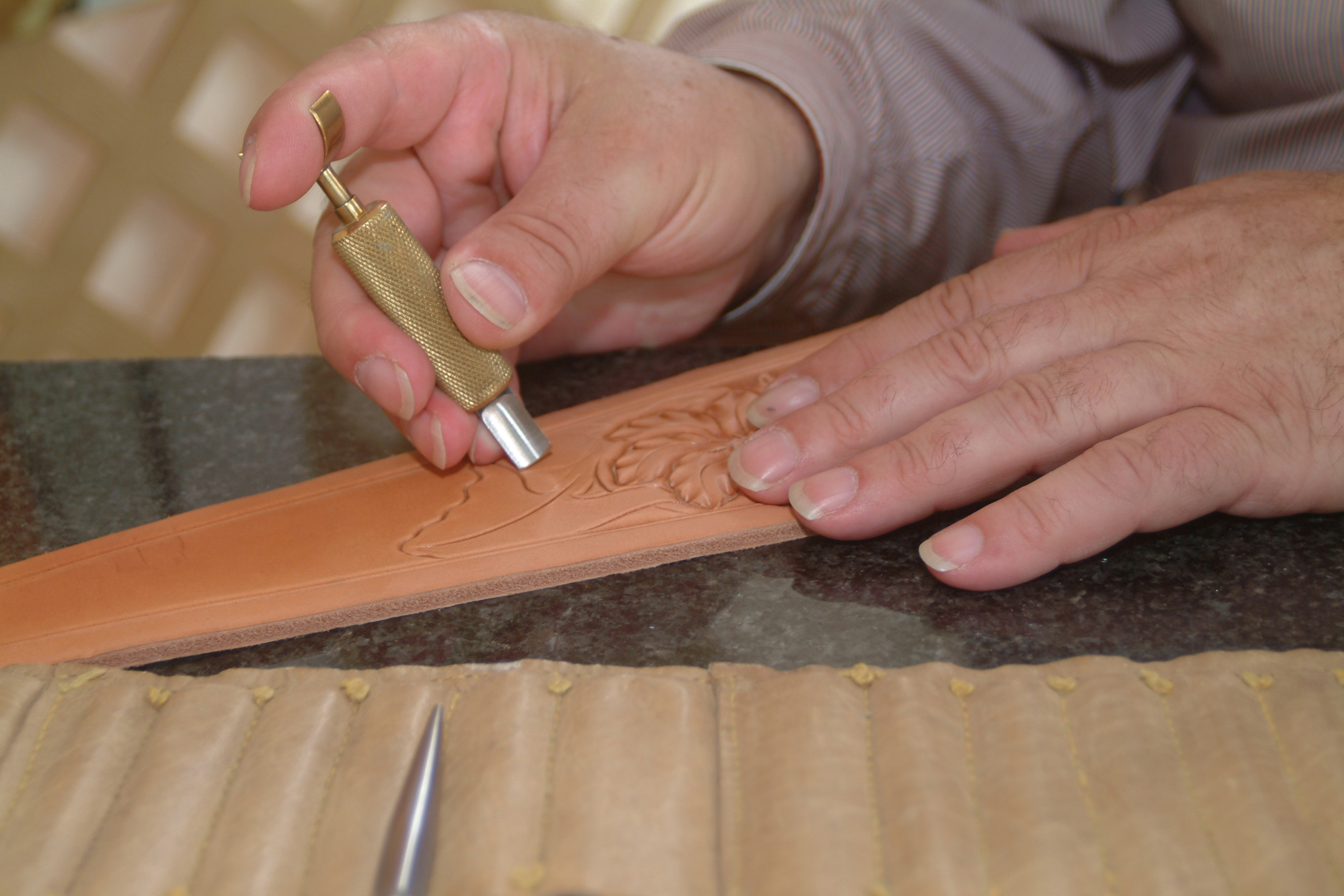
Leather carving using a swivel knife

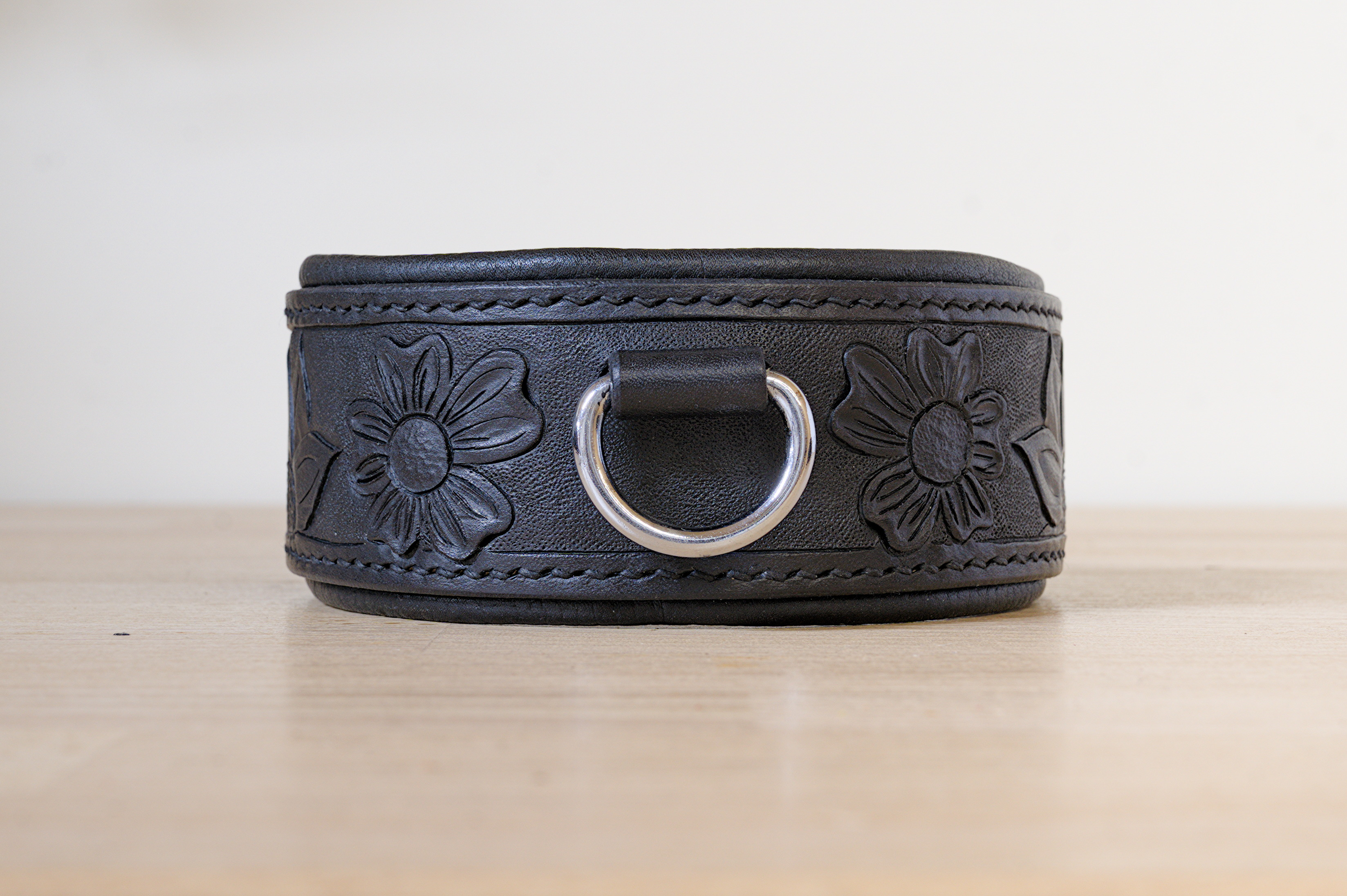
Leather carving on a BDSM collar

Leather carving is the process of giving a three-dimensional appearance to leather craft objects or works of art by cutting and stamping the surface. Many different kinds of leathers can be used for these crafts.

== Materials ==
The only type of leather suitable for carving is vegetable tanned, full grain leather. This is because the vegetable tanning process allows the leather to absorb water, which is used to soften the leather before the carving process, and the grain of the leather is necessary to allow the leather to hold the shape after the carving process is complete. Other leathers lack these two essential qualities. While the process of cutting into the leather and pushing the edges of the cuts in is relatively modern, marking wet leather has been around since the Roman period. There are some examples of Roman leather at Vindolanda near Hadrian's wall and the book "Purses in Pieces" is very informative with some lovely examples of medieval carved leather work. Historically, tools for stamping leather would probably have been made out of bone, but would not have been too different from those used today.

== Tools ==
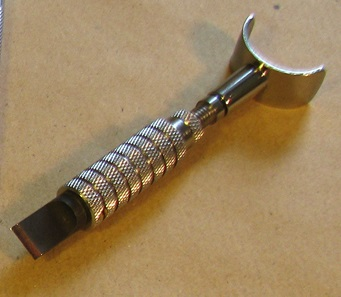
Swivel knife

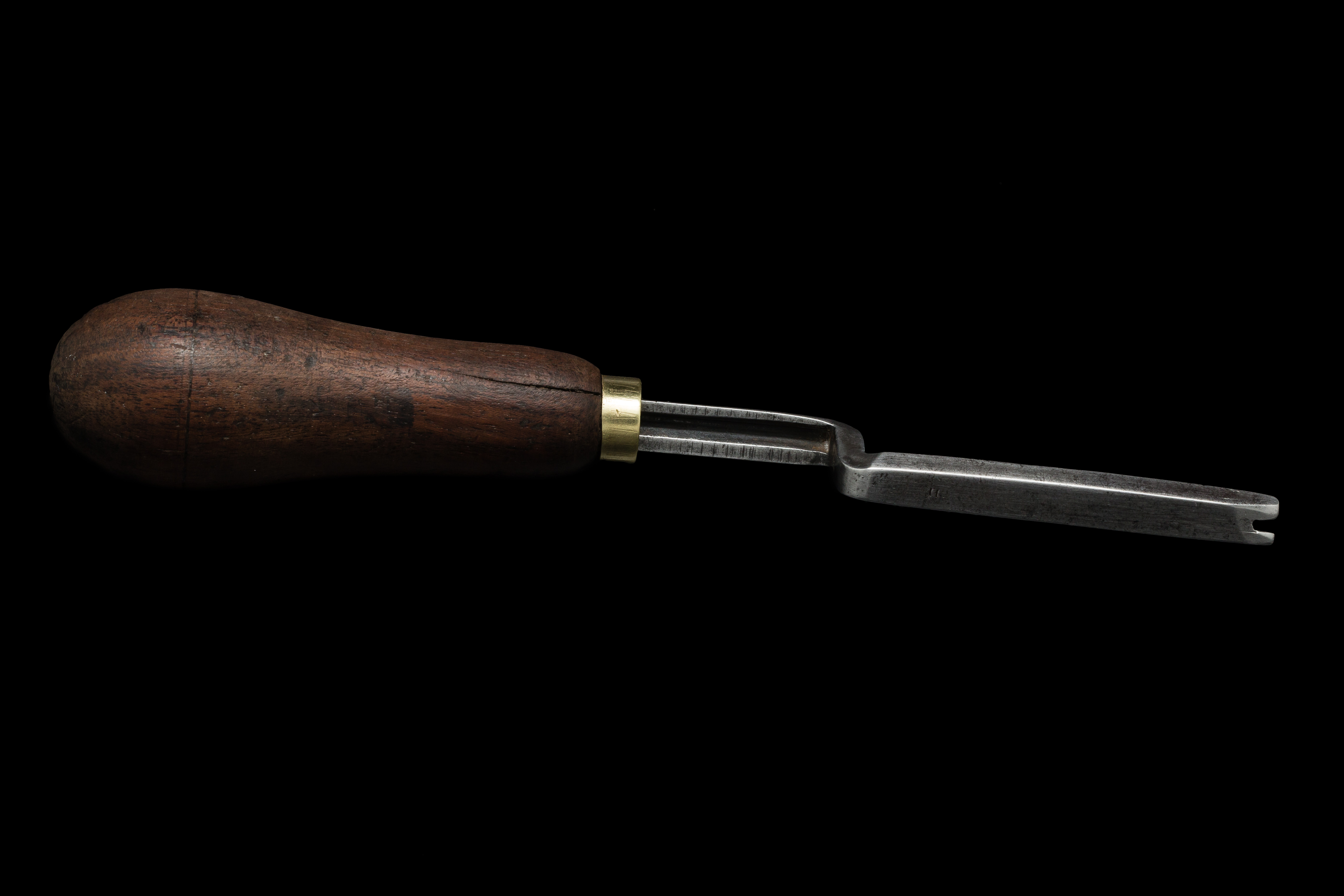
Beveler for blunting the corners of a piece of leather

Three main tools are used in leather carving:

- Swivel knife — used to make the bold cuts that define the pattern or image being carved.
- Stamp set — A set of stamping tools used to shape and color the leather to create the final image. Usually contains at minimum a beveler, pear shader, seeder, and background tool, but sets often contain other tools and sometimes several variations on the same tool.
- Rawhide mallet — used to drive the stamps used to mat down the background and create shading and patterns.

=== Stamping tools ===
==== Camouflage tool ====
This tool, which creates an impression similar to that of a sea shell, is used to add emphasis to areas of a carving, often in the stem or down the centre of a leaf in a floral design. It is used in a similar way to other stamping tools, by holding it vertically over the leather and striking with the rawhide mallet. When using the Camouflage tool, the impressions created should be equally spaced, starting from the centre of the design and working out towards the tips of the stems or leaves in the design. The impressions should get progressively lighter.

==== Pear shader ====
The Pear shader is used to press down areas of the design that need to appear curved. The action of the pear shader causes the leather tooled by it to appear slightly darker. The pear shader is slightly unusual in that it may be tilted during use to provide the desired effect. It should be moved only slightly between each tap with the mallet so that it creates a consistent shading of the leather.

==== Beveler ====
This tool is used to create an indentation on one side of a cut so that one side is raised. This tool, when used correctly, can produce very realistic results. There are many variations of this tool that include a variety of shapes, such as diamonds or ovals. There are also a variety of faces that include striped, checked, rounded, smoothed, and crosshatched

==== Veiner or shell tool ====
These tools create a curved impression of a series of short, closely spaced lines. They may be used interchangeably, the only difference being that the veiner creates a simple curved line, while the shell tool has a pattern resembling the edge of a scallop along the inside edge. They are used to continue to create the impression of depth created by the beveler, and to create the impression of a curved surface. These tools are used in the usual way, but like the pear shader, may also be tilted to help create the impression of depth where they are used beside a cut.

==== Seeder ====
The seeder is predominantly used in floral designs to represent the seeds in the center of a flower, hence the name. Similar to other stamp-type tools, it is held vertically over the leather and struck with a wooden or rawhide mallet to create an impression in the surface of the leather. The seeder creates a small circular impression, often similar to an asterisk with a hole in the center.

==== Background tool ====
This step in producing a carved leather article is used to emphasise the design, and is not even necessary in some cases. It consists of the pushing down of any areas of leather that have not been already carved. The background tool has a crosshatched pattern on its head, which has the effect of significantly darkening the leather it is used on. As with the seeder, the face of this tool is often small, so care must be taken not to strike it too hard.

When using this tool, take care that the impressions created by it do not overlap, and also take care not to stamp into the design or over the border. When the entire face of the tool is not needed, or to create tidy corners, the tool can be tilted so only part of the face creates an impression.

== Method ==
All leather needs to be prepared a certain way for leather carvers to carve the leather. The leather carver will "case" the leather by soaking it in water, then letting it dry to the proper dampness, thus making the leather easier to tool. If the leather is too dry, impressions will fade over time, or will not be made to a consistent depth. Too wet, it will not hold a sharply defined carving. Properly cased leather feels cool to the touch, and has the feel, of firm, wet clay. A damp sponge can be used to maintain the dampness while tooling but should never be used to replace proper casing.

=== Swivel knife cuts ===
When the leather has been properly cased, the swivel knife is used to make the bold cuts that form the backbone of the carved image. These cuts are made to a depth of up to approximately half the thickness of the leather being used, depending on the effect desired by the leather worker. Care must be taken during this step to keep the swivel knife vertical at all times, as any tilt is detrimental to the ability of the leather to be properly stamped later in the carving process.

Veiners, Seeders, and other Specific Tooling

Various other tools may be needed to add details to the carving depending on the pattern. Here is where the carver can add character, especially to floral carving.

=== Beveling ===
After shading is completed with the Pear Shader, the Beveler is used to compress one side of the cut. This creates the impression of depth by pressing down parts of the image relative to the foreground. The Beveler is used by holding it vertically, with the foot of the tool in contact with the leather, and striking it lightly with the rawhide mallet. The tool is then moved forward along the cut about half its width, and struck again with the mallet. This process is completed until the entire length of the cut has been appropriately beveled.

As a general rule, the outside of curves and the outside edge of anything overlapping another part of the design is beveled. The exception to this rule is leather that will later be stamped with another tool, and, if the background is to be treated with the background tool, the background itself.

=== Decorative cuts ===
This is the final step in creating a carved design. The swivel knife is again used to create small, decorative cuts in the design to enhance its appearance. These cuts may be made in parts of the design that have already been stamped, which is why it is necessary to leave this step until last.
