= Pricking iron =

In leathercraft, a pricking iron is a handheld tool resembling a fork that is used to create dimples in leather a fixed distance apart that can then be pierced with an awl and stitched. A pricking iron is different from a leather chisel in that a chisel is designed to pierce the holes, not just mark their position, and does not require follow-up with an awl.
