= History of feminism =

Chronological narrative of the movements and ideologies aimed at equal rights for women

The history of feminism comprises the narratives (chronological or thematic) of the movements and ideologies which have aimed at equal rights for women. While feminists around the world have differed in causes, goals, and intentions depending on time, culture, and country, most Western feminist historians assert that all movements that work to obtain women's rights should be considered feminist movements, even when they did not (or do not) apply the term to themselves. Some other historians limit the term "feminist" to the modern feminist movement and its progeny, and use the label "protofeminist" to describe earlier movements.

Modern Western feminist history is conventionally split into time periods, or "waves", each with slightly different aims based on prior progress:

- First-wave feminism of the 19th and early 20th centuries focused on overturning legal inequalities, particularly addressing issues of women's suffrage
- Second-wave feminism (1960s–1980s) broadened debate to include cultural inequalities, gender norms, and the role of women in society
- Third-wave feminism (1990s–2000s) refers to diverse strains of feminist activity, seen by third-wavers themselves both as a continuation of the second wave and as a response to its perceived failures
- Fourth-wave feminism (early 2010s–present) expands on the third wave's focus on intersectionality, emphasizing body positivity, trans-inclusivity, and an open discourse about rape culture in the social media era

Although the "waves" construct has been commonly used to describe the history of feminism, the concept has also been criticized by non-White feminists for ignoring and erasing the history between the "waves", by choosing to focus solely on a few famous figures, on the perspective of a white bourgeois woman and on popular events, and for being racist and colonialist.

== Early feminism ==
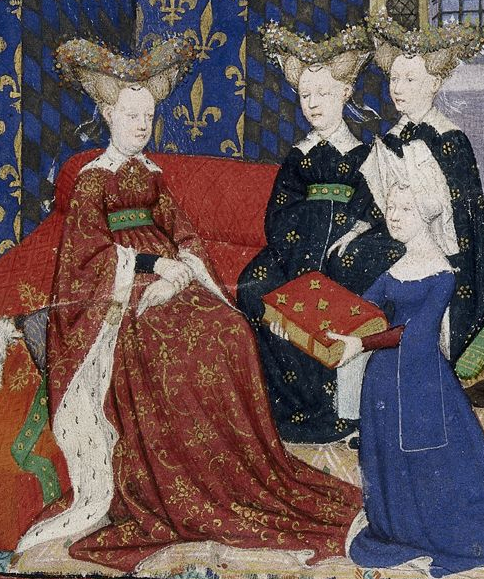
Christine de Pizan presents her book to Queen Isabeau of Bavaria.

People and activists who discuss or advance women's equality prior to the existence of the feminist movement are sometimes labeled as protofeminist. Some scholars criticize this term because they believe it diminishes the importance of earlier contributions or that feminism does not have a single begin or linear history as implied by terms such as protofeminist or postfeminist.

Around 24 centuries ago, Plato, according to Elaine Hoffman Baruch, "[argued] for the total political and sexual equality of women, advocating that they be members of his highest class, ... those who rule and fight".

Andal, a female Tamil saint, lived around the 7th or 8th century. She is well known for writing Tiruppavai. Andal has inspired women's groups such as Goda Mandali. Her divine marriage to Vishnu is viewed by some as a feminist act, as it allowed her to avoid the regular duties of being a wife and gain autonomy. In the 12th century, the Waldensians Christian sect espoused some feminist ideas.

=== Renaissance Feminism ===
Italian-French writer Christine de Pizan (1364 – c. 1430), the author of The Book of the City of Ladies and Epître au Dieu d'Amour (Epistle to the God of Love) is cited by Simone de Beauvoir as the first woman to denounce misogyny and write about the relation of the sexes. Christine de Pizan also wrote one of the early fictional accounts of gender transition in Le Livre de la mutation de fortune. Other early feminist writers include the 16th-century writers Heinrich Cornelius Agrippa, Modesta di Pozzo di Forzi, and Jane Anger, and the 17th-century writers Hannah Woolley in England, Juana Inés de la Cruz in Mexico, Marie Le Jars de Gournay, Anne Bradstreet, Anna Maria van Schurman and François Poullain de la Barre. The emergence of women as true intellectuals effected change also in Italian humanism. Cassandra Fedele was the first woman to join a humanist group and achieved much despite greater constraints on women.

Renaissance defenses of women are present in a variety of literary genre and across Europe with a central claim of equality. Feminists appealed to principles that progressively lead to discourse of economic property injustice themes. Feminizing society was a way for women at this time to use literature to create interdependent and non-hierarchical systems that provided opportunities for both women and men.

Men have also played an important role in the history of defending that women are capable and able to compete equally with men, including Antonio Cornazzano, Vespasiano da Bisticci, and Giovanni Sabadino degli Arienti. Castiglione continues this trend of defending woman's moral character and that traditions are at fault for the appearance of women's inferiority. However, the critique is that there is no advocacy for social change, leaving her out of the political sphere, and abandoning her to traditional domestic roles. Although, many of them would encourage that if women were to be included in the political sphere it would be a natural consequence of their education. In addition, some of these men state that men are at fault for the lack of knowledge of intellectual women by leaving them out of historical records.

One of the most important 17th-century feminist writers in the English language was Margaret Cavendish, Duchess of Newcastle-upon-Tyne. Her knowledge was recognized by some, such as protofeminist Bathsua Makin, who wrote that "The present Dutchess of New-Castle, by her own Genius, rather than any timely Instruction, over-tops many grave Grown-Men," and considered her a prime example of what women could become through education.

=== 17th century ===
Margaret Fell's most famous work is "Women's Speaking Justified", a scripture-based argument for women's ministry, and one of the major texts on women's religious leadership in the 17th century. In this short pamphlet, Fell based her argument for equality of the sexes on one of the basic premises of Quakerism, namely spiritual equality. Her belief was that God created all human beings, therefore both men and women were capable of not only possessing the Inner Light but also the ability to be a prophet. Fell has been described as a "feminist pioneer".

In 1622, Marie de Gournay published The Equality of Men and Women, in which she argued for equality of the sexes.

== 18th century: the Age of Enlightenment ==
The Age of Enlightenment was characterized by secular intellectual reasoning and a flowering of philosophical writing. Many Enlightenment philosophers defended the rights of women, including Jeremy Bentham (1781), Marquis de Condorcet (1790), and Mary Wollstonecraft (1792). Other important writers of the time that expressed feminist views included Abigail Adams, Catharine Macaulay, and Hedvig Charlotta Nordenflycht.

=== Jeremy Bentham ===
The English utilitarian and classical liberal philosopher Jeremy Bentham said that it was the placing of women in a legally inferior position that made him choose the career of a reformist at the age of eleven, though American critic John Neal claimed to have convinced him to take up women's rights issues during their association between 1825 and 1827. Bentham spoke for complete equality between sexes including the rights to vote and to participate in government. He opposed the asymmetrical sexual moral standards between men and women.

In his Introduction to the Principles of Morals and Legislation (1781), Bentham strongly condemned many countries' common practice to deny women's rights due to allegedly inferior minds. Bentham gave many examples of able female regents.

=== Marquis de Condorcet ===
Nicolas de Condorcet was a mathematician, classical liberal politician, leading French Revolutionary, republican, and Voltairean anti-clericalist. He was also a fierce defender of human rights, including the equality of women and the abolition of slavery, unusual for the 1780s. He advocated for women's suffrage in the new government in 1790 with De l'admission des femmes au droit de cité (For the Admission to the Rights of Citizenship For Women) and an article for Journal de la Société de 1789.

=== Olympe de Gouges and a Declaration ===
Following de Condorcet's repeated, yet failed, appeals to the National Assembly in 1789 and 1790, Olympe de Gouges (in association with the Society of the Friends of Truth) authored and published the Declaration of the Rights of Woman and of the Female Citizen in 1791. This was another plea for the French Revolutionary government to recognize the natural and political rights of women. De Gouges wrote the Declaration in the prose of the Declaration of the Rights of Man and of the Citizen, almost mimicking the failure of men to include more than a half of the French population in egalité. Even though the Declaration did not immediately accomplish its goals, it did set a precedent for a manner in which feminists could satirize their governments for their failures in equality, seen in documents such as A Vindication of the Rights of Woman and A Declaration of Sentiments.

=== Wollstonecraft and A Vindication ===
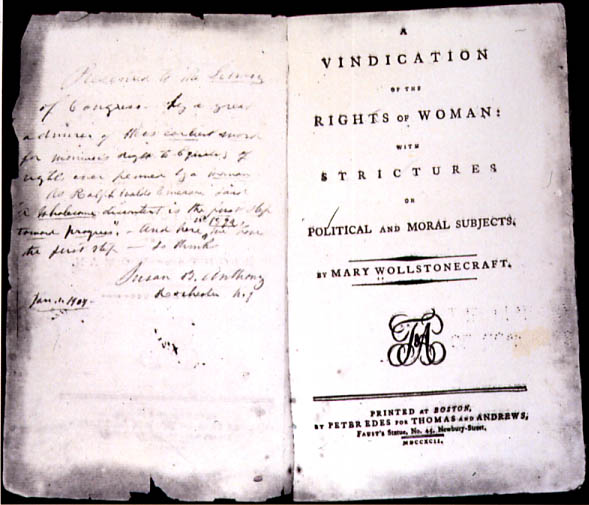
First edition print of A Vindication of the Rights of Woman

Perhaps the most cited feminist writer of the time was Mary Wollstonecraft. She identified the education and upbringing of women as creating their limited expectations based on a self-image dictated by the typically male perspective. Despite her perceived inconsistencies (Miriam Brody referred to the "Two Wollstonecrafts") reflective of problems that had no easy answers, this book remains a foundation stone of feminist thought.

Wollstonecraft believed that both genders contributed to inequality. She took women's considerable power over men for granted, and determined that both would require education to ensure the necessary changes in social attitudes. Given her humble origins and scant education, her personal achievements speak to her own determination. For many commentators, Wollstonecraft represents the first codification of equality feminism, or a refusal of the feminine role in society.

== 19th century ==
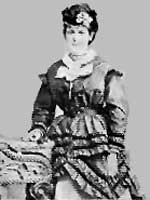
Author and scholar Helen Kendrick Johnson opposed women's suffrage.

=== Utopian socialism ===
The Utopian socialism movement began in the early 19th century as a response to the injustices of capitalism, presenting a vision of social harmony in which people of all classes could opt for a more equitable distribution of resources without class struggle or revolution. Utopian socialists Charles Fourier and Edward Bellamy advocated for economic parity between the genders, while Catherine Isabella Barmby argued for women's enfranchisement. Flora Tristan addressed the intersection between class and gender in her book, The Workers' Union (1843), in which she called women "the last slaves" of French society.

=== The feminine ideal ===
19th-century feminists reacted to cultural inequities including the pernicious, widespread acceptance of the Victorian image of women's "proper" role and "sphere". The Victorian ideal created a dichotomy of "separate spheres" for men and women that was very clearly defined in theory, though not always in reality. In this ideology, men were to occupy the public sphere (the space of wage labor and politics) and women the private sphere (the space of home and children.) This "feminine ideal", also called the Cult of Domesticity or Cult of True Womanhood was typified in Victorian conduct books such as Mrs Beeton's Book of Household Management (1861) and Sarah Stickney Ellis's books. The Angel in the House (1854) and El ángel del hogar (The angel in the house) (1857), bestsellers by Coventry Patmore and María del Pilar Sinués de Marco, came to symbolize the Victorian feminine ideal. Queen Victoria herself disparaged the concept of feminism, which she described in private letters as the "mad, wicked folly of 'Woman's Rights'".

=== Feminism in fiction ===
As Jane Austen addressed women's restricted lives in the early part of the century, Charlotte Brontë, Anne Brontë, Elizabeth Gaskell, and George Eliot depicted women's misery and frustration. In her autobiographical novel Ruth Hall (1854), American journalist Fanny Fern describes her own struggle to support her children as a newspaper columnist after her husband's untimely death. Louisa May Alcott penned a strongly feminist novel, A Long Fatal Love Chase (1866), about a young woman's attempts to flee her bigamist husband and become independent.

Male authors also recognized injustices against women. The novels of George Meredith, George Gissing, and Thomas Hardy, and the plays of Henrik Ibsen outlined the contemporary plight of women. Meredith's Diana of the Crossways (1885) is an account of Caroline Norton's life. One critic later called Ibsen's plays "feministic propaganda".

=== John Neal ===
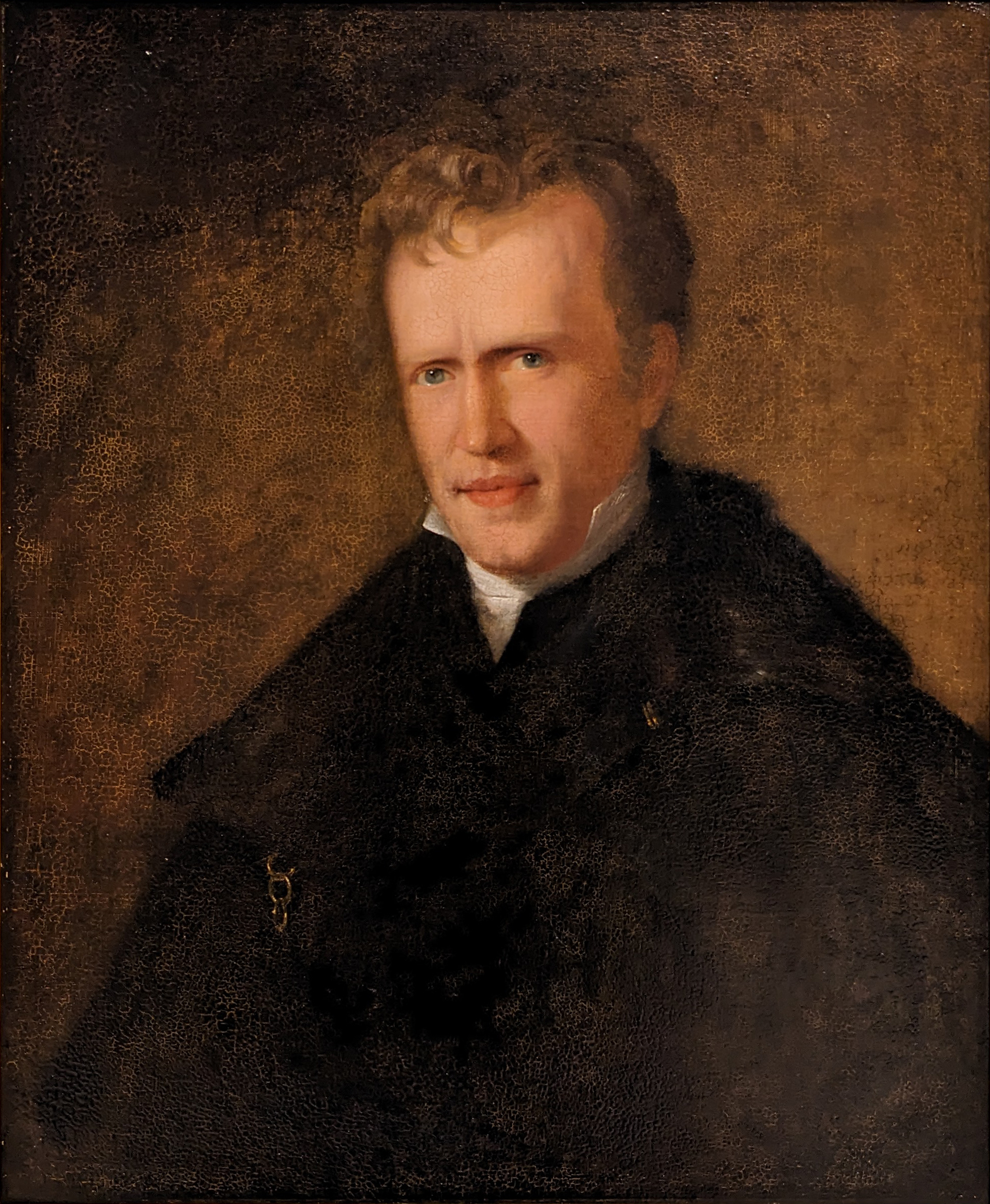
John Neal

John Neal is remembered as America's first women's rights lecturer. Starting in 1823 and continuing at least as late as 1869, he used magazine articles, short stories, novels, public speaking, political organizing, and personal relationships to advance feminist issues in the United States and Great Britain, reaching the height of his influence in this field circa 1843. He declared intellectual equality between men and women, fought coverture, and demanded suffrage, equal pay, and better education and working conditions for women. Neal's early feminist essays in the 1820s fill an intellectual gap between Mary Wollstonecraft, Catharine Macaulay, and Judith Sargent Murray and Seneca Falls Convention-era successors like Sarah Moore Grimké, Elizabeth Cady Stanton, and Margaret Fuller. As a male writer insulated from many common forms of attack against female feminist thinkers, Neal's advocacy was crucial in bringing the field back into the mainstream in England and the US.

In his essays for Blackwood's Magazine (1824–1825), Neal called for women's suffrage and "maintain[ed] that women are not inferior to men, but only unlike men, in their intellectual properties" and "would have women treated like men, of common sense." In The Yankee magazine (1828–1829), he demanded economic opportunities for women, saying "We hope to see the day ... when our women of all ages ... will be able to maintain herself, without being obliged to marry for bread." At his most well-attended lecture titled "Rights of Women", Neal spoke before a crowd of around 3,000 people in 1843 at New York City's largest auditorium at the time, the Broadway Tabernacle. Neal became even more prominently involved with the women's suffrage movement in his old age following the Civil War, both in Maine and nationally in the US by supporting Elizabeth Cady Stanton's and Susan B. Anthony's National Woman Suffrage Association and writing for its journal, The Revolution. Stanton and Anthony recognized his work after his death in their History of Woman Suffrage.

=== Marion Kirkland Reid and Caroline Norton ===
In 1843, Scottish writer Marion Kirkland Reid published her influential A Plea for Woman in 1843, which proposed a transatlantic Western agenda for women's rights, including voting rights for women.

Caroline Norton advocated for changes in British law. She discovered a lack of legal rights for women, in both areas of property and child custody, after leaving her abusive marriage. Her intense campaigning helped the passage of the Custody of Infants Act in 1839. To advocate for married women's property rights, she wrote English Laws for Women in the Nineteenth Century (1854) and followed that up with a direct public appeal to Queen Victoria on the subject. When Parliament took up the issue of divorce reform in 1855, Norton gave a detailed account of her own experience, ultimately helping to secure passage of the Matrimonial Causes Act (1857).

=== Langham Place Group ===
Women's rights advocates including Helen Blackburn, Barbara Leigh Smith, Bessie Rayner Parkes and Anna Jameson met regularly during the 1850s in London's Langham Place to discuss the united women's voice that would be necessary for achieving reform. Called the Langham Place Group, they focused on reforms needed in education, employment, and marital law. Many of their members were also involved with the Married Women's Property Committee, which also included Emmeline Pankhurst, Jacob Bright and Ursula Bright as members. They collected thousands of signatures for legislative reform petitions, some of which were successful, such as the Married Women's Property Act of 1882.

The Langham Place Group founded the English Women's Journal to take on employment and education issues; the chief editors were Parkes and Matilda Mary Hays. The journal also established the Society for Promoting the Employment of Women (SPEW), the "brainchild" of Jessie Boucherett.

Harriet Taylor published her Enfranchisement in 1851, and wrote about the inequities of family law. In 1853, she married John Stuart Mill, and provided him with much of the subject material for The Subjection of Women. In 1854, the same year as Norton's English Laws for Women, Smith summarized the legal framework for injustice in A Brief Summary of the Laws of England Concerning Women.

Emily Davies also encountered the Langham group, and with Elizabeth Garrett created SPEW branches outside London.

=== Access to education and employment ===
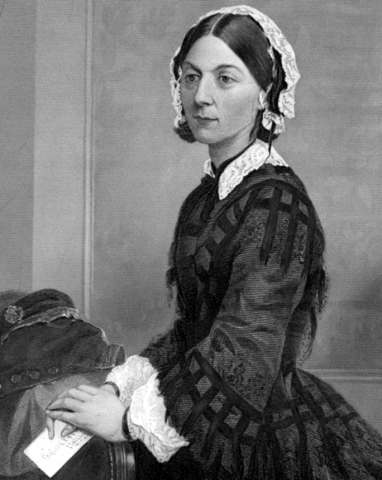
Florence Nightingale

The interrelated barriers to education and employment formed the backbone of 19th-century feminist reform efforts, led by women including Florence Nightingale, Harriet Martineau, and Anna Wheeler. Florence Nightingale's belief that women had all the potential of men but none of the opportunities impelled her storied nursing career. At the time, her feminine virtues were emphasized over her ingenuity, an example of the bias against acknowledging female accomplishment.

Harriet Martineau chronicled the impacts of slavery in America and interrogated the status of women in her Society in America (1837). An ardent abolitionist, she argued that the "stain [of slavery] touched everything in Jacksonian America." She also noted: "The intellect of women is confined by an unjustifiable restriction of... education... As women have none of the objects in life for which an enlarged education is considered requisite, the education is not given..."

Like Martineau, Frances Power Cobbe called for education reform, an issue that gained attention alongside marital and property rights, and domestic violence. Cobbe would refer to "Woman's Rights" not just in the abstract, but as an identifiable cause.

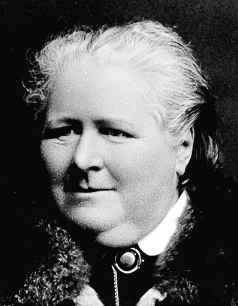
Frances Cobbe

Anna Wheeler was influenced by Saint Simonian socialists while working in France. She advocated for suffrage and attracted the attention of Benjamin Disraeli, the Conservative leader, as a dangerous radical. She would inspire early socialist and feminist advocate William Thompson, who wrote the first work published in English to advocate full equality of rights for women, the 1825 "Appeal of One Half of the Human Race".

A journalist and writer associated with the transcendental movement who became America's first female war correspondent, Margaret Fuller argued for equal property rights in her book Woman in the Nineteenth Century (1845). She also believed that women should be able to pursue any jobs they wished, not just those associated with feminine stereotypes: "If you ask me what office women should fill, I reply—any ... let them be sea captains if you will. I do not doubt that there are women well fitted for such an office."

The education reform efforts of women like Davies and the Langham group slowly made inroads. Queen's College (1848) and Bedford College (1849) in London began to offer some education to women from 1848. By 1862, Davies established a committee to persuade the universities to allow women to sit for the recently established Local Examinations (exams that assessed academic acumen), which achieved some success by 1865. She published The Higher Education of Women a year later. In 1869, Davies and Barbara Bodichon founded the first higher educational institution for women, the College for Women at Benslow House (later called Girton College, Cambridge). Two years later, another college for women, Newnham College, was founded at Cambridge, and Lady Margaret Hall, Oxford in 1879. Despite these measurable advances, few could take advantage of them and life for female students was still difficult: Doctors claimed women who studied too much could develop "anorexia scholastica", rendering them sexless and female students at Oxford and Cambridge were denied degrees equal to their male counterparts until 1948.

In the United States, female seminaries had existed since the founding of the country, but served to educate only unmarried white women going into teaching. In 1837, two years after becoming one of the first colleges to admit African American men, Oberlin College began admitting women, becoming the first co-educational college in the US. That same year, educational reformer Mary Lyon founded Mount Holyoke Female Seminary (later Mount Holyoke College), the oldest school in the US that was conceived as an institution of higher learning for women.

In 1849, Elizabeth Blackwell became the first American woman to earn a medical degree. In 1862, Mary Jane Patterson graduated from Oberlin, becoming the first Black woman in America to receive a bachelor's degree. In 1870, Ada Kepley became the first woman to graduate from law school in the US.

=== Women's campaigns ===
Campaigns gave women opportunities to test their new political skills and to conjoin disparate social reform groups. Their successes include the campaign for the Married Women's Property Act (passed in 1882) and the campaign to repeal the Contagious Diseases Acts of 1864, 1866, and 1869, which united women's groups and utilitarian liberals like John Stuart Mill.

Generally, women were outraged by the inherent inequity and misogyny of the legislation. For the first time, women in large numbers took up the rights of prostitutes. Prominent critics included Blackwell, Nightingale, Martineau, and Elizabeth Wolstenholme. Elizabeth Garrett, unlike her sister, Millicent, did not support the campaign, though she later admitted that the campaign had done well.

Josephine Butler, already experienced in prostitution issues, a charismatic leader, and a seasoned campaigner, emerged as the natural leader of what became the Ladies National Association for the Repeal of the Contagious Diseases Acts in 1869. Her work demonstrated the potential power of an organized lobby group. The association successfully argued that the Acts not only demeaned prostitutes, but all women and men by promoting a blatant sexual double standard. Butler's activities resulted in the radicalization of many moderate women. The Acts were repealed in 1886.

On a smaller scale, Annie Besant campaigned for the rights of matchgirls (female factory workers) and against the appalling conditions under which they worked in London. Her work of publicizing the difficult conditions of the workers through interviews in bi-weekly periodicals like The Link became a method for raising public concern over social issues.

== 20th to 21st centuries ==
Feminists did not recognize separate waves of feminism until the second wave was so named by journalist Martha Weinman Lear in a 1968 New York Times Magazine article "The Second Feminist Wave", according to Alice Echols. Jennifer Baumgardner reports criticism by professor Roxanne Dunbar-Ortiz of the division into waves and the difficulty of categorizing some feminists into specific waves, argues that the main critics of a wave are likely to be members of the prior wave who remain vital, and that waves are coming faster. The "waves debate" has influenced how historians and other scholars have established the chronologies of women's political activism.

=== First wave ===
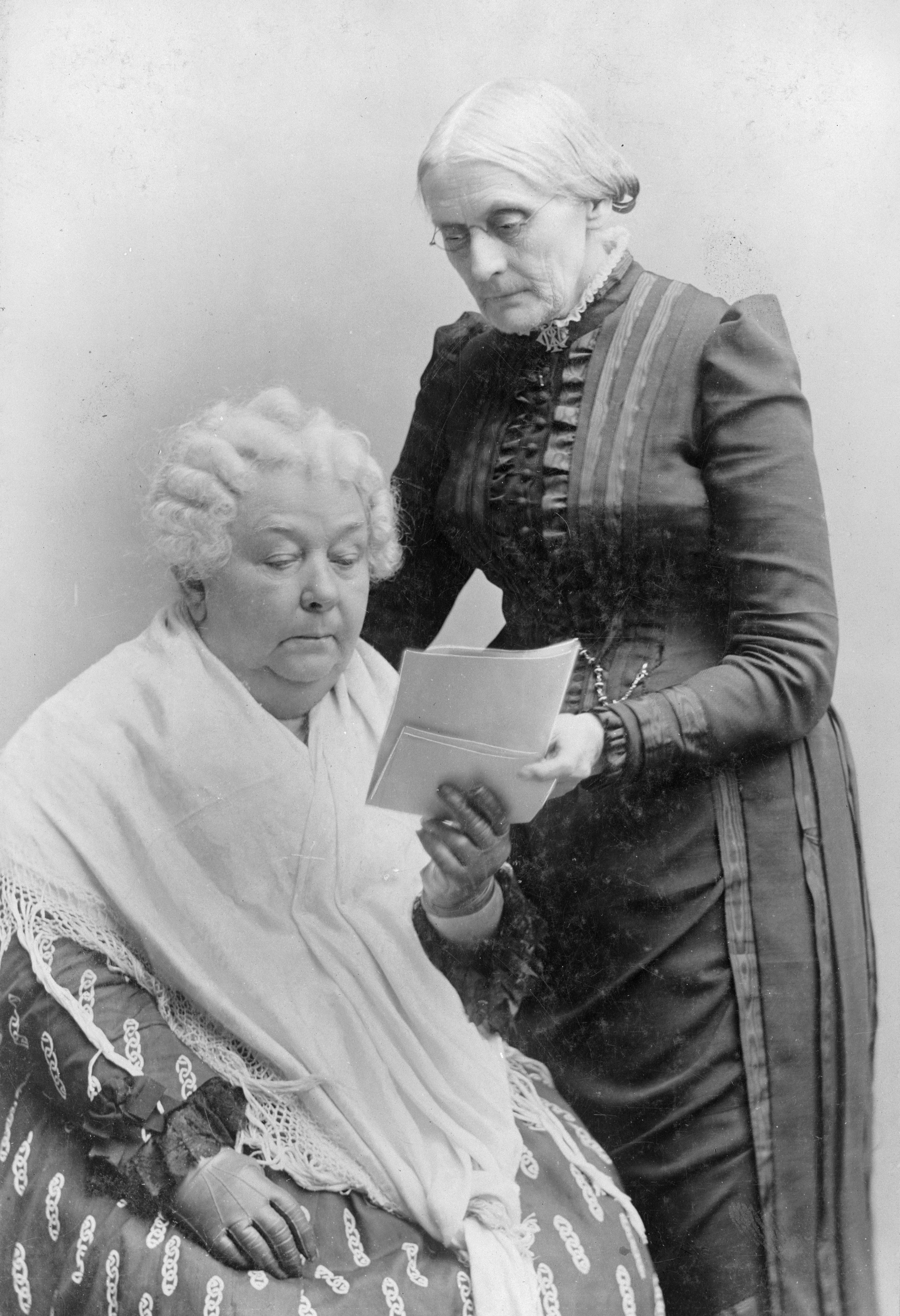
Elizabeth Cady Stanton (seated) and Susan B. Anthony

The 19th- and early 20th-century feminist activity in the English-speaking world that sought to win women's suffrage, female education rights, better working conditions, and abolition of gender double standards is known as first-wave feminism. The term "first-wave" was coined retrospectively when the term second-wave feminism was used to describe a newer feminist movement that fought social and cultural inequalities beyond basic political inequalities. In the United States, feminist movement leaders campaigned for the national abolition of slavery and Temperance before championing women's rights. American first-wave feminism involved a wide range of women, some belonging to conservative Christian groups (such as Frances Willard and the Woman's Christian Temperance Union), others resembling the diversity and radicalism of much of second-wave feminism (such as Stanton, Anthony, Matilda Joslyn Gage, and the National Woman Suffrage Association, of which Stanton was president). First-wave feminism in the United States is considered to have ended with the passage of the Nineteenth Amendment to the United States Constitution (1920), which granted women the right to vote in the United States.

Activism for the equality of women was not limited to the United States. In mid-nineteenth century Persia, Táhirih, an early member of the Bábí Faith, was active as a poet and religious reformer. At a time when it was considered taboo for women to speak openly with men in Persia, and for non-clerics to speak about religion, she challenged the intellectuals of the age in public discourse on social and theological matters. In 1848 she appeared before an assemblage of men without a veil and gave a speech on the rights of women, signaling a radical break with the prevailing moral order and the start of a new religious and social dispensation. After this episode she was put under house arrest by the Persian Government until her execution by strangling at the age of 35 in August 1852. At her execution she is reported as proclaiming "You can kill me as soon as you like, but you cannot stop the emancipation of women." The story of her life rapidly spread to European circles and she would inspire later generations of Iranian feminists. Members of the Bahá'í Faith recognize her as the first women's suffrage martyr and an example of fearlessness and courage in the advancement of the equality of women and men.

Louise Dittmar campaigned for women's rights, in Germany, in the 1840s. Although slightly later in time, Fusae Ichikawa was in the first wave of women's activists in her own country of Japan, campaigning for women's suffrage. Mary Lee was active in the suffrage movement in South Australia, the first Australian colony to grant women the vote in 1894. In New Zealand, Kate Sheppard and Mary Ann Müller worked to achieve the vote for women by 1893.

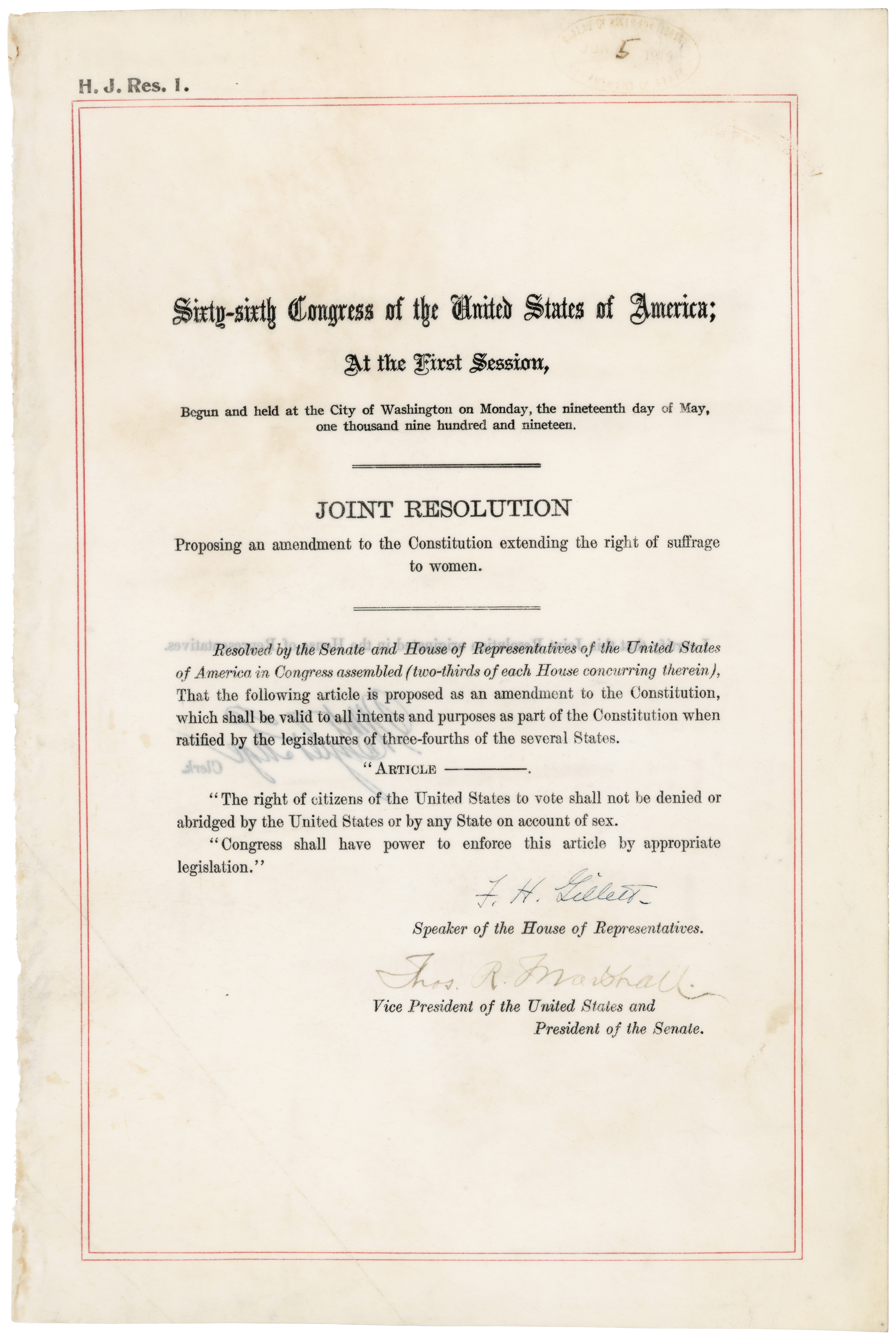
The Nineteenth Amendment

In the United States, the antislavery campaign of the 1830s served as both a cause ideologically compatible with feminism and a blueprint for later feminist political organizing. Attempts to exclude women only strengthened their convictions. Sarah and Angelina Grimké moved rapidly from the emancipation of slaves to the emancipation of women. The most influential feminist writer of the time was the colourful journalist Margaret Fuller, whose Woman in the Nineteenth Century was published in 1845. Her dispatches from Europe for the New York Tribune helped create to synchronize the women's rights movement.

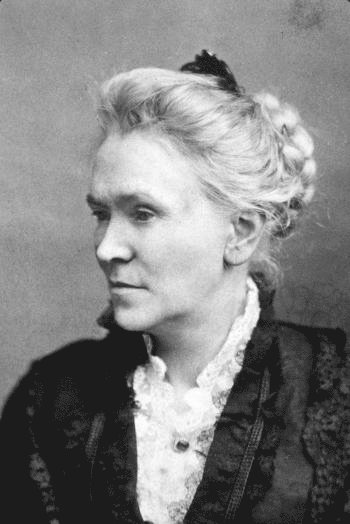
Matilda Joslyn Gage

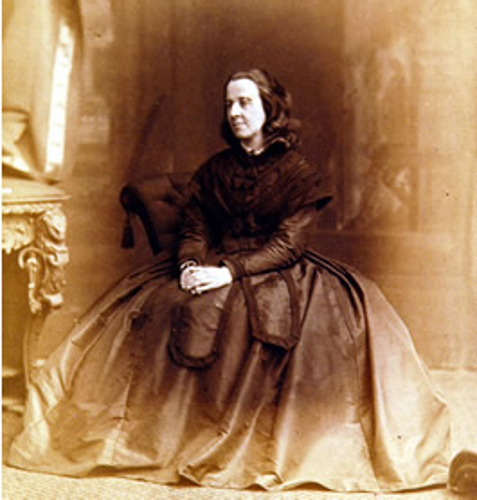
Bessie Rayner Parkes

Elizabeth Cady Stanton and Lucretia Mott met in 1840 while en route to London where they were shunned as women by the male leadership of the first World's Anti-Slavery Convention. In 1848, Mott and Stanton held a woman's rights convention in Seneca Falls, New York, where a declaration of independence for women was drafted. Lucy Stone helped to organize the first National Women's Rights Convention in 1850, a much larger event at which Sojourner Truth, Abby Kelley Foster, and others spoke sparked Susan B. Anthony to take up the cause of women's rights. In December 1851, Sojourner Truth contributed to the feminist movement when she spoke at the Women's Convention in Akron, Ohio. She delivered her powerful "Ain't I a Woman" speech in an effort to promote women's rights by demonstrating their ability to accomplish tasks that have been traditionally associated with men. Barbara Leigh Smith met with Mott in 1858, strengthening the link between the transatlantic feminist movements.

Stanton and Matilda Joslyn Gage saw the Church as a major obstacle to women's rights, and welcomed the emerging literature on matriarchy. Both Gage and Stanton produced works on this topic, and collaborated on The Woman's Bible. Stanton wrote "The Matriarchate or Mother-Age" and Gage wrote Woman, Church and State, neatly inverting Johann Jakob Bachofen's thesis and adding a unique epistemological perspective, the critique of objectivity and the perception of the subjective.

Stanton once observed regarding assumptions of female inferiority, "The worst feature of these assumptions is that women themselves believe them". However this attempt to replace androcentric (male-centered) theological tradition with a gynocentric (female-centered) view made little headway in a women's movement dominated by religious elements; thus she and Gage were largely ignored by subsequent generations.

By 1913, Feminism (originally capitalized) was a household term in the United States. Major issues in the 1910s and 1920s included suffrage, women's partisan activism, economics and employment, sexualities and families, war and peace, and a Constitutional amendment for equality. Both equality and difference were seen as routes to women's empowerment. Organizations at the time included the National Woman's Party, suffrage advocacy groups such as the National American Woman Suffrage Association and the National League of Women Voters, career associations such as the American Association of University Women, the National Federation of Business and Professional Women's Clubs, and the National Women's Trade Union League, war and peace groups such as the Women's International League for Peace and Freedom and the International Council of Women, alcohol-focused groups like the Woman's Christian Temperance Union and the Women's Organization for National Prohibition Reform, and race- and gender-centered organizations like the National Association of Colored Women. Leaders and theoreticians included Jane Addams, Ida B. Wells-Barnett, Alice Paul, Carrie Chapman Catt, Margaret Sanger, and Charlotte Perkins Gilman.

=== Suffrage ===
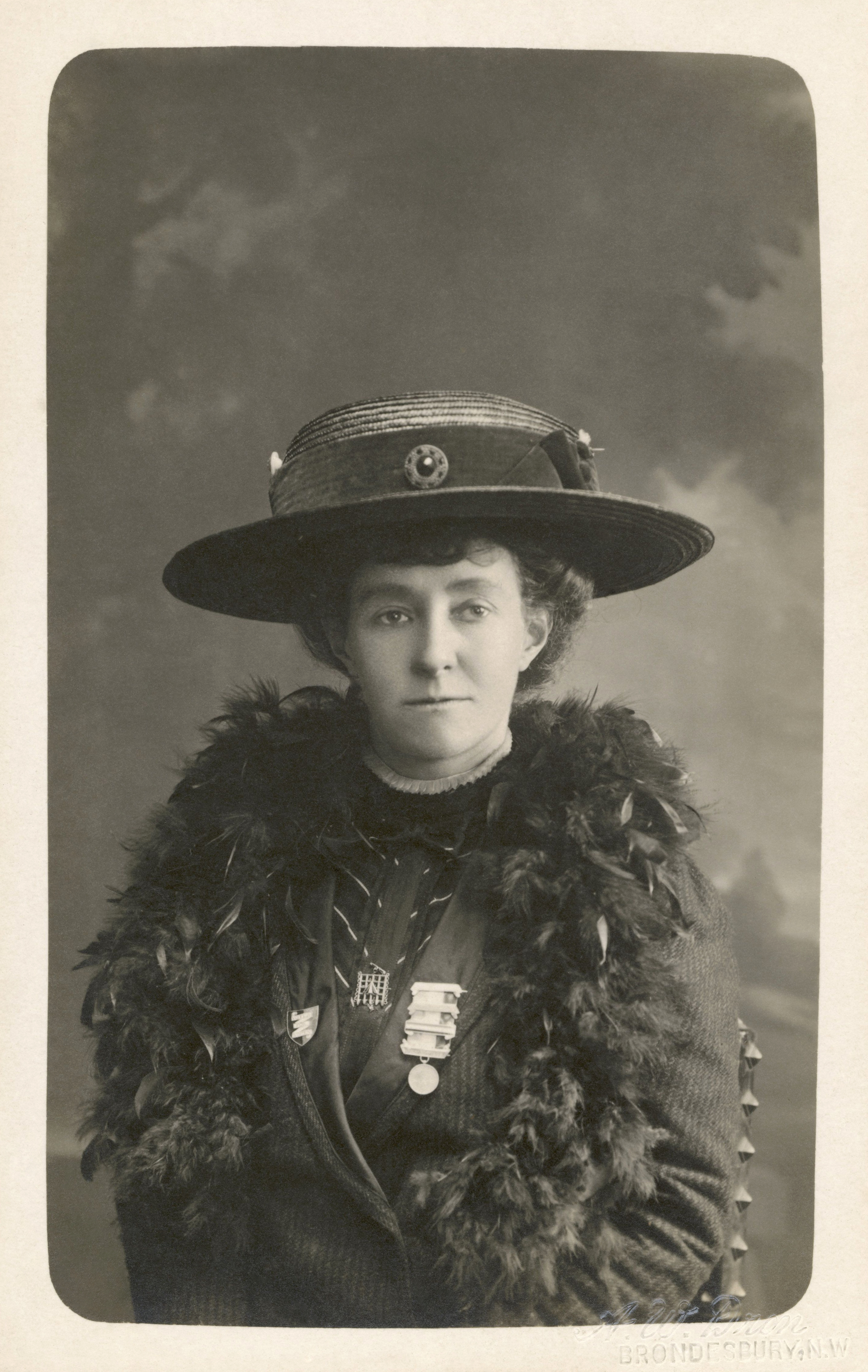
Emily Davison

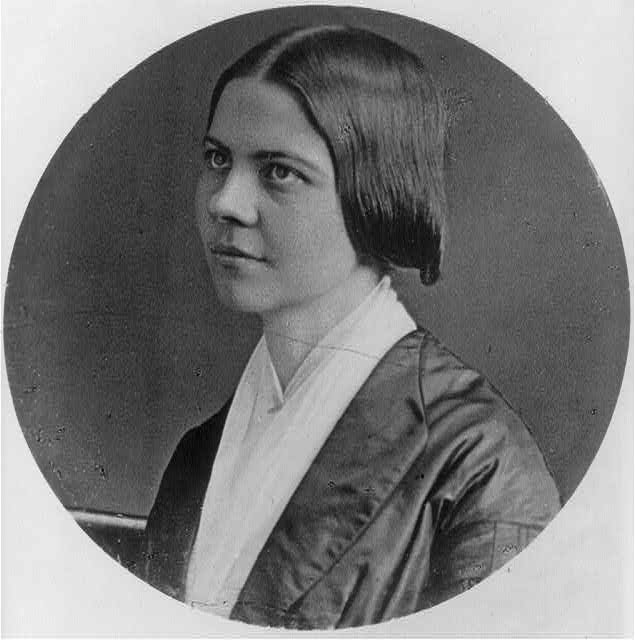
Lucy Stone

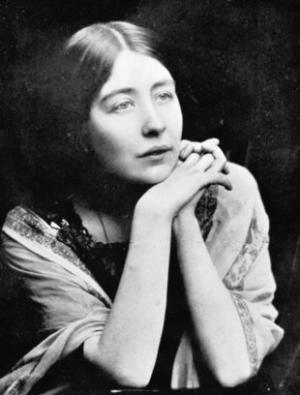
Sylvia Pankhurst

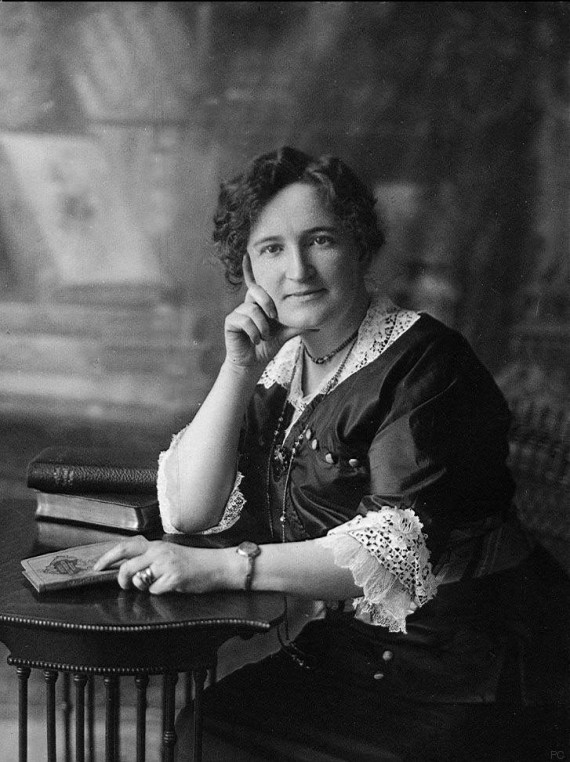
Nellie McClung

At first, women's suffrage was treated as a lower priority by most governments. This, however, started to change with the French Revolution; while it did not give women any political say whatsoever, it did elevate the status of women through their participation in the revolution, like in the Women's March on Versailles. Women's suffrage became a topic that started to be taken seriously, with Condorcet's On The Admission of Women to the Rights of Citizenship and de Gouges' Declaration of the Rights of Woman. In 1793, the Society of Revolutionary Republican Women was founded, and originally included suffrage on its agenda before it was suppressed at the end of the year.

German women were involved in the Vormärz, a prelude to the 1848 revolution. In Italy, Clara Maffei, Cristina Trivulzio Belgiojoso, and Ester Martini Currica were politically active in the events leading up to 1848. In Britain, interest in suffrage emerged from the writings of Wheeler and Thompson in the 1820s, and from Reid, Taylor, and Anne Knight in the 1840s. While New Zealand was the first sovereign state where women won the right to vote (1893), they did not win the right to stand in elections until later. The Australian State of South Australia was the first sovereign state in the world to officially grant full suffrage to women (in 1894).

==== The suffragettes ====
The Langham Place ladies set up a suffrage committee at an 1866 meeting at Elizabeth Garrett's home, renamed the London Society for Women's Suffrage in 1867. Soon similar committees had spread across the country, raising petitions, and working closely with John Stuart Mill. When denied outlets by establishment periodicals, feminists started their own, such as Lydia Becker's Women's Suffrage Journal in 1870.

Other publications included Richard Pankhurst's Englishwoman's Review (1866). Tactical disputes were the biggest problem, and the groups' memberships fluctuated. Women considered whether men (like Mill) should be involved. As it went, Mill withdrew as the movement became more aggressive with each disappointment. The political pressure ensured debate, but year after year the movement was defeated in Parliament.

Despite this, the women accrued political experience, which translated into slow progress at the local government level. But after years of frustration, many women became increasingly radicalized. Some refused to pay taxes, and the Pankhurst family emerged as the dominant movement influence, having also founded the Women's Franchise League in 1889, which sought local election suffrage for women.

==== International suffrage ====
The Isle of Man, a UK dependency, was the first free standing jurisdiction to grant women the vote (1881), followed by the right to vote (but not to stand) in New Zealand in 1893, where Kate Sheppard had pioneered reform. Some Australian states had also granted women the vote. This included Victoria for a brief period (1863–5), South Australia (1894), and Western Australia (1899). Australian women received the vote at the Federal level in 1902, Finland in 1906, and Norway initially in 1907 (completed in 1913).

=== Early 20th century ===
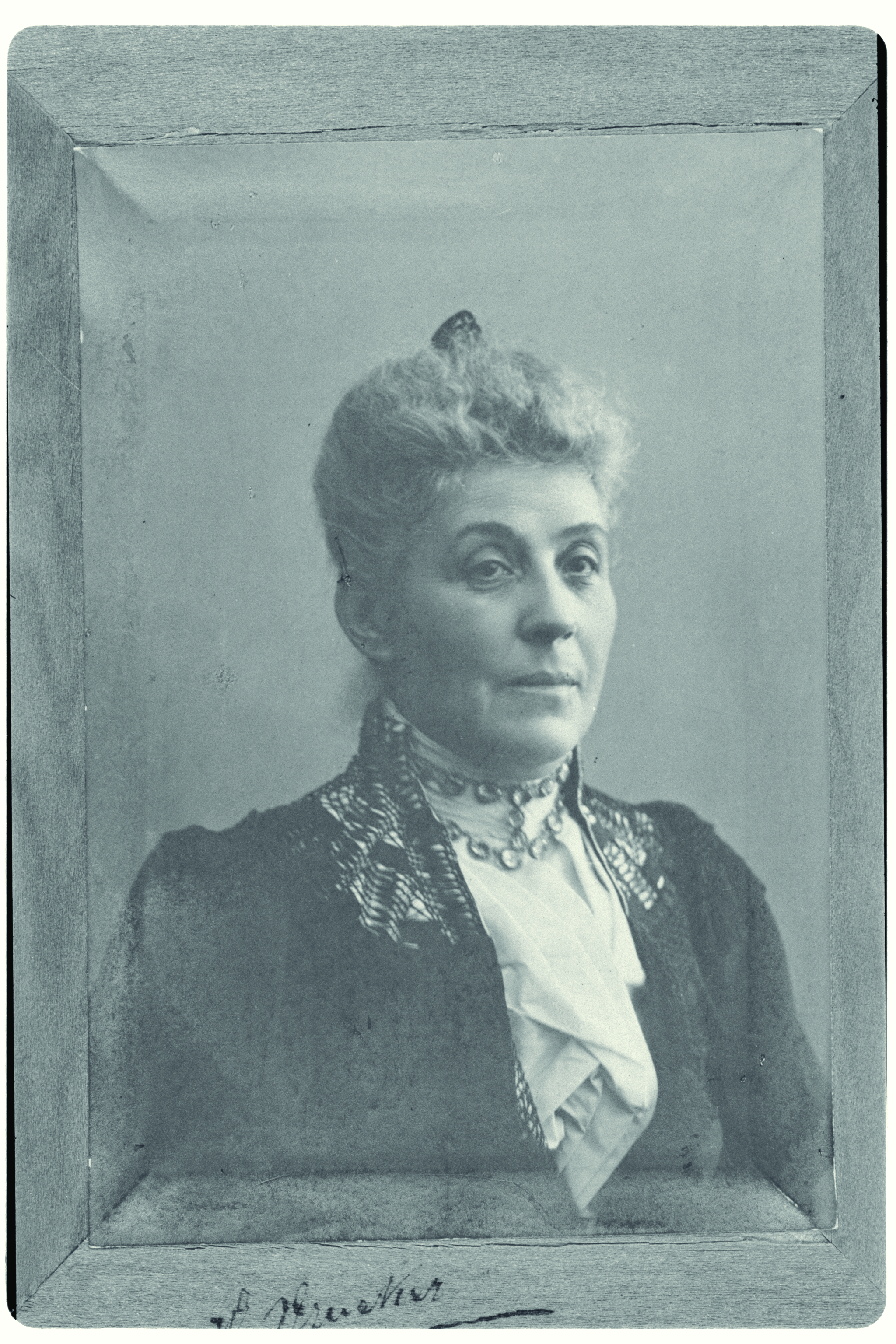
In the Netherlands, Wilhelmina Drucker (1847–1925) fought successfully for the vote and equal rights for women through political and feminist organisations she founded. In 1917–19 her goal of women's suffrage was reached.

In the early part of the 20th century, also known as the Edwardian era, there was a change in the way women dressed from the Victorian rigidity and complacency. Women, especially women who married a wealthy man, would often wear what we consider today, practical.

Books, articles, speeches, pictures, and papers from the period show a diverse range of themes other than political reform and suffrage discussed publicly. In the Netherlands, for instance, the main feminist issues were educational rights, rights to medical care, improved working conditions, peace, and dismantled gender double standards. Feminists identified as such with little fanfare.

Emmeline Pankhurst formed the Women's Social and Political Union (WSPU) in 1903. As she put it, they viewed votes for women no longer as "a right, but as a desperate necessity". At the state level, Australia and the United States had already granted suffrage to some women. American feminists such as Susan B. Anthony (1902) visited Britain. While WSPU was the best-known suffrage group, it was only one of many, such as the Women's Freedom League and the National Union of Women's Suffrage Societies (NUWSS) led by Millicent Garrett Fawcett. WSPU was largely a family affair, although externally financed. Christabel Pankhurst became the dominant figure and gathered friends such as Annie Kenney, Flora Drummond, Teresa Billington, Ethel Smyth, Grace Roe, and Norah Dacre Fox (later known as Norah Elam) around her. Veterans such as Elizabeth Garrett also joined.

In 1906, the Daily Mail first labeled these women "suffragettes" as a form of ridicule, but the term was embraced by the women to describe the more militant form of suffragism visible in public marches, distinctive green, purple, and white emblems, and the Artists' Suffrage League's dramatic graphics. The feminists learned to exploit photography and the media, and left a vivid visual record including images such as the 1914 photograph of Emmeline.

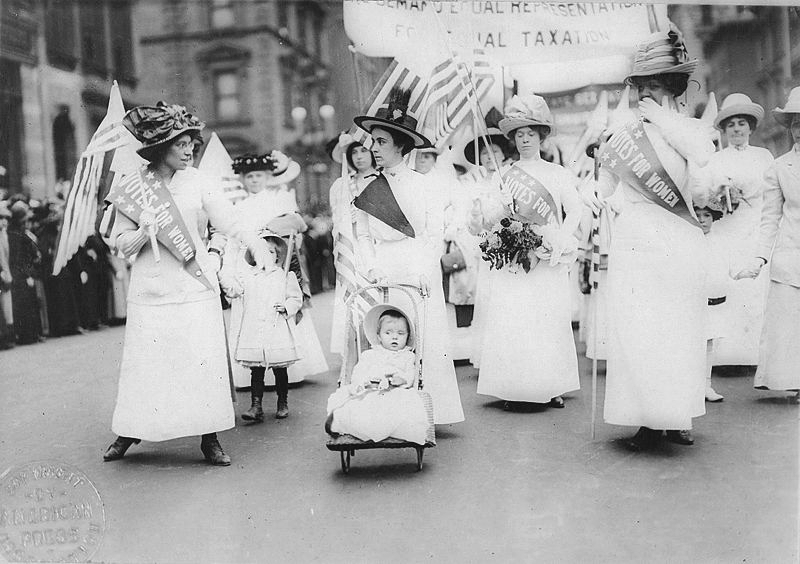
Suffrage parade in New York, May 6, 1912

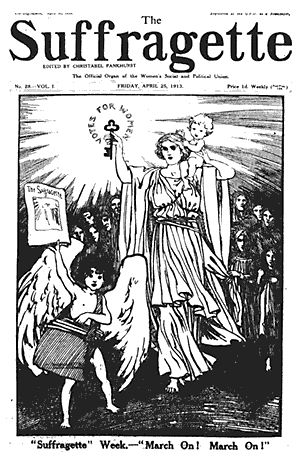
Cover of WSPU's The Suffragette, April 25, 1913 (after Delacroix's Liberty Leading the People, 1830)

The protests slowly became more violent, and included heckling, banging on doors, smashing shop windows, and arson. Emily Davison, a WSPU member, unexpectedly ran onto the track during the 1913 Epsom Derby and died under the King's horse. These tactics produced mixed results of sympathy and alienation. As many protesters were imprisoned and went on hunger-strike, the British government was left with an embarrassing situation. From these political actions, the suffragists successfully created publicity around their institutional discrimination and sexism.

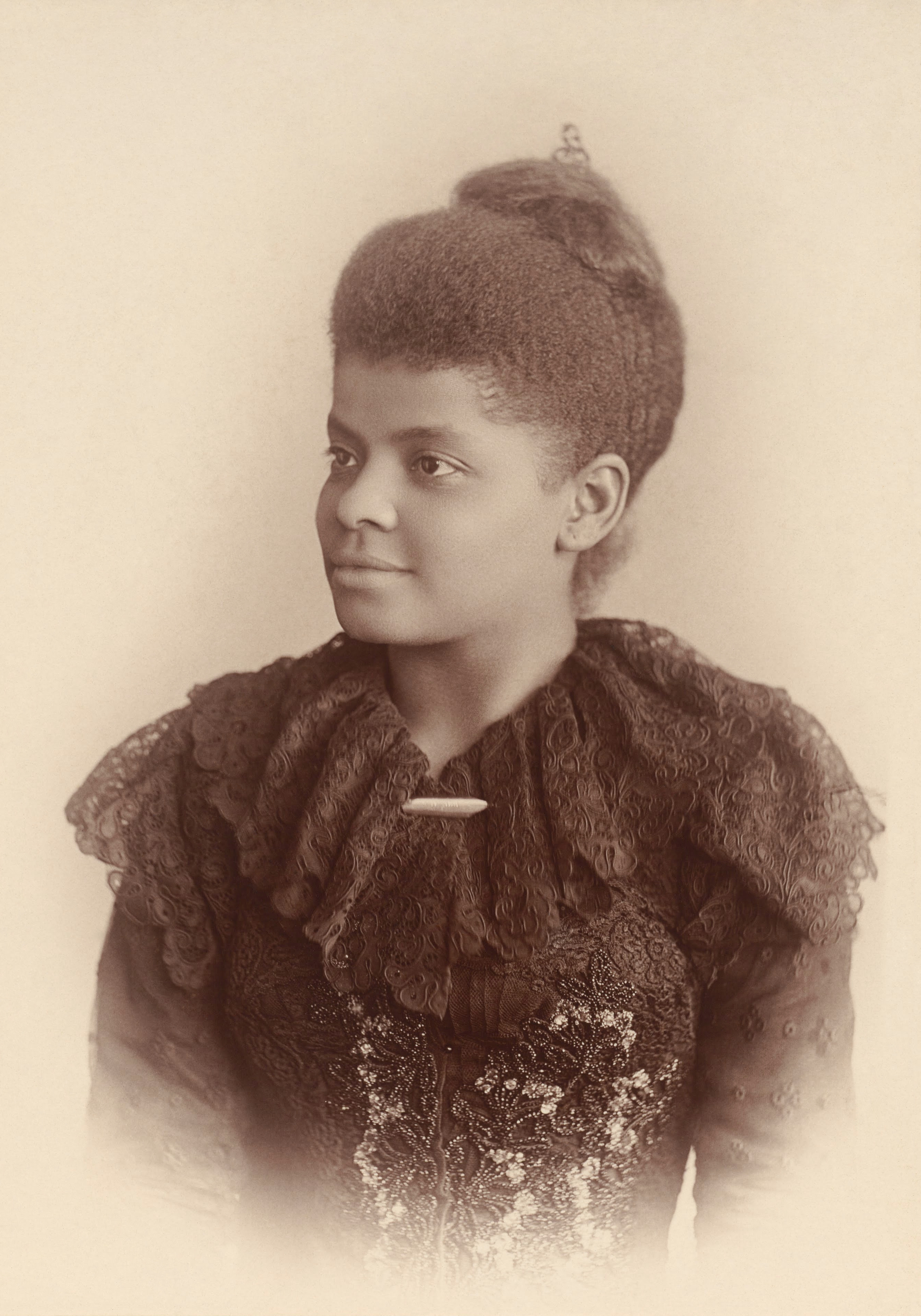
Ida B. Wells

==== Feminist science fiction ====
At the beginning of the 20th century, feminist science fiction emerged as a subgenre of science fiction that deals with women's roles in society. Female writers of the utopian literature movement at the time of first-wave feminism often addressed sexism. Charlotte Perkins Gilman's Herland (1915) did so. Sultana's Dream (1905) by Bengali Muslim feminist Roquia Sakhawat Hussain depicts a gender-reversed purdah in a futuristic world.

During the 1920s, writers such as Clare Winger Harris and Gertrude Barrows Bennett published science fiction stories written from female perspectives and occasionally dealt with gender- and sexuality-based topics while popular 1920s and 30s pulp science fiction exaggerated masculinity alongside sexist portrayals of women. By the 1960s, science fiction combined sensationalism with political and technological critiques of society. With the advent of feminism, women's roles were questioned in this "subversive, mind expanding genre".

Feminist science fiction poses questions about social issues such as how society constructs gender roles, how reproduction defines gender, and how the political power of men and women are unequal. Some of the most notable feminist science fiction works have illustrated these themes using utopias to explore societies where gender differences or gender power imbalances do not exist, and dystopias to explore worlds where gender inequalities are escalated, asserting a need for feminist work to continue.

==== During the first and second world wars ====
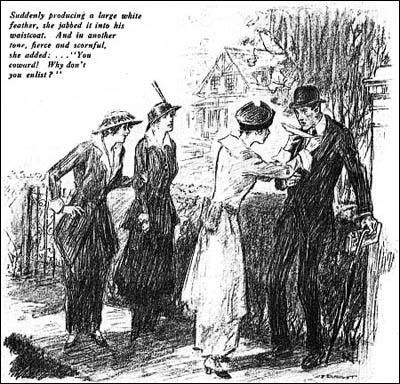
The White Feather: A Sketch of English Recruiting" (Arnold Bennett, 1914)

Women entered the labor market during the First World War in unprecedented numbers, often in new sectors, and discovered the value of their work. The war also left large numbers of women bereaved and with a net loss of household income. The scores of men killed and wounded shifted the demographic composition. War also split the feminist groups, with many women opposed to the war and others involved in the white feather campaign.

Feminist scholars like Françoise Thébaud and Nancy F. Cott note a conservative reaction to World War I in some countries, citing a reinforcement of traditional imagery and literature that promotes motherhood. The appearance of these traits in wartime has been called the "nationalization of women".

In the years between the wars, feminists fought discrimination and establishment opposition to advances in women's roles in the social world and workforce. In Virginia Woolf's A Room of One's Own, Woolf describes the extent of the backlash and her frustration. By now, the word "feminism" was in use, but with a negative connotation from mass media, which discouraged women from self-identifying as such. When Rebecca West, another prominent writer, had been attacked as "a feminist", Woolf defended her. West has been remembered for her comment "I myself have never been able to find out precisely what feminism is: I only know that people call me a feminist whenever I express sentiments that differentiate me from a doormat, or a prostitute."

In the 1920s, the nontraditional styles and attitudes of flappers were popular among American and British women.

==== Electoral reform ====
The United Kingdom's Representation of the People Act 1918 gave near-universal suffrage to men, and suffrage to women over 30. The Representation of the People Act 1928 extended equal suffrage to both men and women. It also shifted the socioeconomic makeup of the electorate towards the working class, favouring the Labour Party, who were more sympathetic to women's issues.

The granting of the vote did not automatically give women the right to stand for Parliament and the Parliament (Qualification of Women) Act was rushed through just before the following election. Seventeen women were among the 1700 candidates nominated. Christabel Pankhurst narrowly failed to win a seat, and Constance Markievicz (Sinn Féin) was the first woman elected in Ireland in 1918, but as an Irish nationalist, refused to take her seat.

In 1919 and 1920, both Lady Astor and Margaret Wintringham won seats for the Conservatives and Liberals respectively by succeeding their husband's seats. Labour swept to power in 1924. Astor's proposal to form a women's party in 1929 was unsuccessful. Women gained considerable electoral experience over the next few years as a series of minority governments ensured almost annual elections. Close affiliation with Labour also proved to be a problem for the National Union of Societies for Equal Citizenship (NUSEC), which had little support in the Conservative party. However, their persistence with Prime Minister Stanley Baldwin was rewarded with the passage of the Representation of the People (Equal Franchise) Act 1928.

European women received the vote in Finland (that time still an autonomous state under Czar Russia) in 1906, in Denmark and Iceland in 1915 (full in 1919), the Russian Republic in 1917, Austria, Germany and Canada in 1918, many countries including the Netherlands in 1919, Czechoslovakia (today Czech Republic and Slovakia) in 1920, and Turkey and South Africa in 1930. French women did not receive the vote until 1945. Liechtenstein was one of the last countries, in 1984.

After French women were given the right to vote in 1945, two women's organizations were founded in the French colony of Martinique. Le Rassemblement féminin and l'Union des femmes de la Martinique both had the goal of encouraging women to vote in the upcoming elections. While l'Union des femmes de la Martinique, founded by Jeanne Lero was influenced by beliefs, Le Rassemblement féminin, founded by Paulette Nardal, claimed to not support any particular political party and only encouraged women to take political action in order to create social change.

==== Social reform ====
The political change did not immediately change social circumstances. With the economic recession, women were the most vulnerable sector of the workforce. Some women who held jobs prior to the war were obliged to forfeit them to returning soldiers, and others were excessed. With limited franchise, the UK National Union of Women's Suffrage Societies (NUWSS) pivoted into a new organization, the National Union of Societies for Equal Citizenship (NUSEC), which still advocated for equality in franchise, but extended its scope to examine equality in social and economic areas. Legislative reform was sought for discriminatory laws (e.g., family law and prostitution) and over the differences between equality and equity, the accommodations that would allow women to overcome barriers to fulfillment (known in later years as the "equality vs. difference conundrum"). Eleanor Rathbone, who became a British Member of Parliament in 1929, succeeded Millicent Garrett as president of NUSEC in 1919. She expressed the critical need for consideration of difference in gender relationships as "what women need to fulfill the potentialities of their own natures". The 1924 Labour government's social reforms created a formal split, as a splinter group of strict egalitarians formed the Open Door Council in May 1926. This eventually became an international movement, and continued until 1965. Other important social legislation of this period included the Sex Disqualification (Removal) Act 1919 (which opened professions to women), and the Matrimonial Causes Act 1923. In 1932, NUSEC separated advocacy from education, and continued the former activities as the National Council for Equal Citizenship and the latter as the Townswomen's Guild. The council continued until the end of the Second World War.

==== Reproductive rights ====
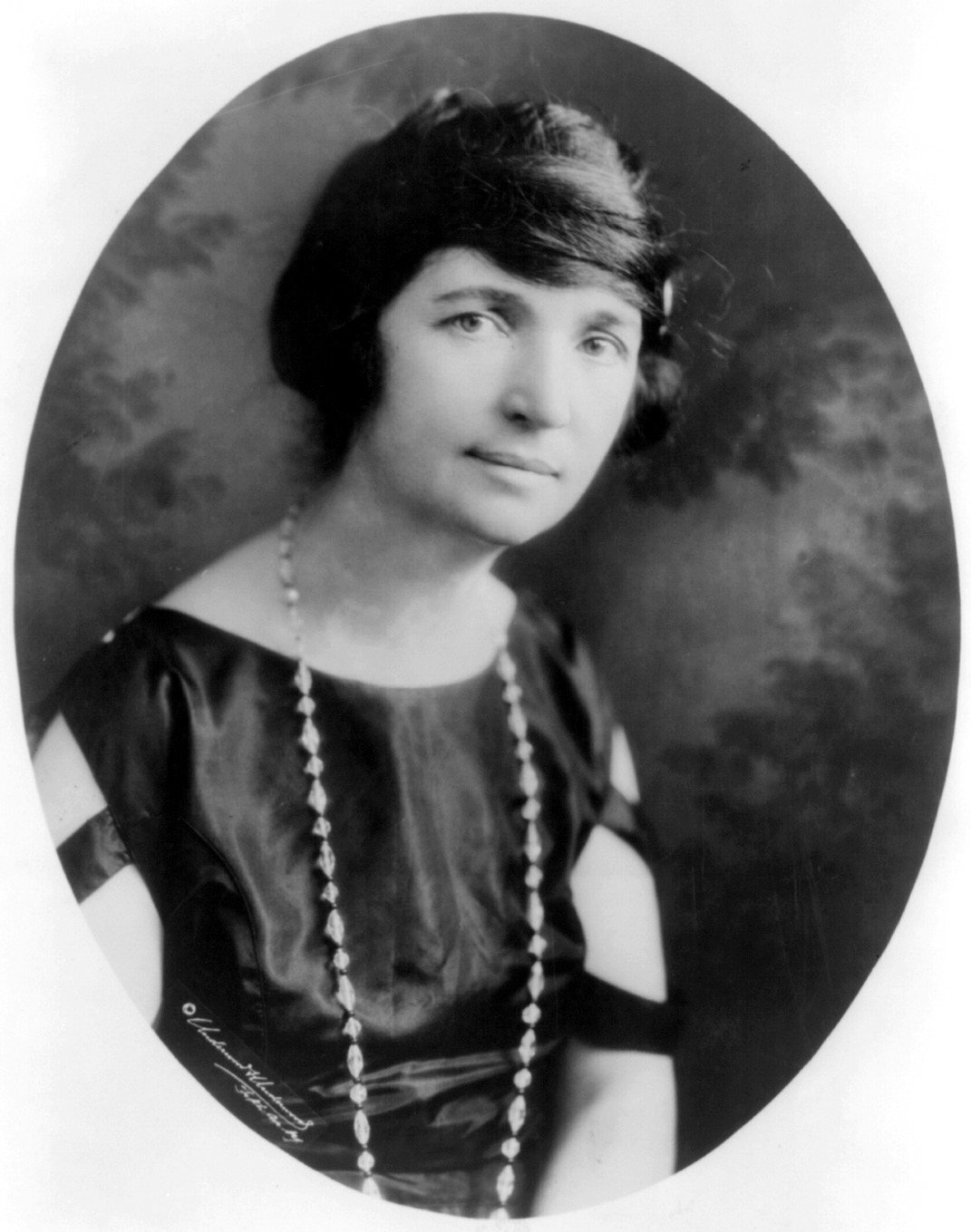
Margaret Sanger

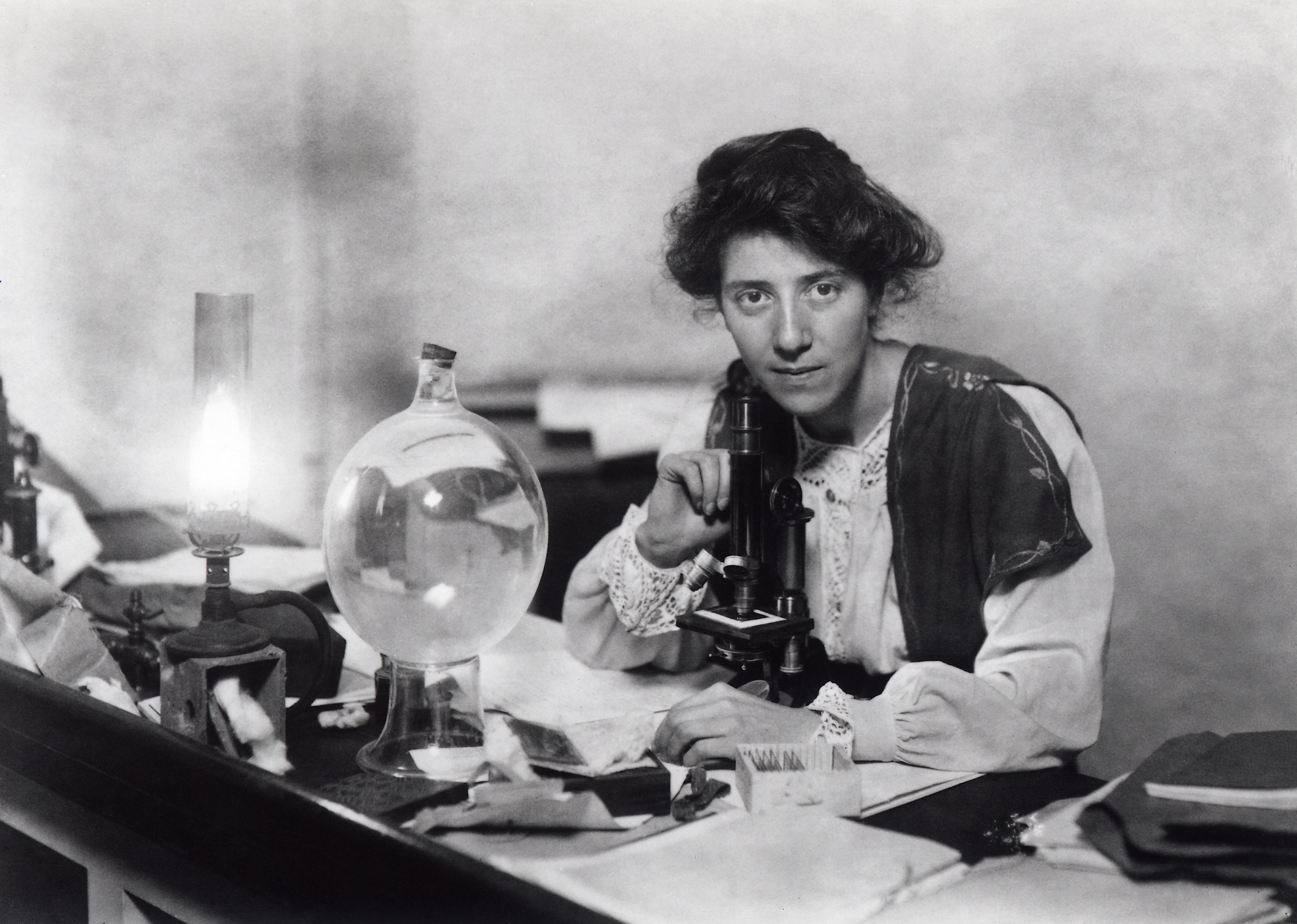
Marie Stopes

British laws prevented feminists from discussing and addressing reproductive rights. Annie Besant was tried under the Obscene Publications Act 1857 in 1877 for publishing Charles Knowlton's Fruits of Philosophy, a work on family planning. Knowlton had previously been convicted in the United States. She and her colleague Charles Bradlaugh were convicted but acquitted on appeal. The subsequent publicity resulted in a decline in the UK's birth rate. Besant later wrote The Law of Population.

In America, Margaret Sanger was prosecuted for her book Family Limitation under the Comstock Act in 1914, and fled to Britain until it was safe to return. Sanger's work was prosecuted in Britain. She met Marie Stopes in Britain, who was never prosecuted but regularly denounced for her promotion of birth control. In 1917, Sanger started the Birth Control Review. In 1926, Sanger gave a lecture on birth control to the women's auxiliary of the Ku Klux Klan in Silver Lake, New Jersey, which she referred to as a "weird experience". The establishment of the Abortion Law Reform Association in 1936 was even more controversial. The British penalty for abortion had been reduced from execution to life imprisonment by the Offences against the Person Act 1861, although some exceptions were allowed in the Infant Life (Preservation) Act 1929. Following Aleck Bourne's prosecution in 1938, the 1939 Birkett Committee made recommendations for reform that were set aside at the Second World War's outbreak, along with many other women's issues.

In the Netherlands, Aletta H. Jacobs, the first Dutch female doctor, and Wilhelmina Drucker led discussion and action for reproductive rights. Jacobs imported diaphragms from Germany and distributed them to poor women for free.

=== 1940s ===
In most front line countries, women volunteered or were conscripted for various duties in support of the national war effort. In Britain, women were drafted and assigned to industrial jobs or to non-combat military service. The British services enrolled 460,000 women. The largest service, Auxiliary Territorial Service, had a maximum of 213,000 women enrolled, many of whom served in anti-aircraft gun combat roles. In many countries, including Germany and the Soviet Union, women volunteered or were conscripted. In Germany, women volunteered in the League of German Girls and assisted the Luftwaffe as anti-aircraft gunners, or as guerrilla fighters in Werwolf units behind Allied lines. In the Soviet Union, about 820,000 women served in the military as medics, radio operators, truck drivers, snipers, combat pilots, and junior commanding officers.

Many American women retained their domestic chores and often added a paid job, especially one related to a war industry. Much more so than in the previous war, large numbers of women were hired for unskilled or semi-skilled jobs in munitions, and barriers against married women taking jobs were eased. The popular Rosie the Riveter icon became a symbol for a generation of American working women. In addition, some 300,000 women served in US military uniform with organizations such as Women's Army Corps and WAVES. With many young men gone, sports organizers tried to set up professional women's teams, such as the All-American Girls Professional Baseball League, which closed after the war. After the war, most munitions plants closed, and civilian plants replaced their temporary female workers with returning veterans, who had priority.

=== Second wave ===
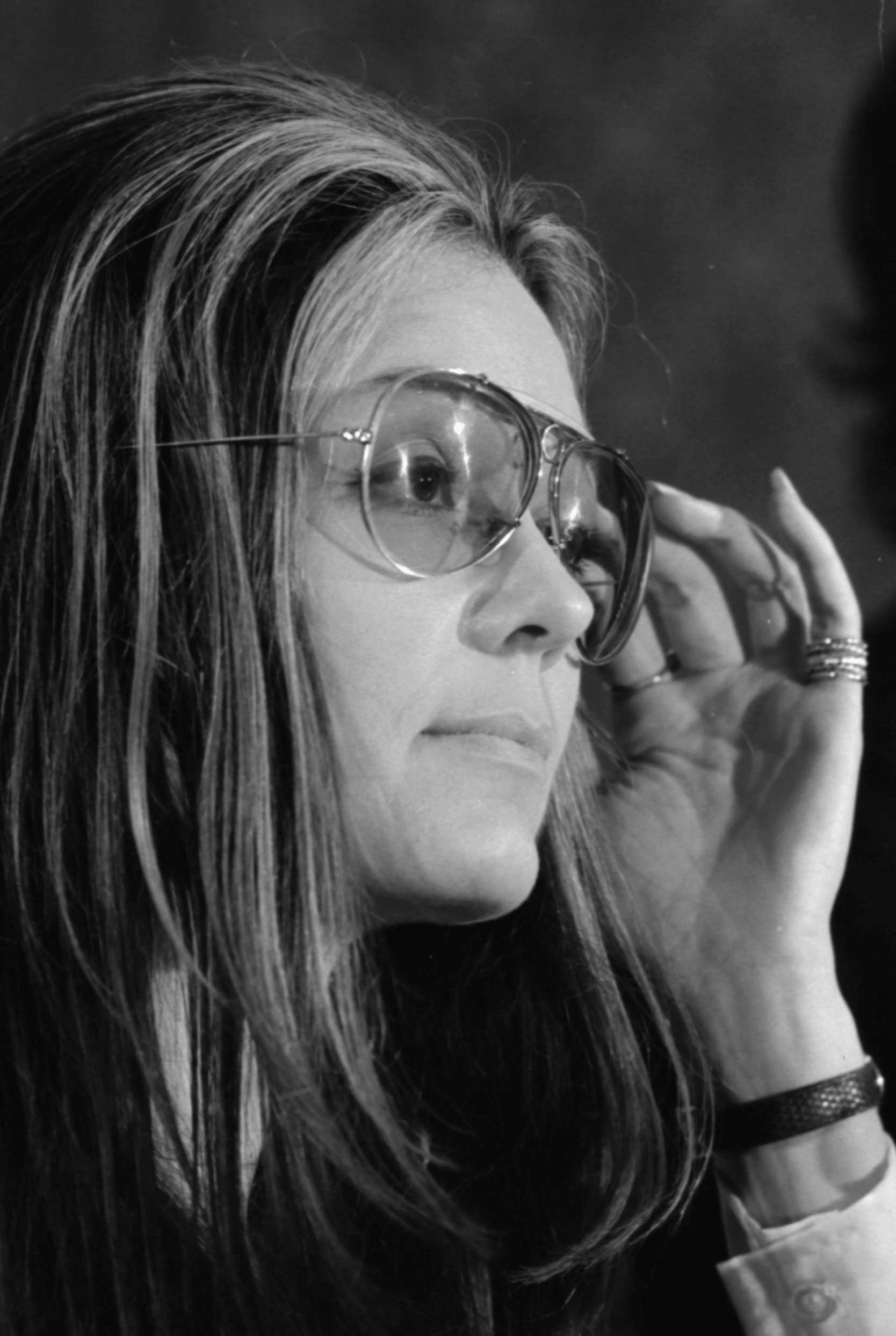
Gloria Steinem at news conference, Women's Action Alliance, January 12, 1972

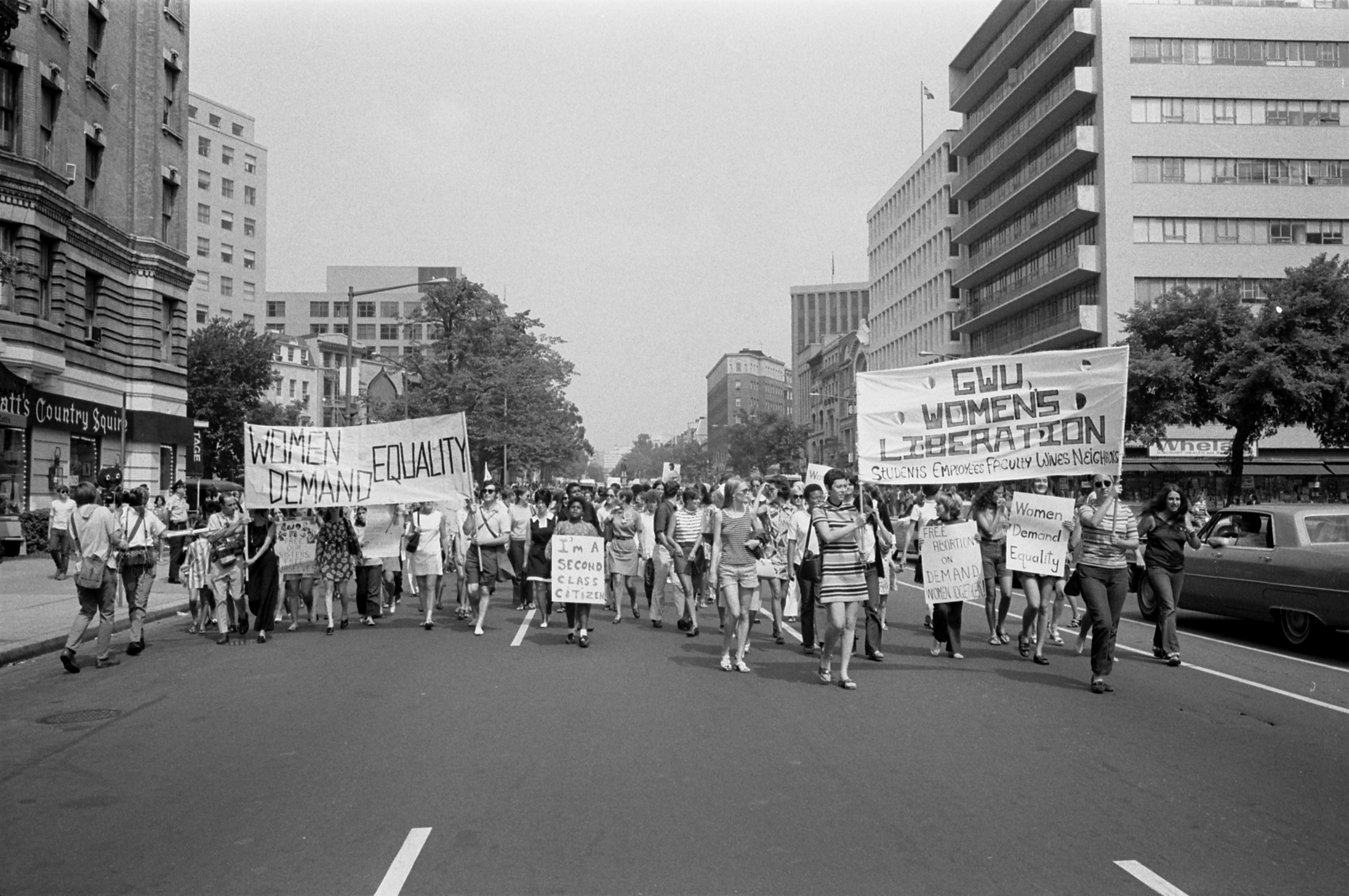
Women's Liberation march in Washington, D.C., 1970

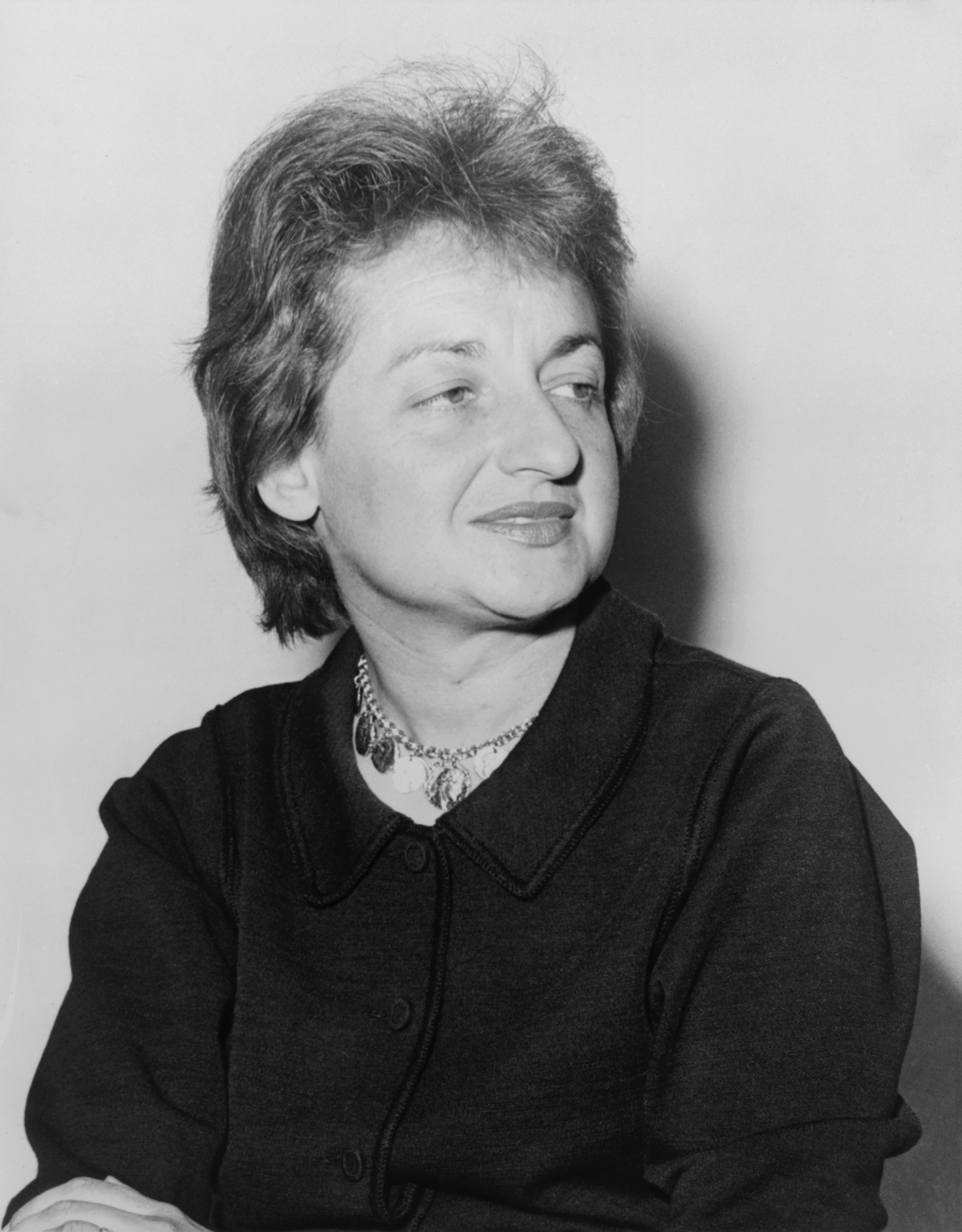
Betty Friedan 1960

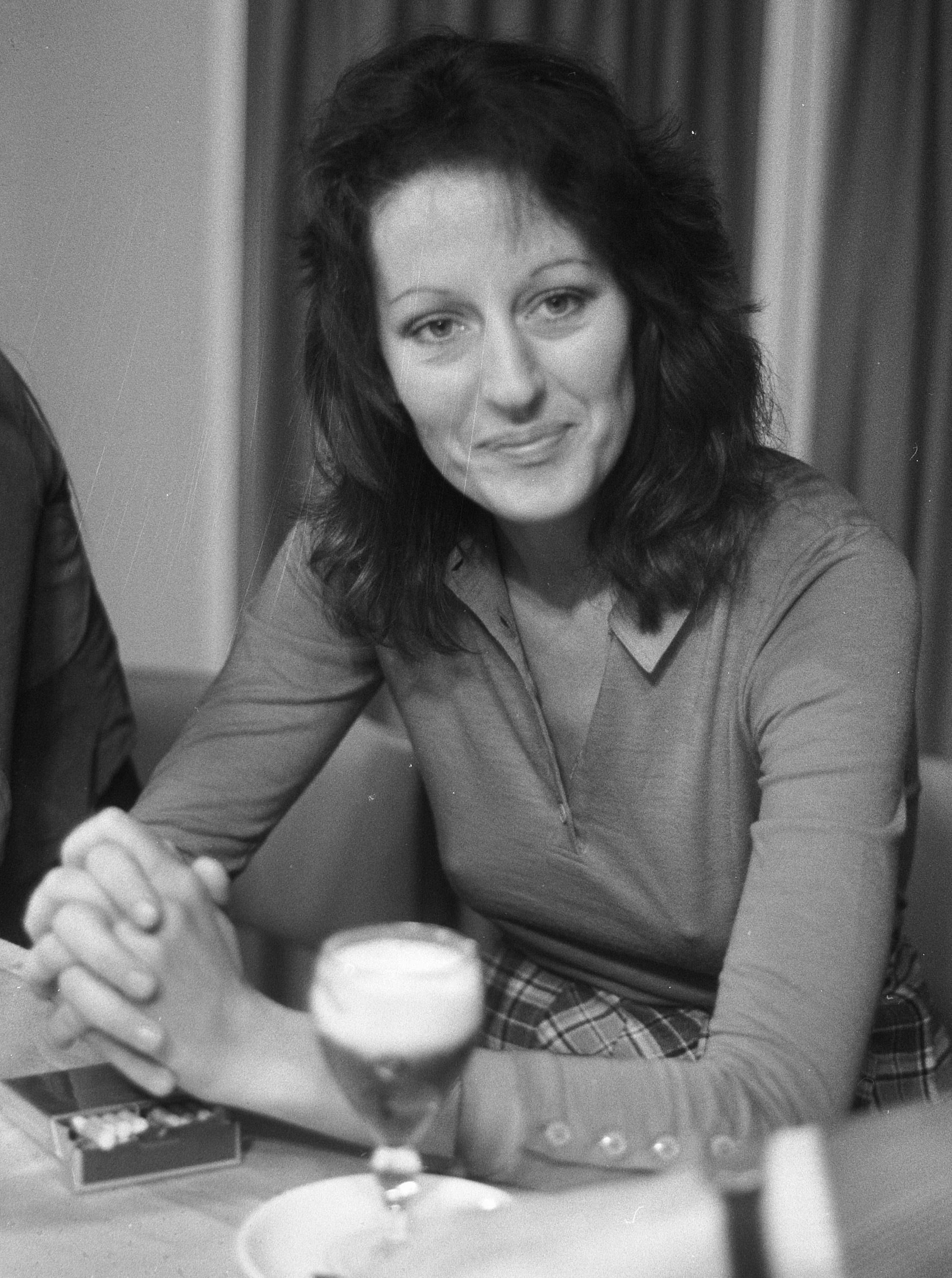
Germaine Greer in June 1972

"Second-wave feminism" identifies a period of feminist activity from the early 1960s through the late 1980s that saw cultural and political inequalities as inextricably linked. The movement encouraged women to understand aspects of their personal lives as deeply politicized and reflective of a sexist power structure. As first-wave feminists focused on absolute rights such as suffrage, second-wave feminists focused on other cultural equality issues, such as ending discrimination.

==== Betty Friedan, The Feminine Mystique, and Women's Liberation ====
A landmark feminist work appeared in 1949 called The Second Sex, a book written by Simone de Beauvoir. The critical text pertained to every facet of what would later be defined as gender discourse. Beauvoir goes into detail on the treatment of women throughout entire history of the world and analyses the modes of oppression enforced by patriarchy and then critiques it. In 1963, Betty Friedan's exposé The Feminine Mystique became the voice for the discontent and disorientation women felt in being shunted into homemaking positions after their college graduations. In the book, Friedan explored the roots of the change in women's roles from essential workforce during World War II to homebound housewife and mother after the war, and assessed the forces that drove this change in perception of women's roles.

The expression "Women's Liberation" has been used to refer to feminism throughout history. "Liberation" has been associated with feminist aspirations since 1895, and appears in the context of "women's liberation" in Simone de Beauvoir's 1949 The Second Sex, which appeared in English translation in 1953. The phrase "women's liberation" was first used in 1964, in print in 1966, though the French equivalent, libération des femmes, occurred as far back as 1911. "Women's liberation" was in use at the 1967 American Students for a Democratic Society (SDS) convention, which held a panel discussion on the topic. In 1968, the term "Women's Liberation Front" appeared in Ramparts magazine, and began to refer to the whole women's movement. In Chicago, women disillusioned with the New Left met separately in 1967, and published Voice of the Women's Liberation Movement in March 1968. When the Miss America pageant took place in Atlantic City in September 1968, the media referred to the resulting demonstrations as "Women's Liberation". The Chicago Women's Liberation Union was formed in 1969. Similar groups with similar titles appeared in many parts of the United States. Bra-burning, although fictional, became associated with the movement, and the media coined other terms such as "libber". "Women's Liberation" persisted over the other rival terms for the new feminism, captured the popular imagination, and has endured alongside the older term "Women's Movement".

This time was marked by increased female enrolment in higher education, the establishment of academic women's studies courses and departments, and feminist ideology in other related fields, such as politics, sociology, history, and literature. This academic shift in interests questioned the status quo, and its standards and authority.

The rise of the Women's Liberation movement revealed "multiple feminisms", or different underlying feminist lenses, due to the diverse origins from which groups had coalesced and intersected, and the complexity and contentiousness of the issues involved. bell hooks is noted as a prominent critic of the movement for its lack of voice given to the most oppressed women, its lack of emphasis on the inequalities of race and class, and its distance from the issues that divide women. Helen Reddy's "I Am Woman", John Lennon's "Woman Is the Nigger of the World" and Yoko Ono's "Josei Joui Banzai" were 70s feminist songs. Feminist's wrong protest against rock music movement was started in Los Angeles, where Women Against Violence Against Women was founded in 1976; they campaigned against the Rolling Stones' 1976 album Black and Blue.

=== Feminist writing ===
The publication of Betty Friedan's The Feminine Mystique has been credited with beginning the so-called "second wave" of feminist activism, during which time feminist writers furthered conversations about women's political and sexual concerns. Examples include Gloria Steinem's Ms. magazine and Kate Millett's Sexual Politics. Millett's survey of male writers, their attitudes and biases, demonstrates that sex is politics, and politics is power imbalance in relationships. Shulamith Firestone's The Dialectic of Sex described a feminist revolution based in Marxism, referenced as the "sex war". Considering the debates over patriarchy, she claimed that male domination dated to "back beyond recorded history to the animal kingdom itself."

Beginning in 1968, second-wave feminists began founding feminist and lesbian periodicals so they could publish, read, and discuss women's writings. The women in print movement (WIP) established autonomous communications networks of women writers, publishers, printers, and booksellers. Some feminist presses in the 1970s and 1980s, such as Daughters, Inc., chose not to work with men or sell to non-feminist bookstores because they wanted to focus on establishing a women's culture separate from men. The Women in Print Conference, founded by lesbian feminist June Arnold, brought together feminists and lesbians in the WIP movement. Although most WIP scholarship focuses on the United States and United Kingdom, there were also feminist publications and women's presses in Australia, France, Canada, South Africa, Germany, the Netherlands, Ireland, New Zealand, and India.

Germaine Greer's The Female Eunuch, Sheila Rowbotham's Women's Liberation and the New Politics, and Juliet Mitchell's Woman's Estate are more representative of the English perspective. Mitchell argued that the movement should be seen as an international phenomenon with different manifestations based on local culture. British women drew on left-wing politics and organized small local discussion groups, partly through the London Women's Liberation Workshop and its publications, Shrew and the LWLW Newsletter. Although there were marches, the focus was on consciousness-raising, or political activism intended to bring a cause or condition to a wider audience. Mitchell described women coming into the movement to "find what they thought was an individual dilemma is a social predicament".

US women's writing included works such as Susan Brownmiller's 1975 Against Our Will, which introduced an explicit agenda against male violence, specifically male sexual violence, in a treatise on rape. Her work has been referred to as "groundbreaking" due to its framing of rape as a social problem; it also had a fair number of critics, primarily from feminists of color, who took issue with Brownmiller's approach to race. Brownmiller's other major book, In Our Time (2000), is a history of women's liberation.

In academic circles, feminist theology was a growing interest. Phyllis Trible wrote extensively throughout the 1970s to critique biblical interpretation of the time, using a type of critique known as Rhetorical criticism. Trible's analysis of biblical text seeks to explain that the bible itself is not sexist, but that it is centuries of sexism in societies that have produced this narrative.

=== Sexual politics ===
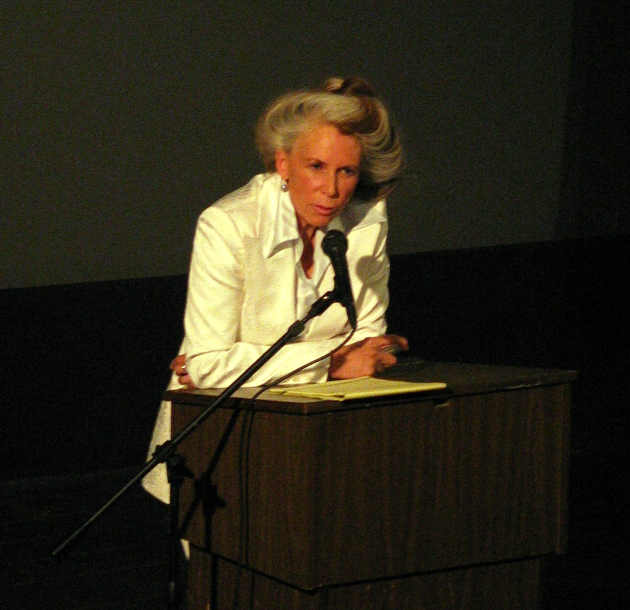
Catharine MacKinnon

Lesbianism during the second wave was visible within and without feminism. Lesbians felt sidelined by both gay liberation and women's liberation, where they were referred to by Betty Friedan as a "lavender menace", provoking "The Woman-Identified Woman", a 1970 manifesto from the Radicalesbians that put lesbian women at the forefront of the liberation movement. In January 1971, the National Organization for Women refused to endorse the Fifth Street Women's Building Takeover, one of the most feminist protests of the decade, because many of the organizers were lesbian and wanted to establish a lesbian center. A few years later, Jill Johnston's 1973 Lesbian Nation: The Feminist Solution argued for lesbian separatism, a practice by which lesbian women would separate themselves from the rest of society.

In reproductive rights, feminists sought the right to contraceptives (i.e., birth control), some of which were widely restricted in the US until the late 1960s and through the 1970s; the birth control pill, for example, was primarily available only to married women until the mid 1970s, though other women did find ways to get the pill anyhow. Access to abortion was also widely demanded so as to increase women's economic independence and bodily autonomy, but was more difficult to secure due to existing, deep societal divisions over the issue.

Shulamith Firestone, active during the second wave of feminism, argued reproductive technology is connected to reproductive rights. Firestone believed in the enhancement of technologically concerning reproduction, in order to eliminate the obligation for women to reproduce and end oppression and inequality against them.

Susan Griffin was one of the first feminists to write on pornography's implications in her 1981 Pornography and Silence. Beyond Brownmiller and Griffin's positions, Catharine MacKinnon and Andrea Dworkin influenced debates and activism around pornography and prostitution, particularly at the Supreme Court of Canada. MacKinnon, a lawyer, has stated, "To be about to be raped is to be gender female in the process of going about life as usual." She explained sexual harassment by saying that it "doesn't mean that they [harassers] all want to fuck us, they just want to hurt us, dominate us, and control us, and that is fucking us." According to Pauline B. Bart, some people see radical feminism as the only movement that truly expresses the pain of being a woman in an unequal society, as it portrays that reality with the experiences of the battered and violated, which they claim to be the norm. Critics, including some feminists, civil libertarians, and jurists, have found this position uncomfortable and alienating.

This approach has evolved to transform the research and perspective on rape from an individual experience into a social problem.

=== Expanding feminism ===
Starting in the 1970s, second-wave leaders and writers such as Gloria Anzaldúa, bell hooks, Cherríe Moraga, Audre Lorde, Maxine Hong Kingston, and other feminists of color called for a new subjectivity in feminist voice. Hijas de Cuauntemoc was a student-led Chicana feminist newspaper founded in 1971. Named after an underground newspaper written by women during the 1910 Mexican Revolution, this publication was a crucial part of the burgeoning Chicana feminist movement.

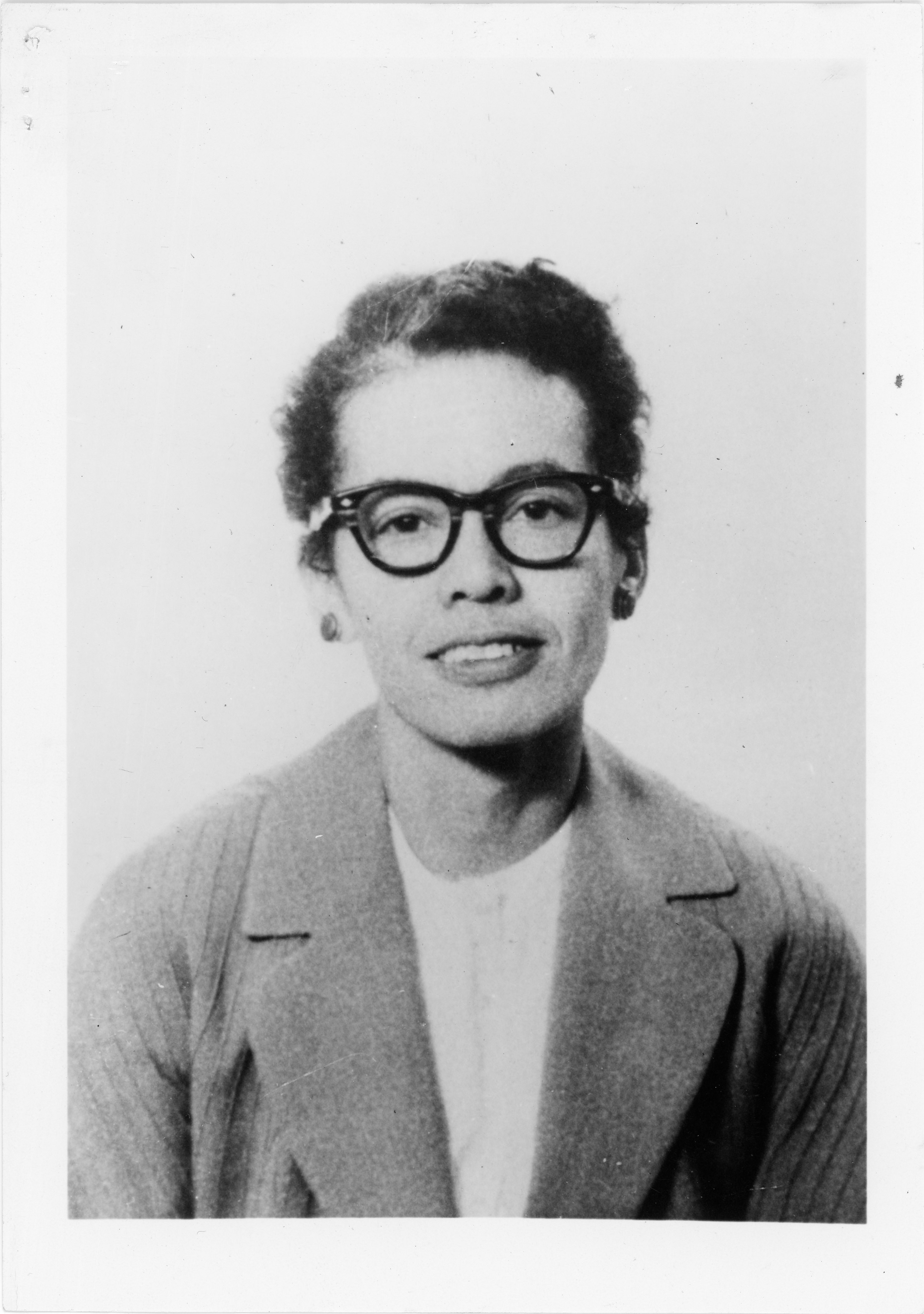
Dr. Pauli Murray

Black feminist scholars and writers like Pauli Murray, Audre Lorde, Beverly Smith and Barbara Smith "developed theoretical frameworks to serve as a model for other women of color, to broaden feminism's definition and scope." Murray—whose biographer has said she would likely identify as transgender had she lived in a later era—originated the term "Jane Crow" to acknowledge the dual oppressions faced by Black women. Lorde addressed the interconnected nature of race, gender, class, disability, and sexuality. Lorde, Moraga, Barbara Smith and Beverly Smith cofounded the pioneering Kitchen Table Press, which published work from LGBTQ women of color. Its most popular books also became canonical texts of second wave feminism: This Bridge Called My Back: Writings by Radical Women of Color, an anthology by Anzaldúa and Moraga, Home Girls: A Black Feminist Anthology, by Barbara Smith, and I Am Your Sister by Lorde.

In 1973, Eleanor Holmes Norton, Floryence Kennedy, Faith Ringgold, Margaret Sloan-Hunter, and Doris Wright founded the National Black Feminist Organization with the aim to "address ourselves to the particular and specific needs of the larger, but almost cast-aside half of the black race in Amerikka, the Black woman." In Sloan-Hunter's words, the group would add credibility to the women's liberation movement while reminding "the black-liberation movement that there can't be liberation for half a race."

In 1974, Black feminists in Boston started the Combahee River Collective to address issues of race, class, gender and homophobia in both the civil rights and women's movements. In 1977, they issued the Combahee River Collective Statement, coauthored by Barbara Smith, which outlined interlocking systems of oppression and became a key foundational document in Black feminist and queer theory.

Also in 1974, Rev. Delores Jackson founded Salsa Soul Sisters in New York City, the first organization in the US focused on lesbians of color. The group was composed primarily of Black lesbians, and was inclusive of Latina, indigenous, and Asian American women as well as those who identified as gay or bisexual.

=== Third wave ===
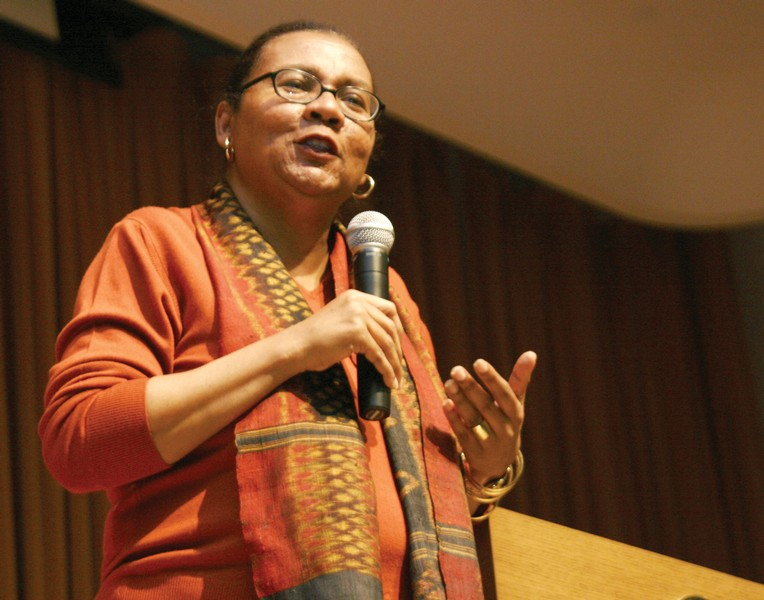
bell hooks

Third-wave feminism began in the early 1990s in response to what young women perceived as shortcomings or unfulfilled promises of the second-wave as well as ongoing misogyny in the culture The term "third wave" was coined by a collective of women—including writer Rebecca Walker, daughter of author and second-wave feminist Alice Walker—who wanted feminism to interrogate issues of sex, race, gender identity and class. Third-wave feminists sought to challenge or avoid second-wave "essentialist" definitions of femininity, which over-emphasized the experiences of white, upper-middle-class women. A post-structuralist interpretation of gender and sexuality, or an understanding of gender as outside binary maleness and femaleness, was central to much of the third wave's ideology. Additionally, third-wave feminists often challenged what they saw as binary second-wave paradigms around sexuality, gender identity and power.

This focus on the intersection between race and gender became more widely discussed in mainstream American culture in 1991 when professor Anita Hill's allegations of sexual harassment against Clarence Thomas led to hearings during his nomination to the Supreme Court.

In 1991, Kimberlé Crenshaw, a professor who was part of Anita Hill's legal team wrote Mapping the Margins, which articulated the concept of intersectionality, who described how interlocking systems of power affect those who are most marginalized in society.

==== Sexual politics ====
Third-wave feminists also fought to hasten social acceptance of female sexual freedom. As societal norms allowed men to have multiple sexual partners without rebuke, feminists sought sexual equality for that freedom and encouraged "sexual liberation" for women, including sex for pleasure with multiple partners, if desired.

=== Fourth wave ===
Fourth-wave feminism has been identified as starting approximately in 2008 and continues into the present day. Definitions vary, but it tends to be characterized by a focus on women's empowerment and intersectionality, greater inclusivity of trans and nonbinary identities, and is set apart from earlier eras by its use of technology to build and grow the movement. Professors Leslie Haywood and Jennifer Drake have written, "the definitional moment of third-wave feminism has been theorized as proceeding from critiques of the white women's movement that were initiated by women of color, as well as from the many instances of coalition work undertaken by U.S. third world feminists." Researcher Diana Diamond alternatively defines fourth-wave feminism as a movement that "combines politics, psychology, and spirituality in an overarching vision of change."

==== Arguments for a new wave ====
In 2005, Pythia Peay first argued for the existence of a fourth wave of feminism, combining justice with religious spirituality. According to author Jennifer Baumgardner, a fourth wave, incorporating online resources such as social media, may have begun in 2008, inspired partly by Take Our Daughters to Work Days. This fourth wave has inspired or been associated with: the Doula Project for children's services; post-abortion talk lines; pursuit of reproductive justice; plus-size fashion support; support for transgender rights; male feminism; disability justice; sex work acceptance; and developing media including Feministing, Racialicious, blogs, and Twitter campaigns.

According to journalist Kira Cochrane, a fourth wave had appeared in the U.K. and several other nations by 2012–13. It focused on: sexual inequality as manifested in "street harassment, sexual harassment, workplace discrimination[,] ... body-shaming"; media images, "online misogyny", "assault[s] on public transport"; on intersectionality; on social media technology for communication and online petitioning for organizing; and on the perception, inherited from prior waves, that individual experiences are shared and thus can have political solutions. Cochrane identified as fourth wave such organizations and websites as the Everyday Sexism Project and UK Feminista; and events such as Reclaim the Night, One Billion Rising, and "a Lose the Lads' mags protest", where "many of [the leaders] ... are in their teens and 20s".

In 2014, Betty Dodson, one of the leaders of the early 1980s pro-sex feminist movement, said that she considered herself a fourth wave feminist. Dodson asserted that previous waves of feminist were banal and anti-sexual, and that her work gained a fresh lease on life with a new audience of young, successful women who had never had an orgasm.

In 2014, Rhiannon Lucy Cosslett and Holly Baxter, self-described fourth-wave feminists, released a book, The Vagenda, which aimed to debunk stereotypes of femininity promoted by the mainstream women's press.

==== The Everyday Sexism Project ====
The Everyday Sexism Project began as a social media campaign on 16 April 2012 by Laura Bates, a British feminist writer. The aim of the site was to document everyday examples of sexism as reported by contributors around the world. Bates established the Everyday Sexism Project as an open forum where women could post their experiences of harassment. Bates explains the Everyday Sexism Project's goal, "The project was never about solving sexism. It was about getting people to take the first step of just realising there is a problem that needs to be fixed."

The website was such a success that Bates decided to write and publish a book, Everyday Sexism, which further emphasizes the importance of having this type of online forum for women. The book provides unique insight into the vibrant movement of the upcoming fourth wave and the untold stories that women shared through the Everyday Sexism Project.

==== #MeToo Movement ====
The #MeToo movement is a social movement against sexual abuse, sexual harassment and rape culture, in which survivors share their lived experience of sexual abuse or harassment. The hashtag #MeToo was first used by activist and sexual assault survivor Tarana Burke in 2006, and spread virally in 2017 after being used on Twitter by high-profile accounts.

=== Criticisms of the wave metaphor ===
In 2010, Linda Nicholson, professor of women's studies at Washington University, critiqued the wave metaphor. She noted:

The wave metaphor tends to have built into it an important metaphorical implication that is historically misleading and not helpful politically. That implication is that underlying certain historical differences, there is one phenomenon, feminism, that unites gender activism in the history of the United States, and that like a wave, peaks at certain times and recedes at others. In sum, the wave metaphor suggests the idea that gender activism in the history of the United States has been for the most part unified around one set of ideas, and that set of ideas can be called feminism.

Instead, she suggested that the history of feminism in the US be analogized to a kaleidoscope, in which at any given moment, certain patterns and colors are more (or less) evident. Jo Reger, professor of sociology at Oakland University, has also noted that the wave metaphor can also lead generations of feminist activists to view their forebears "through a lens of opposition and difference".

=== Global feminism ===
==== UN conferences on women ====
In 1946, the United Nations established a Commission on the Status of Women, which later joined the UN Economic and Social Council (ECOSOC). In 1948, the UN issued its Universal Declaration of Human Rights, which protects "the equal rights of men and women". Starting with the 1975 World Conference of the International Women's Year in Mexico City during their Decade for Women (1975–1985), the UN has held a series of world conferences on women's issues. These conferences have worldwide female representation and provide considerable opportunity to advance women's rights. They also illustrate deep cultural divisions and disagreement on universal principles and priorities, as evidenced by the successive Copenhagen (1980) and Nairobi (1985) conferences. Intrafeminist debate and division centered on issues including economic development, attitudes towards forms of oppression, the definition of feminism, and stances on homosexuality, female circumcision, and population control.

The Nairobi convention revealed a less monolithic feminism that "constitutes the political expression of the concerns and interests of women from different regions, classes, nationalities, and ethnic backgrounds. There is and must be a diversity of feminisms, responsive to the different needs and concerns of women, and defined by them for themselves. This diversity builds on a common opposition to gender oppression and hierarchy which, however, is only the first step in articulating and acting upon a political agenda."

The fourth conference was held in Beijing in 1995, where the Beijing Platform for Action was signed. This included a commitment to achieve "gender equality and the empowerment of women" through "gender mainstreaming", or letting women and men "experience equal conditions for realising their full human rights, and have the opportunity to contribute and benefit from national, political, economic, social and cultural development".

==== Bridging East and West ====
Transnational feminist scholars such as Chela Sandoval, Trinh T. Minh-ha, Inderpal Grewel, and Chandra Mohanty have critiqued class-bias, racism, and Eurocentrism among feminists, and their theories of multiplicity and difference dismantle the idea of monolithic feminism. In her book, Scattered Hegemonies: Postmodernity and Transnational Feminist Practice, Grewel and coauthor Caren Kaplan wrote:

These transnational feminist scholars enable us to rethink the way we construct and write the history of feminists in national and transnational contexts. Seeking to articulate transnational connections among women, they have suggested ways to move beyond constructed oppositions without ignoring the histories that informed these conflicts or the valid concerns about power relations that have represented or structured the conflicts up to this point.

Even though Asian women found it difficult to relate completely with western white women's problems, they related much with the women of color, and thus remolded it and built a bridge between both halves of feminism, the eastern and western, via interconnectedness among women around the world. They adapted and borrowed the 'western' ideas of feminism and women in the west incorporated the effects of women's movements in other parts of the world, while reinventing itself. Asian feminists acknowledged the need of recognizing multiple sources of domination in women's lives all across the world, refused to universalize women's experience as one, and instead recognized the differences among them due to different social locations. They claimed that although academic feminism introduced them to the idea of feminism, it failed to bring them closer to the sisters and mothers in their lives, and rather took them further away. Some have also argued that many goals of western feminism are not enough to assess women's progress in Asia because they are not necessarily relevant or exportable across the boundaries. Thus, they redefined it as one that drew upon their heritage, history, and experiences.

== National histories of feminism ==
=== France ===
The 18th century French Revolution's focus on égalité (equality) extended to the inequities faced by French women. The writer Olympe de Gouges amended the 1791 Declaration of the Rights of Man and of the Citizen into the Declaration of the Rights of Woman and of the Female Citizen, where she argued that women accountable to the law must also bear equal responsibility under the law. She also addressed marriage as a social contract between equals and attacked women's reliance on beauty and charm as a form of slavery. Two years later, she was executed by guillotine.

The 19th century, conservative, post-Revolution France was inhospitable for feminist ideas, as expressed in the counter-revolutionary writings on the role of women by Joseph de Maistre and Viscount Louis de Bonald. Advancement came mid-century under the 1848 revolution and the proclamation of the Second Republic, which introduced male suffrage amid hopes that similar benefits would apply to women. Although the Utopian Charles Fourier is considered a feminist writer of this period, his influence was minimal at the time. With the fall of the conservative Louis-Philippe in 1848, feminist hopes were raised, as in 1790. Movement newspapers and organizations appeared, such as Eugénie Niboyet's La Voix des Femmes (The Women's Voice), the first feminist daily newspaper in France. Niboyet was a Protestant who had adopted Saint-Simonianism, and La Voix attracted other women from that movement, including the seamstress Jeanne Deroin and the primary schoolteacher Pauline Roland. Unsuccessful attempts were also made to recruit George Sand. Feminism was treated as a threat due to its ties with socialism, which was scrutinized since the Revolution. Deroin and Roland were both arrested, tried, and imprisoned in 1849. With the emergence of a new, more conservative government in 1852, feminism would have to wait until the Third French Republic.

While the word féminisme previously existed to describe the qualities of women, the word féministe was coined in 1872 by Alexandre Dumas fils to refer to liberated women.

The Groupe Français d'Etudes Féministes were women intellectuals at the beginning of the 20th century who translated part of Bachofen's canon into French and campaigned for the family law reform. In 1905, they founded L'entente, which published articles on women's history, and became the focus for the intellectual avant-garde. It advocated for women's entry into higher education and the male-dominated professions. Meanwhile, the Parti Socialiste Féminin socialist feminists, adopted a Marxist version of matriarchy. Like the Groupe Français, they toiled for a new age of equality, not for a return to prehistoric models of matriarchy. French feminism of the late 20th century is mainly associated with psychoanalytic feminist theory, particularly the work of Luce Irigaray, Julia Kristeva, and Hélène Cixous.

=== Germany ===
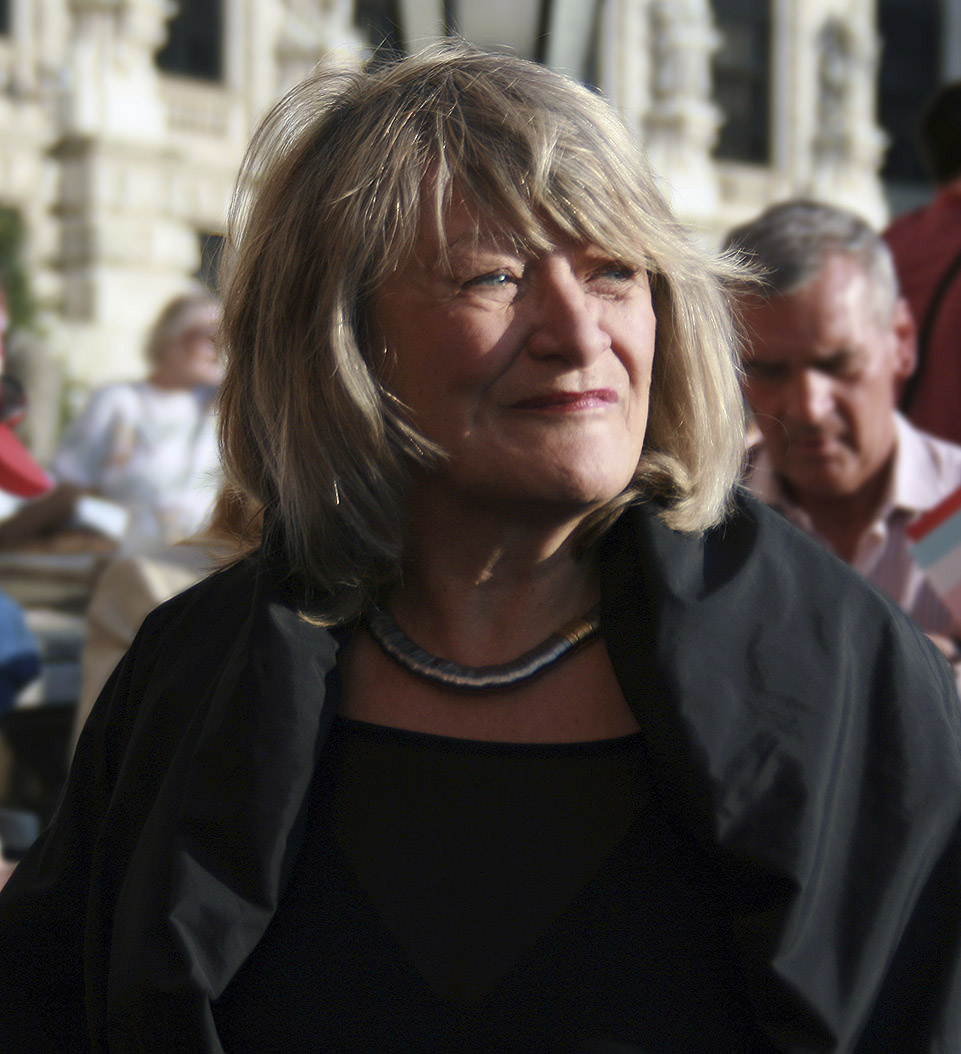
Alice Schwarzer, 2009

Modern feminism in Germany began during the Wilhelmine period (1888–1918) with feminists pressuring a range of traditional institutions, from universities to government, to open their doors to women. The organized German women's movement is widely attributed to writer and feminist Louise Otto-Peters (1819–1895). This movement culminated in women's suffrage in 1919. Later waves of feminists continued to ask for legal and social equality in public and family life. Alice Schwarzer is the most prominent contemporary German feminist.

=== Iran ===
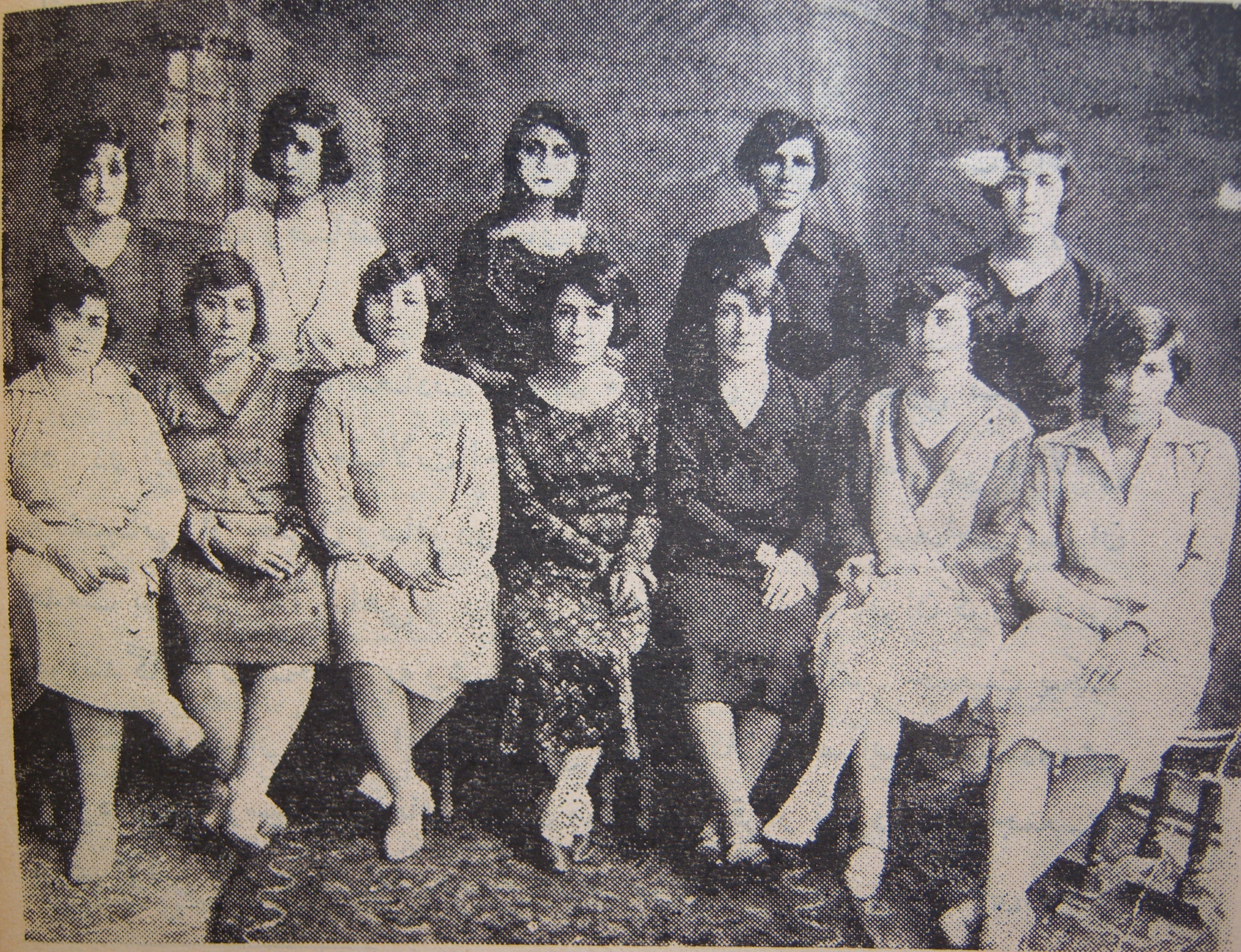
Board of directors of "Jam'iat e nesvan e vatan-khah", a women's rights association in Tehran (1923–1933)

The Iranian women's rights movement first emerged some time after the Iranian Constitutional Revolution, in the year in which the first women's journal was published, 1910. The status of women deteriorated after the 1979 Iranian Revolution. The movement later grew again under feminist figures such as Bibi Khanoom Astarabadi, Touba Azmoudeh, Sediqeh Dowlatabadi, Mohtaram Eskandari, Roshank No'doost, Afaq Parsa, Fakhr ozma Arghoun, Shahnaz Azad, Noor-ol-Hoda Mangeneh, Zandokht Shirazi, Maryam Amid (Mariam Mozayen-ol Sadat).

In 1992, Shahla Sherkat founded Zanan (Women) magazine, which covered Iranian women's concerns and tested political boundaries with edgy reportage on reform politics, domestic abuse, and sex. It is the most important Iranian women's journal published after the Iranian revolution. It systematically criticized the Islamic legal code and argued that gender equality is Islamic and religious literature had been misread and misappropriated by misogynists. Mehangiz Kar, Shahla Lahiji, and Shahla Sherkat, the editor of Zanan, lead the debate on women's rights and demanded reforms. On August 27, 2006, the One Million Signatures Iranian women's rights campaign was started. It aims to end legal discrimination against women in Iranian laws by collecting a million signatures. The campaign supporters include many Iranian women's rights activists, international activists, and Nobel laureates. The most important post-revolution feminist figures are Mehrangiz Kar, Azam Taleghani, Shahla Sherkat, Parvin Ardalan, Noushin Ahmadi khorasani, and Shadi Sadr.

=== Egypt ===
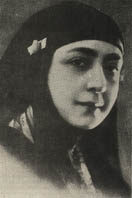
Huda Shaarawi, founder of the Egyptian Feminist Union

In 1899, Qasim Amin, considered the "father" of Arab feminism, wrote The Liberation of Women, which argued for legal and social reforms for women. Hoda Shaarawi founded the Egyptian Feminist Union in 1923 and became its president and a symbol of the Arab women's rights movement. Arab feminism was closely connected with Arab nationalism. In 1956, President Gamal Abdel Nasser's government initiated "state feminism", which outlawed gender-based discrimination and granted women's suffrage. Despite these reforms, "state feminism" blocked feminist political activism and brought an end to the first-wave feminist movement in Egypt. During Anwar Sadat's presidency, his wife, Jehan Sadat, publicly advocated for expansion of women's rights, though Egyptian policy and society was in retreat from women's equality with the new Islamist movement and growing conservatism. However, writers such as Al Ghazali Harb, for example, argued that women's full equality is an important part of Islam. This position formed a new feminist movement, Islamic feminism, which is still active today.

=== India ===
A new generation of Indian feminists emerged following global feminism. Indian women have greater independence from increased access to higher education and control over their reproductive rights. Medha Patkar, Madhu Kishwar, and Brinda Karat are feminist social workers and politicians who advocate for women's rights in post-independence India. Writers such as Amrita Pritam, Sarojini Sahoo, and Kusum Ansal advocate for feminist ideas in Indian languages. Rajeshwari Sunder Rajan, Leela Kasturi, and Vidyut Bhagat are Indian feminist essayists and critics writing in English.

=== China ===
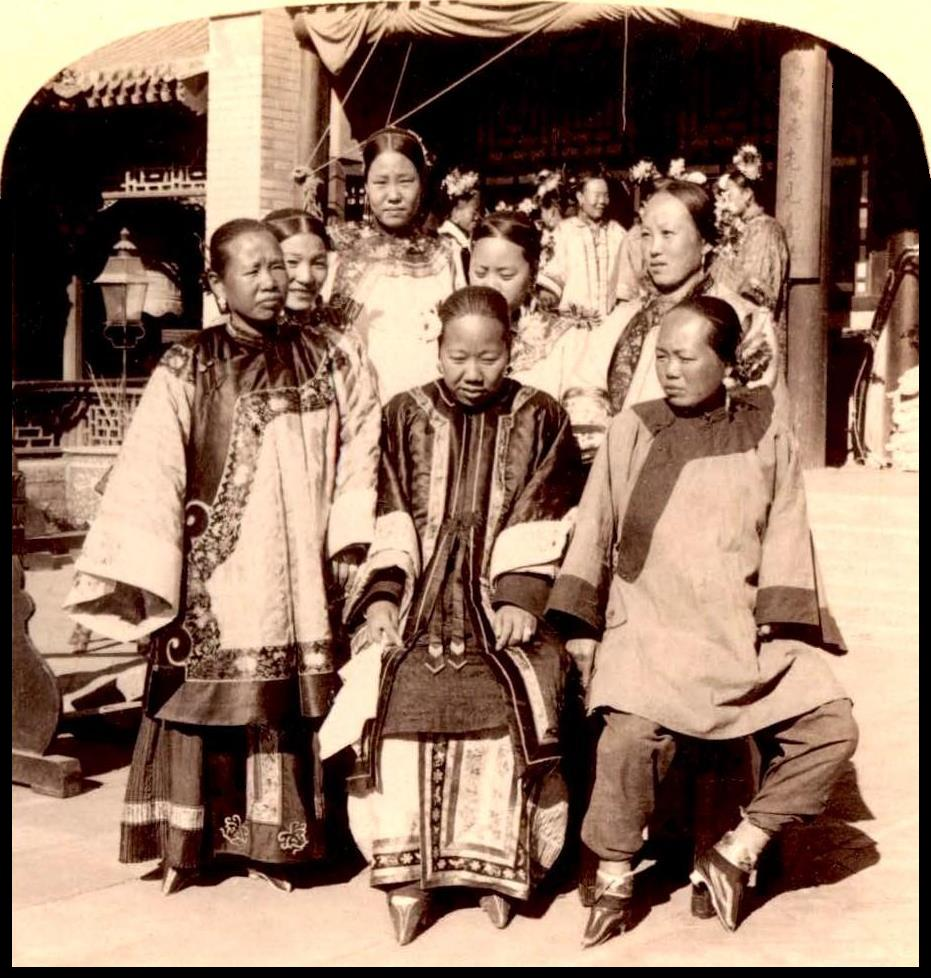
Wealthy Chinese women with bound feet (Beijing, 1900). Foot binding was a symbol of women's oppression during the reform movements in the 19th and 20th centuries.

Feminism in China began in the late Qing period as Chinese society re-evaluated traditional and Confucian values such as foot binding and gender segregation, and began to reject traditional gender ideas as hindering progress towards modernization. During the 1898 Hundred Days' Reform, reformers called for women's education, gender equality, and the end of foot binding. Female reformers formed the first Chinese women's society, the Society for the Diffusion of Knowledge among Chinese Women (Nüxuehui). After the Qing dynasty's collapse, women's liberation became a goal of the May Fourth Movement and the New Culture Movement. Later, the Chinese Communist Revolution adopted women's liberation as one of its aims and promoted women's equality, especially regarding women's participation in the workforce. After the revolution and progress in integrating women into the workforce, the Chinese Communist Party claimed to have successfully achieved women's liberation, and women's inequality was no longer seen as a problem.

Second- and third-wave feminism in China was characterized by a re-examination of women's roles during the reform movements of the early 20th century and the ways in which feminism was adopted by those various movements in order to achieve their goals. Later and current feminists have questioned whether gender equality has actually been fully achieved, and discuss current gender problems, such as the large gender disparity in the population.

=== Japan ===
Japanese feminism as an organized political movement dates back to the early years of the 20th century when Kato Shidzue pushed for birth control availability as part of a broad spectrum of progressive reforms. Shidzue went on to serve in the National Diet following the defeat of Japan in World War II and the promulgation of the Peace Constitution by US forces. Other figures such as Hayashi Fumiko and Ariyoshi Sawako illustrate the broad socialist ideologies of Japanese feminism that seeks to accomplish broad goals rather than celebrate the individual achievements of powerful women.

=== Norway ===
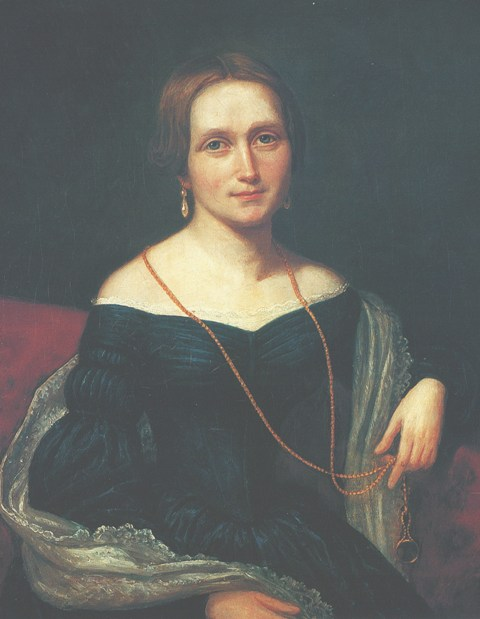
Camilla Collett

Norwegian feminism's political origins are in the women's suffrage movement. Camilla Collett (1813–1895) is widely considered the first Norwegian feminist. Originating from a literary family, she wrote a novel and several articles on the difficulties facing women of her time, and, in particular, forced marriages. Amalie Skram (1846–1905), a naturalist writer, also served as the women's voice.

The Norwegian Association for Women's Rights was founded in 1884 by Gina Krog and Hagbart Berner. The organization raised issues related to women's rights to education and economic self-determination, and, above all, universal suffrage. The Norwegian Parliament passed the women's right to vote into law on June 11, 1913. Norway was the second country in Europe (after Finland) to have full suffrage for women.

=== Poland ===
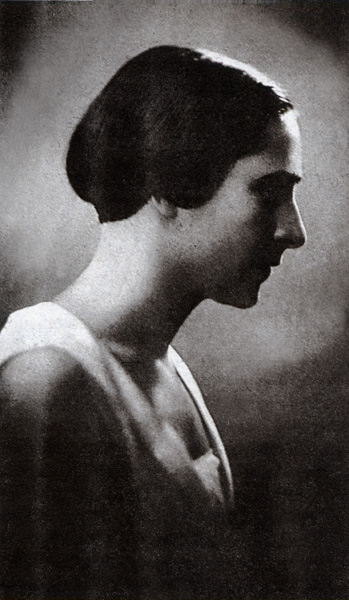
Irena Krzywicka

The development of feminism in Poland (re-recreated in modern times in 1918) and Polish territories has traditionally been divided into seven successive "waves".

Radical feminism emerged in 1920s Poland. Its chief representatives, Irena Krzywicka and Maria Morozowicz-Szczepkowska, advocated for women's personal, social, and legal independence from men. Krzywicka and Tadeusz Żeleński both promoted planned parenthood, sexual education, rights to divorce and abortion, and equality of sexes. Krzywicka published a series of articles in Wiadomości Literackie in which she protested against interference by the Roman Catholic Church in the intimate lives of Poles.

After the Second World War, the Polish Communist state (established in 1948) forcefully promoted women's emancipation at home and at work. However, during Communist rule (until 1989), feminism in general and second-wave feminism in particular were practically absent. Although feminist texts were produced in the 1950s and afterwards, they were usually controlled and generated by the Communist state. After the fall of Communism, the Polish government, dominated by Catholic political parties, introduced a de facto legal ban on abortions. Since then, some feminists have adopted argumentative strategies from the 1980s American pro-choice movement.

== Histories of selected feminist issues ==
=== Feminist theory ===
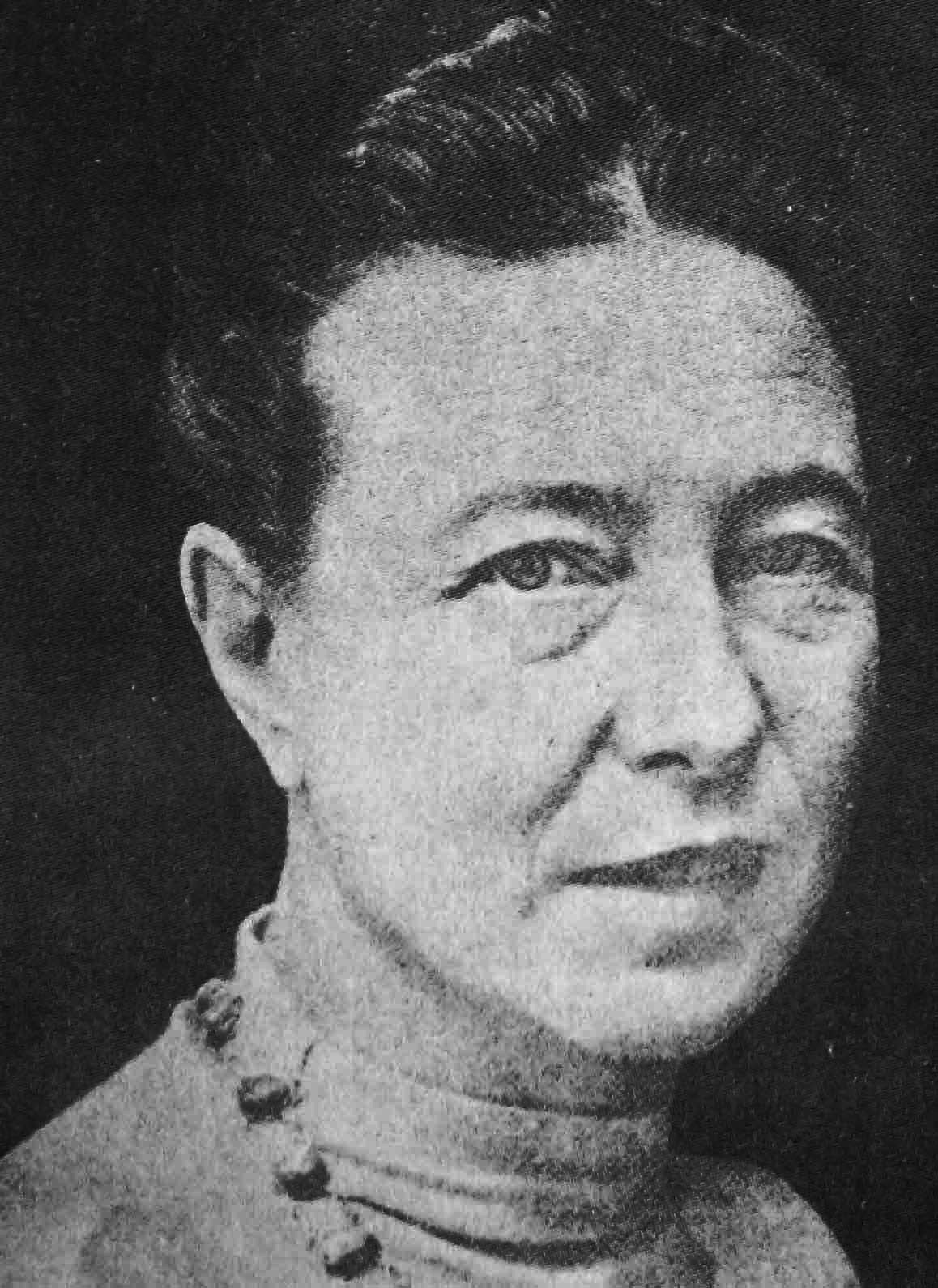
Simone de Beauvoir

The sexuality and gender historian Nancy Cott distinguishes between modern feminism and its antecedents, particularly the struggle for suffrage. She argues that in the two decades surrounding the Nineteenth Amendment's 1920 passage, the prior woman movement primarily concerned women as universal entities, whereas over this 20-year period, the movement prioritized social differentiation, attention to individuality, and diversity. New issues dealt more with gender as a social construct, gender identity, and relationships within and between genders. Politically, this represented a shift from an ideological alignment comfortable with the right, to one more radically associated with the left.

In the immediate postwar period, Simone de Beauvoir opposed the "woman in the home" norm. She introduced an existentialist dimension to feminism with the publication of Le Deuxième Sexe (The Second Sex) in 1949. While less an activist than a philosopher and novelist, she signed one of the Mouvement de Libération des Femmes manifestos.

The resurgence of feminist activism in the late 1960s was accompanied by an emerging literature of what might be considered female-associated issues, such as concerns for the earth, spirituality, and environmental activism. The atmosphere this created reignited the study of and debate on matricentricity as a rejection of determinism, such as with Adrienne Rich in Of Woman Born and Marilyn French in Beyond Power. For socialist feminists like Evelyn Reed, patriarchy held the properties of capitalism.

Ann Taylor Allen describes the differences between the collective male pessimism of male intellectuals such as Ferdinand Tönnies, Max Weber, and Georg Simmel at the beginning of the 20th century, compared to the optimism of their female counterparts, whose contributions have largely been ignored by social historians of the era.

== See also ==
- Coverture
- Feminist history
- History of brassieres
- Lesbian erasure
- List of suffragists and suffragettes
- List of women's rights activists
- List of women's organizations
- Mujeres Libres
- New Woman
- Timeline of second-wave feminism
- Timeline of women's suffrage
- Timeline of women's rights (other than voting)
- Victorian dress reform
- Women's music
- Women's suffrage organizations
- Women's rights in 2014
- 1975 Icelandic women's strike

== Bibliography ==
=== General ===
==== Books ====
- Cott, Nancy F. The Bonds of Womanhood. New Haven: Yale University Press, 1977.
- Cott, Nancy F. The Grounding of Modern Feminism. New Haven: Yale University Press, 1987.
- Duby, George and Perrot, Michelle (eds). A History of Women in the West. 5 vols. Harvard, 1992-4
  - I. From Ancient Goddesses to Christian Saints
  - II. Silences of the Middle Ages
  - III. Renaissance and the Enlightenment Paradoxes
  - IV. Emerging Feminism from Revolution to World War
  - V. Toward a Cultural Identity in the Twentieth Century
- Ezell, Margaret J. M. Writing Women's Literary History. Johns Hopkins University, 2006. 216 pp. ISBN 0-8018-5508-X
- Foot, Paul. The Vote: How it was won and how it was lost. London: Viking, 2005
- Freedman, Estelle No Turning Back: The History of Feminism and the Future of Women, Ballantine Books, 2002, ASIN B0001FZGQC
- Fulford, Roger. Votes for Women. London: Faber and Faber, 1957
- Jacob, Margaret C. The Enlightenment: A Brief History With Documents, Bedford/St. Martin's, 2001, ISBN 0-312-17997-9
- Kramarae, Cheris and Paula Treichler. A Feminist Dictionary. University of Illinois, 1997. ISBN 0-252-06643-X
- Lerner, Gerda. The Creation of Feminist Consciousness From the Middle Ages to Eighteen-seventy. Oxford University Press, 1993
- McQuiston, Liz. Suffragettes and She-devils: Women's liberation and beyond. London: Phaidon, 1997
- Mill, John Stuart. The Subjection of Women. Okin, Susan M (ed.). Newhaven, CT: Yale, 1985
- Prince, Althea and Susan Silva-Wayne (eds). Feminisms and Womanisms: A Women's Studies Reader. Women's Press, 2004. ISBN 0-88961-411-3
- Radical Women. The Radical Women Manifesto: Socialist Feminist Theory, Program and Organizational Structure. Red Letter Press, 2001. ISBN 0-932323-11-1
- Rossi, Alice S. The Feminist Papers: from Adams to Beauvoir. Boston: Northeastern University, 1973. ISBN 1-55553-028-1
- Rowbotham, Sheilah. A Century of Women. Viking, London 1997
- Schneir, Miriam. Feminism: The Essential Historical Writings. Vintage, 1994. ISBN 0-679-75381-8
- Scott, Joan Wallach Feminism and History (Oxford Readings in Feminism), Oxford University Press, 1996, ISBN 0-19-875169-9
- Smith, Bonnie G. Global Feminisms: A Survey of Issues and Controversies (Rewriting Histories), Routledge, 2000, ISBN 0-415-18490-8
- Spender, Dale (ed.). Feminist Theorists: Three centuries of key women thinkers, Pantheon, 1983, ISBN 0-394-53438-7

==== Articles ====
- Allen, Ann Taylor. "Feminism, Social Science, and the Meanings of Modernity: The Debate on the Origin of the Family in Europe and the United States, 1860–1914". The American Historical Review, 1999 October 104(4)
- Cott, Nancy F. "Feminist Politics in the 1920s: The National Woman's Party". Journal of American History 71 (June 1984): 43–68.
- Cott, Nancy F. "What's In a Name? The Limits of 'Social Feminism'; or, Expanding the Vocabulary of Women's History". Journal of American History 76 (December 1989): 809–829.
- Hicks, Philip (August 13, 2014). "Women Worthies and Feminist Argument in Eighteenth-Century Britain". Women's History Review. 24 (2): 174–190. doi:10.1080/09612025.2014.945795. S2CID 144541736.
- Offen, Karen. "Defining Feminism: A Comparative Historical Approach". Signs 1988 Autumn 14(1):119-57

=== International ===
- Parpart, Jane L., Conelly, M. Patricia, Barriteau, V. Eudine (eds). Theoretical Perspectives on Gender and Development. Ottawa: IDRC, 2000. ISBN 0-88936-910-0

==== Europe ====
- Anderson, Bonnie S. and Judith P. Zinsser. A History of Their Own: Women in Europe from Prehistory to the Present, Oxford University Press, 1999 (revised edition), ISBN 0-19-512839-7
- Offen, Karen M. European Feminisms, 1700–1950: A Political History. Stanford: Stanford University Press. 2000
- Perincioli, Cristina. Berlin wird feministisch. Das Beste, was von der 68er-Bewegung blieb. Querverlag, Berlin 2015, ISBN 978-3-89656-232-6, free access to complete English translation: http://feministberlin1968ff.de/ Archived March 15, 2017, at the Wayback Machine

==== Great Britain ====
- Caine, Barbara. Victorian Feminists. Oxford, 1992
- Chandrasekhar, S. "A Dirty, Filfthy Book": The Writing of Charles Knowlton and Annie Besant on Reproductive Physiology and British Control and an Account of the Bradlaugh-Besant Trial. University of California Berkeley, 1981
- Craik, Elizabeth M. (ed.). "Women and Marriage in Victorian England", in Marriage and Property. Aberdeen University, 1984
- Forster, Margaret. Significant Sisters: The grassroots of active feminism 1839-1939. Penguin, 1986
- Fraser, Antonia. The Weaker Vessel. NY: Vintage, 1985. ISBN 0-394-73251-0
- Hallam, David J.A., Taking on the Men: the first women parliamentary candidates 1918 Archived June 29, 2019, at the Wayback Machine, Studley, 2018 ISBN 978-1-85858-592-5
- Manvell, Roger. The Trial of Annie Besant and Charles Bradlaugh. London: Elek, 1976
- Pankhurst, Emmeline. My Own Story. London: Virago, 1979
- Pankhurst, Sylvia. The Suffragette Movement. London: Virago, 1977
- Phillips, Melanie. The Ascent of Woman – A History of the Suffragette Movement and the ideas behind it, London: Time Warner Book Group, 2003, ISBN 0-349-11660-1
- Pugh, Martin. Women and the Women's Movement in Britain, 1914 -1999, Basingstoke [etc.]: St. Martin's Press, 2000
- Walters, Margaret. Feminism: A very short introduction. Oxford, 2005 (ISBN 0-19-280510-X)

==== Italy ====
- Lucia Chiavola Birnbaum, Liberazione della Donna. Feminism in Italy, Wesleyan University Press, 1986

==== India ====
- Maitrayee Chaudhuri (ed.), Feminism in India, London [etc.]: Zed Books, 2005

==== Iran ====
- Edward G. Browne, The Persian Revolution of 1905-1909. Mage Publishers (July 1995). ISBN 0-934211-45-0
- Farideh Farhi, "Religious Intellectuals, the "Woman Question," and the Struggle for the Creation of a Democratic Public Sphere in Iran", International Journal of Politics, Culture and Society, Vol. 15, No.2, Winter 2001.
- Ziba Mir-Hosseini, "Religious Modernists and the 'Woman Question': Challenges and Complicities", Twenty Years of Islamic Revolution: Political and Social Transition in Iran since 1979, Syracuse University Press, 2002, pp 74–95.
- Shirin Ebadi, Iran Awakening: A Memoir of Revolution and Hope, Random House (May 2, 2006), ISBN 1-4000-6470-8

==== Japan ====
- Vera Mackie, Feminism in Modern Japan: Citizenship, Embodiment and Sexuality, Paperback edition, Cambridge University Press, 2003, ISBN 0-521-52719-8

==== Latin America ====
- Nancy Sternbach, "Feminism in Latin America: from Bogotá to San Bernardo", in: Signs, Winter 1992, pp. 393–434

==== United States ====
- Brownmiller, Susan. In Our Time: Memoir of a Revolution, Dial Books, 1999
- Cott, Nancy and Elizabeth Pleck (eds), A Heritage of Her Own; Toward a New Social History of American Women, New York: Simon and Schuster, 1979
- Echols, Alice. Daring to Be Bad: Radical Feminism in America, 1967-1975, University of Minnesota Press, 1990
- Flexner, Eleanor. Century of Struggle: The Woman's Rights Movement in the United States, Paperback Edition, Belknap Press 1996
- Fox-Genovese, Elizabeth., "Feminism Is Not the Story of My Life": How Today's Feminist Elite Has Lost Touch With the Real Concerns of Women, Doubleday, 1996
- Keetley, Dawn (ed.) Public Women, Public Words: A Documentary History of American Feminism. 3 vols.:
  - Vol. 1: Beginnings to 1900, Madison, Wisconsin: Madison House, 1997
  - Vol. 2: 1900 to 1960, Lanham, Md. [etc.]: Rowman & Littlefield, 2002
  - Vol. 3: 1960 to the present, Lanham, Md. [etc.]: Rowman & Littlefield, 2002
- Messer-Davidow, Ellen: Disciplining feminism: from social activism to academic discourse, Duke University Press, 2002
- O'Neill, William L. Everyone Was Brave: A history of feminism in America. Chicago 1971
- Roth, Benita. Separate Roads to Feminism: Black, Chicana, and White Feminist Movements in America's Second Wave, Cambridge University Press, 2004
- Stansell, Christine. The Feminist Promise: 1792 to the Present (2010). ISBN 978-0-679-64314-2, 528 pp.

=== Sexuality ===
- Foucault, Michel. The History of Sexuality. Random House, New York, 1978
- Soble, Alan (ed.) The Philosophy of Sex: Contemporary readings. Lanham, MD: & Littlefield, 2002. ISBN 0-7425-1346-7
