= Christine Stansell =

American historian (born 1949)

Christine Stansell (born 1949) is an American historian in women's and gender history; antebellum US social and political history; American cultural history; history of human rights; and post-catastrophic societies. She received her PhD from Yale University in 1979. She recently retired from teaching history at the University of Chicago, where she had lectured since 2007.

Stansell's books have received mostly positive reviews.

== Bibliography ==
- Stansell, Christine; Barr Snitow, Ann; Thompson, Sharon, eds. (1983). Powers of desire: the politics of sexuality. New York: Monthly Review Press. ISBN 9780853456100.
- Stansell, Christine (1987). City of Women: Sex and Class in New York, 1789–1860. Urbana: University of Illinois Press. ISBN 9780394515342.
- Stansell, Christine (2000). American Moderns: Bohemian New York and the Creation of a New Century. Princeton, New Jersey: Princeton University Press. ISBN 9780691142838.
- Stansell, Christine (2010). The Feminist Promise: 1792 to the Present. New York: Random House. ISBN 9780812972023.
