= Theodosia Monson, Baroness Monson =

British writer, painter, feminist, and companion of Matilda Hays (1803-1891)

Theodosia Monson, Baroness Monson of Burton (née Blacker; 23 July 1803, in Warkworth, Northumberland – 3 July 1891, in Malvern Wells, Worcestershire) was a promoter of women's rights, horsewoman, atheist and landscape painter. According to Sharon Marcus, she was the last companion of Matilda Hays.

== Biography ==
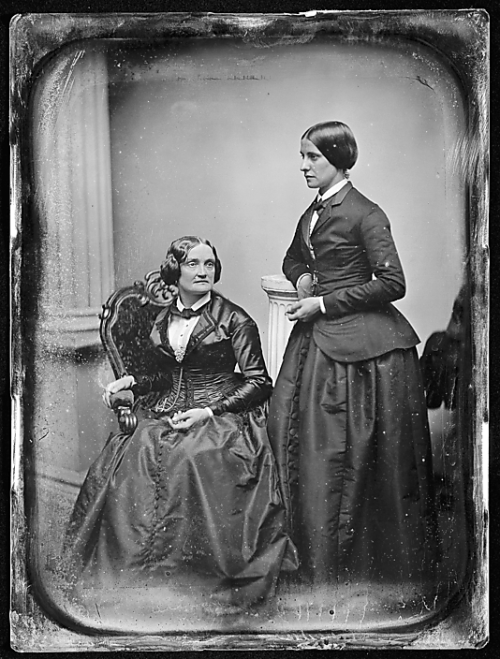
Charlotte Cushman & Matilda Hays, ca. 1855

Theodosia Blacker was born on 23 July 1803 at Warkworth, Northumberland, the fifth and youngest daughter of Major Latham Blacker (1765–1846) of Drogheda, Ireland, and subsequently of Newent, Gloucestershire, and Catherine Maddison (1769–1823). Her paternal grandparents were Latham Blacker (c. 1711 – post 1765) and Martha Beaver (died 1802). Her maternal grandfather was Colonel George Maddison of Lincolnshire. She had one sister, Catherine Blacker Onslow.

She married Frederick John Monson, 5th Baron Monson of Burton (1809–1841) on 21 June 1832 at St James's Church, Piccadilly in Westminster, London. Blacker took the name Monson and was styled as Baroness Monson of Burton. The married couple lived together for less than a week.

She was a friend of Anna Jameson and the married poets Elizabeth Barrett Browning and Robert Browning. She was the last companion of Matilda Hays (1820–1897), writer, journalist and part-time actress.

In December 1859, Baroness Monson rented and furnished a building as a meeting place in central London for like-minded women, a counterpart to the gentlemen's clubs that were then so popular. 19 Langham Place had a committee room, a reading room and a coffee shop open from 11am to 10pm. It served as an office for one of the first organisations of British women, the Society for Promoting the Employment of Women and its publication the English Woman's Journal. In 1860, it became "The Ladies Institute" managed by Sarah Lewin (1812–1898). The circle of women known as the Langham Place group included, in addition to Lady Monson and Matilda Hays, Helen Blackburn, Emily Faithfull, Maria Rye, Emily Davies, and Jessie Boucherett. At the end of 1863, Lady Monson refitted the place to be a house.

She died on 3 July 1891 at Malvern Wells, Worcestershire.

== Gallery ==
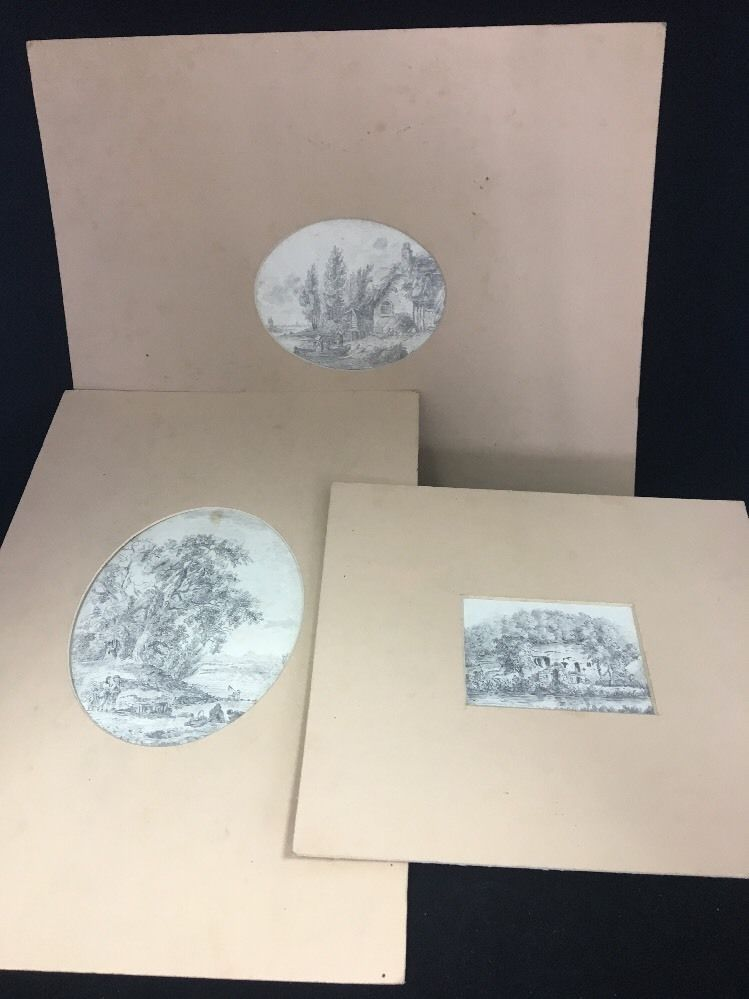

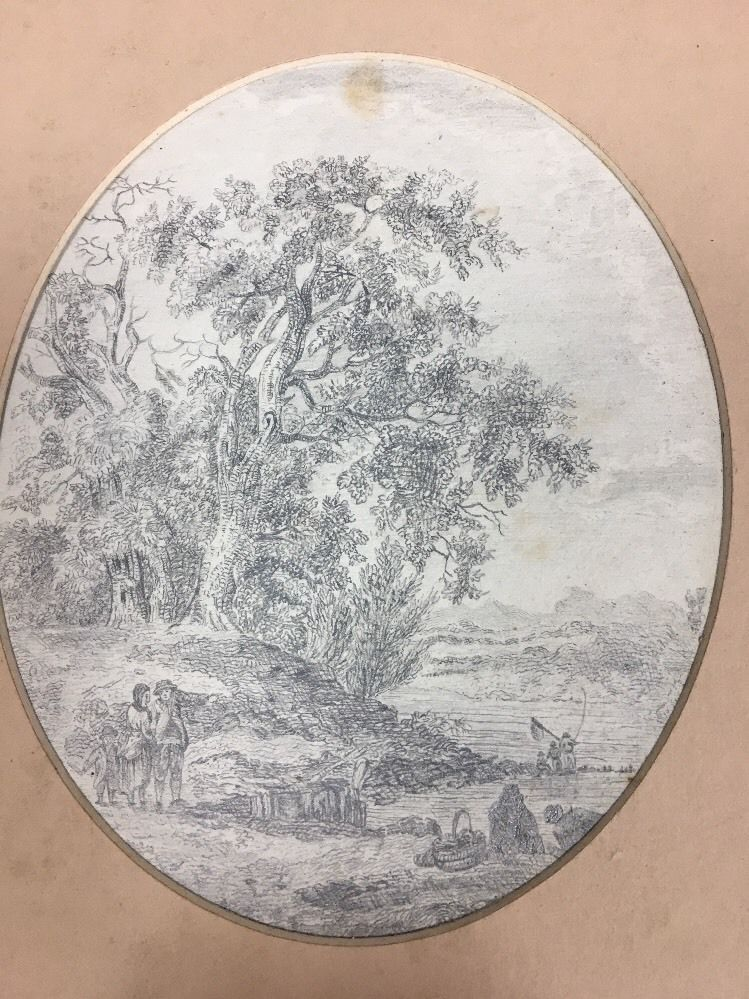

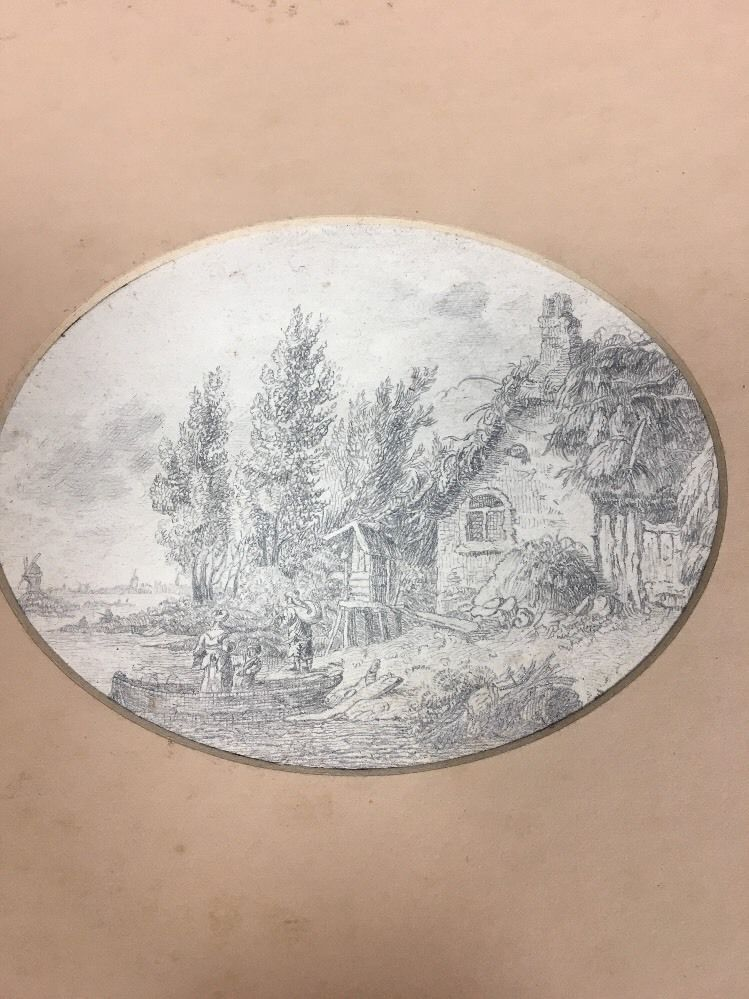

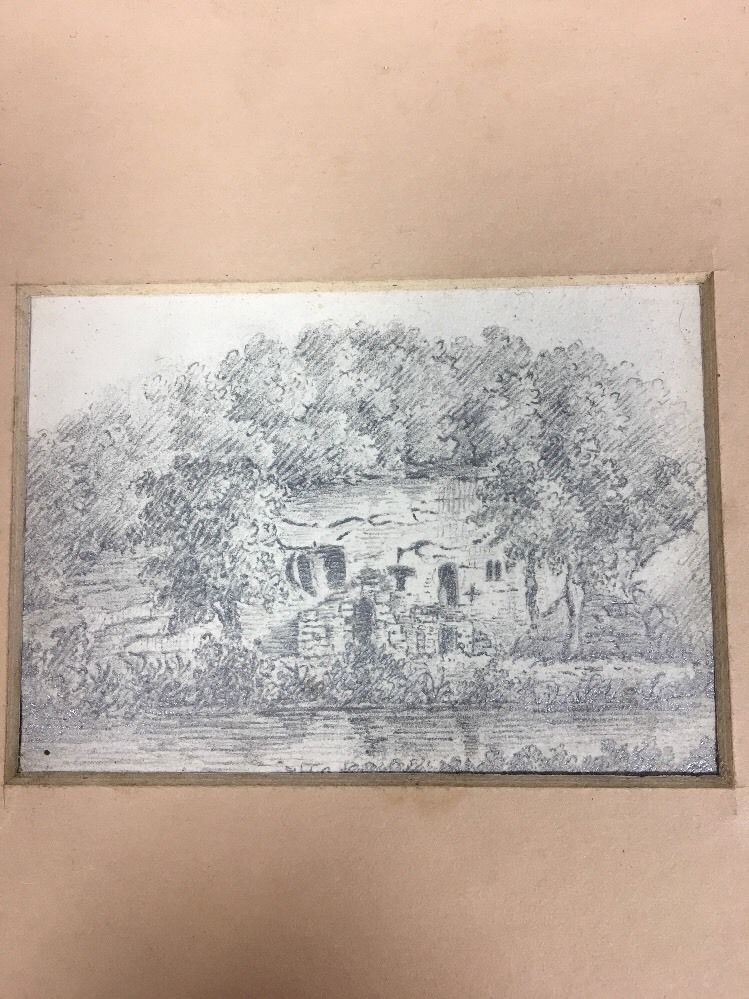

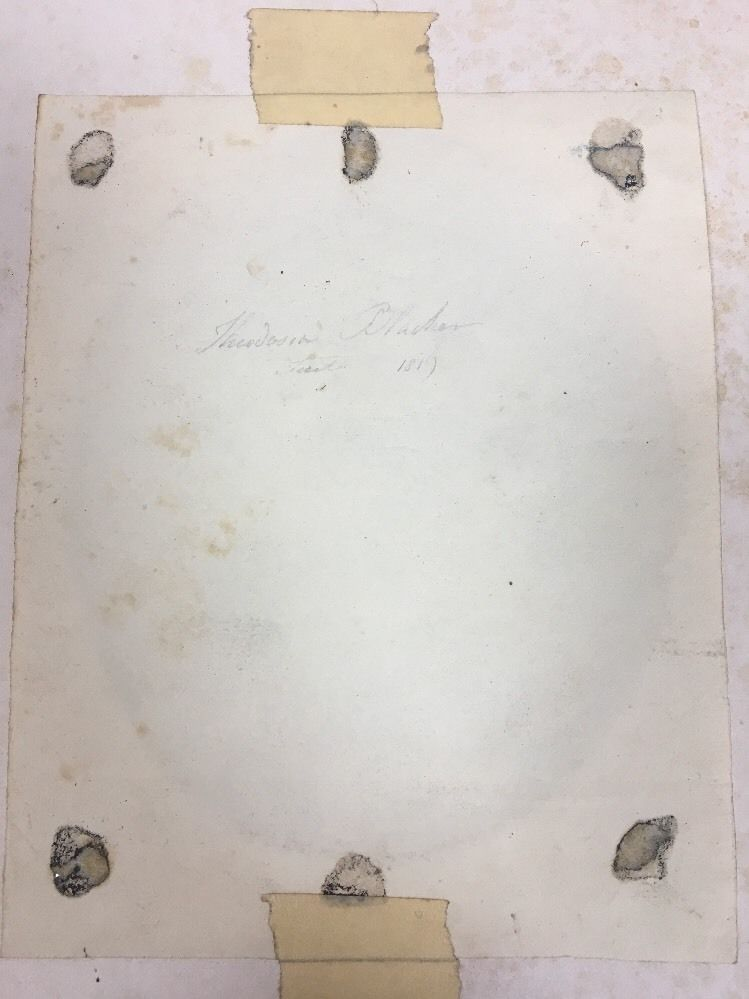
