= Maria Rye =

British social reformer (1829–1903)

Maria Susan Rye (31 March 1829 – 12 November 1903) was a British social reformer and a promoter of emigration from England, especially of young women living in Liverpool workhouses, to the colonies of the British Empire, especially Canada.

== Early life ==
She was born in Golden Square, on 31 March 1829. She was the eldest of the nine children of Edward Rye (1803–1876), a solicitor and bibliophile, and his wife, Maria Rye née Tuppen (1804–1882). Maria Susan's siblings were Elizabeth (b. 1830), Edward (b. 1832), George (b. 1834), Mary Ann (b. 1837), Charles (b. 1840), Walter (b. 1843), Clara Louise (b. 1843), Clara Louisa (b. 1846) and Francis (b. 1848). Edward Rye (1774–1843) of Baconsthorpe, Norfolk, was her grandfather. Of her brothers, Edward Caldwell Rye was an entomologist, and Walter Rye, solicitor, antiquary, and athlete, published works on Norfolk history and topography and was mayor of Norwich in 1908–1909.

Maria Rye received her education at home and read for herself in the large library of her father.

== Career ==
Coming under the influence of Charles Kingsley's father, then vicar of St Luke's Church, she devoted herself at the age of sixteen to parochial work in Chelsea. She was impressed by the lack of opportunity of employment for women outside the teaching profession. In succession to Mary Howitt, she soon became secretary of the Langham Place Group which promoted the Married Women's Property bill, which was brought forward by Sir Thomas Erskine Perry in 1856 but was not fully passed till 1882.

Rye joined the Society for Promoting the Employment of Women on its foundation, but, disapproving of the women's franchise movement which the leading members supported, soon left it. In 1859, she undertook a private law-stationer's business at 12 Portugal Street, Lincoln's Inn, in order to give employment to middle-class girls. At the same time, she helped to establish the Victoria Press in association with her business in 1860 (under the charge of Emily Faithfull), and the employment bureau and telegraph school in Great Coram Street, with Isa Craig as secretary. The telegraph school anticipated the employment of girls as telegraph clerks.

The law-stationer's business prospered, but the applications for employment were far in excess of the demands of the concern. With Jane Lewin, she consequently raised a fund for assisting middle-class girls to emigrate, and to the question of emigration she devoted the rest of her life.

== Emigration ==
In 1861, she founded the Female Middle Class Emigration Society (absorbed since 1884 in the United British Women's Emigration Association). Between 1860 and 1868, she was instrumental in sending girls of the middle class and domestic servants to Australia, New Zealand, and Canada. She visited these colonies to form committees for the protection of the emigrants.

Together with several governesses and over 100 women traveling in steerage, Rye sailed to New Zealand in 1863. There in Dunedin, she found the terrible conditions in which immigrant single women had been housed—former military barracks with few amenities. She became the center of political and philanthropic controversies as she sought reform from the provincial government's immigration offices. Within two years, she had traveled across New Zealand and found few opportunities for skilled, educated single women. Even in the more settled Canterbury region, Rye realized the scheme was not going to work since the local populace emphasized their need for domestic servants or marriageable farmhands.

From 1868, when she handed over her law business to Lewin, Rye devoted herself exclusively to the emigration of pauper children, or, in a phrase which she herself coined, 'gutter children.' After visiting in New York the Little Wanderers' Home for the training of derelict children for emigrant life which Mr. Van Meter, a Baptist minister from Ohio, had founded, she resolved to give the system a trial in London. Encouraged by Anthony Ashley-Cooper, 7th Earl of Shaftesbury and The Times newspaper and with the financial support of William Rathbone VI, M.P., in 1869 she purchased Avenue House, High Street, Peckham, and with her two younger sisters, in spite of public opposition and prejudice, took there from the streets or the workhouses waifs and strays from the ages of three to sixteen. Fifty girls from Kirkdale industrial school, Liverpool, were soon put under her care; they were trained in domestic economy and went through courses of general and religious instruction.

At Niagara, Canada, Rye also acquired a building which she called 'Our Western Home.' It was opened on 1 December 1869. To this house Miss Rye drafted the children from Peckham, and after further training they were distributed in Canada as domestic servants among respectable families. The first party left England in October 1869. She received a civil list pension of £10 in 1871.

In 1874 the London Board of Governors decided to send a representative, Andrew Doyle, to Canada to visit the homes and the children to see how they were faring. Doyle's report praised the women and their staff, saying that they were inspired by the highest motives, but condemned almost everything else about the enterprise. He was critical of the checks made on the children after they were placed with settlers, which in Rye's case were mostly non-existent, and said that:

Because of Miss Rye's carelessness and Miss MacPherson's limited resources, thousands of British children, already in painful circumstances, were cast adrift to be overworked or mistreated by the settlers of early Canada who were generally honest but often hard taskmasters.

Poor law children continued to be received at Peckham from St. George's, Hanover Square, Wolverhampton, Bristol, Reading, and other towns. By 1891, Rye had found homes in Canada for some five hundred children. Lord Shaftesbury remained a consistent supporter, and in 1884 Henry Petty-Fitzmaurice, 5th Marquess of Lansdowne, then governor general of Canada, warmly commended the results of her pioneer system, which Thomas John Barnardo and others subsequently adopted and extended.

== Later life ==
In 1895, owing to the continuous strain, Rye transferred the two institutions in Peckham and Niagara with their funds to the Church of England Waifs and Strays Society (now The Children's Society). In her farewell report of 1895 she stated that 4000 English and Scottish children then in Canada had been sent out from her home in England.

She retired with her sister Elizabeth to 'Baconsthorpe,' Hemel Hempstead, where she spent the remainder of her life. There she died of intestinal cancer on 12 November 1903 after four years of suffering, and was buried in the churchyard.

== See also ==
- Barbara Leigh Smith Bodichon
- Bessie Rayner Parkes
- The Langham Place Group
- Society for Promoting the Employment of Women
