= Helena, comtesse de Noailles =

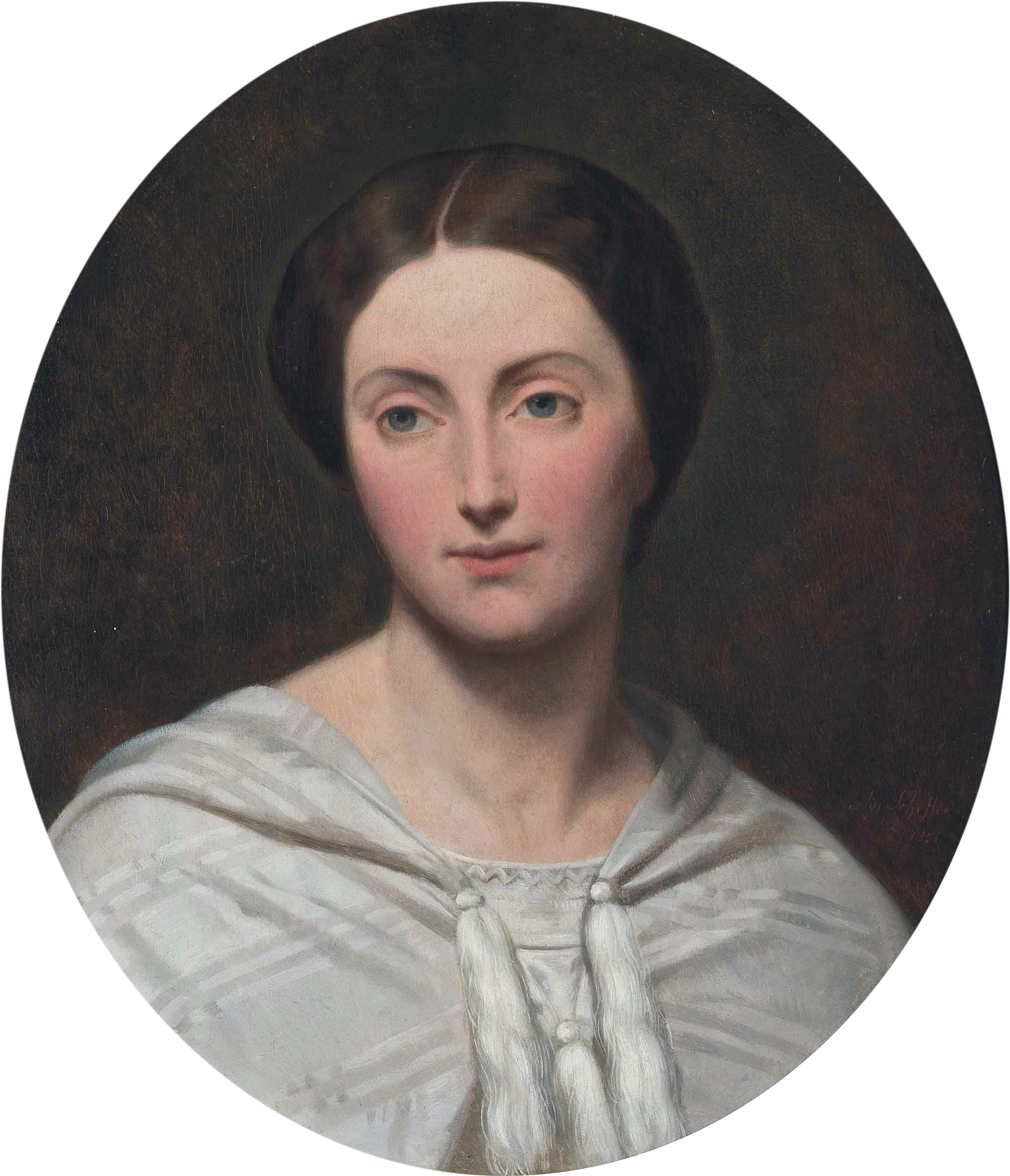
Anna Maria Helena, comtesse de Noailles (Ary Scheffer, 1856)

Anna Maria Helena ("Coesvelt" or Coswell), comtesse de Noailles (c. 1826 – 1908) was an English noblewoman who used her wealth and influence to support the reform of women's rights.

== Family and marriage ==
She was the daughter of William Gordon Coesvelt (grandson of Hendrik Coesvelt, Governor of Sint Eustatius) and Anna Maria Baring, and the granddaughter of Henry Baring, banker and politician, and his wife Maria Matilda Bingham, an American heiress from a well-connected family.

De Noailles married Charles-Antonin, second son of Antoine-Claude-Just de Noailles, duc de Mouchy and prince-duc de Poix in Paris, 25 April 1849. The marriage was short-lived, and their only child died at birth the following year.

She "purchased" a peasant girl, Maria Pasqua Abruzzesi, who sat as an artists' model in Italy and Paris. The countess was drawn to the little girl by her beauty, and subsequently raised her as her daughter.

== Life and legacy ==
Madame de Noailles was a wealthy woman with houses in England, Paris, Montpellier and the French Riviera, which she moved between frequently. She was an important shareholder of the English Woman's Journal, established in 1858 by Barbara Bodichon, Matilda Mary Hays and Bessie Rayner Parkes to cover employment and equality issues. This made her a major supporter of the Langham Place group, which campaigned on several issues from the mid-1850s to the mid-1860s.

She financially supported Elizabeth Blackwell during her struggle to become the first female doctor in the United States.

She left a large legacy of £45 000 towards the founding of an orphanage in Meads on the edge of Eastbourne. However, this legacy was contested under the cy-près doctrine, as the Church Education Corporation Ltd. wished to apply the money towards "the building of a boarding school for girls in or near Oxford". The CEC was a Low Church group that founded several educational establishments for girls, including a teacher training college, Cherwell Hall (now part of St Hilda's College, Oxford) and Milham Ford School, a day school nearby.

== Cultural references ==
A character in Frances Hodgson Burnett's Piccino and Other Child Stories (1894) is partially based on Helena.
