= Langham Place Group =

The Langham Place group was a women's club founded in England in 1858, including Helen Blackburn, a women's rights advocate who later served as editor of The Englishwoman's Review. The group was named after the address, 19 Langham Place, which was for a decade from the late 1850s also the office of the English Woman's Journal.

Its premises included a reading room, a coffee shop, and meeting space for the initiatives which gathered around it, mainly to do with women's rights, access to higher education and wage work (e.g. the Society for Promoting the Employment of Women (S.P.E.W.). Jessie Boucherett and Adelaide Anne Procter through S.P.E.W. offered classes in arithmetic and set up the first commercial school to train women as book-keepers and the first shorthand classes for women. Emily Faithfull trained women as compositors at the Victoria Press on Great Coram Street. Maria Rye set up an office copying legal documents in Lincolns Inn Fields and in 1862, with Barbara Leigh Smith Bodichon, founded the Female Middle-Class Emigration Society.

The space served as a sort of counterpart to the gentlemen's clubs then so important in London. The magazine was largely funded by Helena, comtesse de Noailles, and the hire of the building by Theodosia Blacker, Baroness Monson.
