= Adelaide Anne Procter =

English poet and philanthropist (1825–1864)

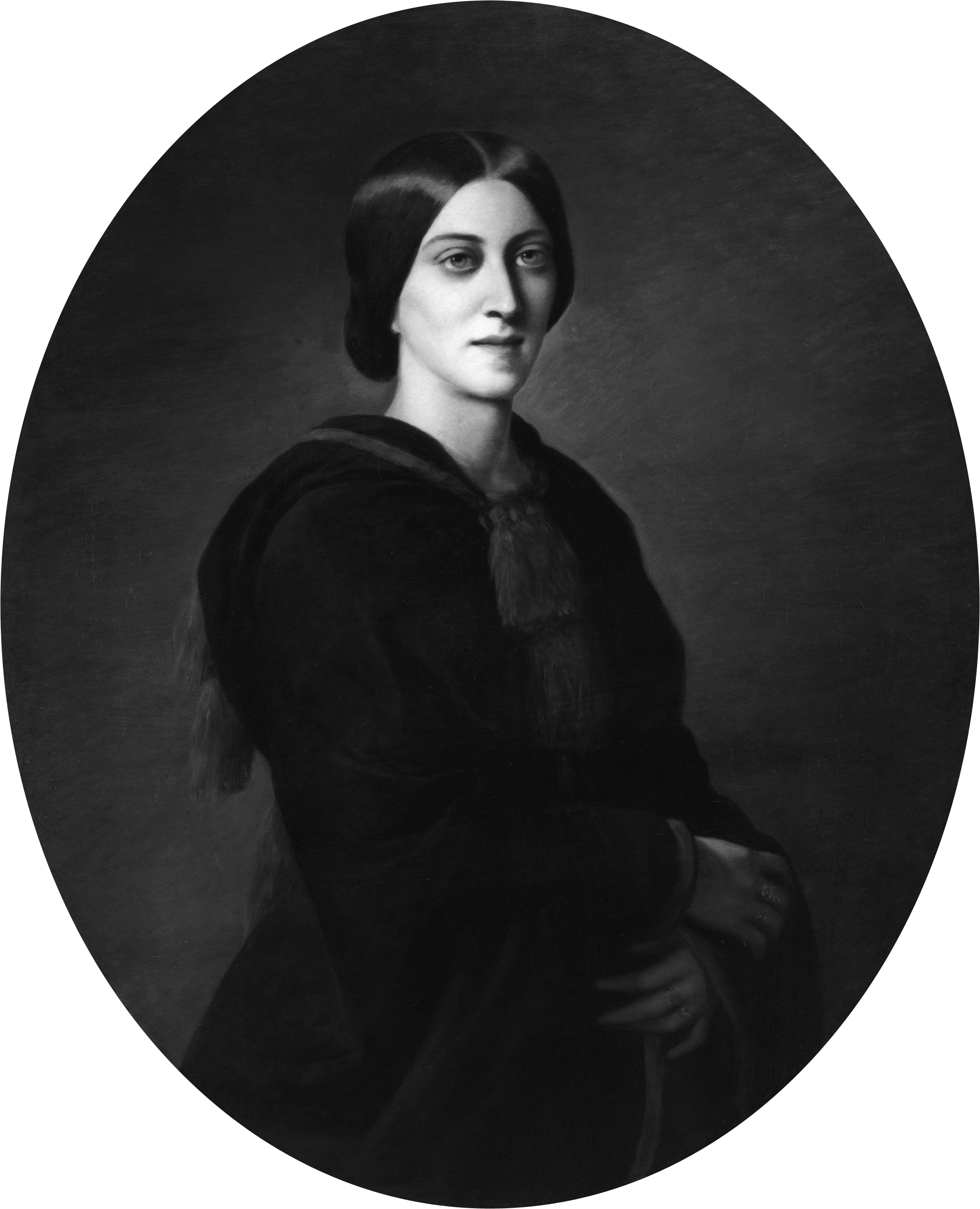
- Born: 30 October 1825; London, England
- Died: 2 February 1864 (aged 38); London, England
- Resting place: Kensal Green Cemetery
- Occupations: Poet, philanthropist

Adelaide Anne Procter (30 October 1825 – 2 February 1864) was an English poet and philanthropist.

Her literary career began when she was a teenager, her poems appearing in Charles Dickens's periodicals Household Words and All the Year Round, and later in feminist journals. Her charity work and her conversion to Roman Catholicism influenced her poetry, which deals with such subjects as homelessness, poverty, and fallen women, among whom she performed philanthropic work. Procter was the favourite poet of Queen Victoria. Coventry Patmore called her the most popular poet of the day, after Alfred, Lord Tennyson. Few 20th-century critics have discussed her work because of Procter's religious beliefs, but her poetry is beginning to be re-evaluated as showing technical skill.

Procter never married. Her health suffered, possibly due to overwork, and she died of tuberculosis at the age of 38.

== Life ==
Adelaide Anne Procter was born at 25 Bedford Square in the Bloomsbury district of London, on 30 October 1825 to the poet Bryan Waller Procter and his wife Anne (née Skepper). The family had strong literary ties: novelist Elizabeth Gaskell enjoyed her visits to the Procter household, and Procter's father was friends with poet Leigh Hunt, essayist Charles Lamb, and novelist Charles Dickens, as well as being acquainted with poet William Wordsworth and critic William Hazlitt. Family friend Bessie Rayner Belloc wrote in 1895 that "everybody of any literary pretension whatever seemed to flow in and out of the house. The Kembles, the Macreadys, the Rossettis, the Dickens [sic], the Thackerays, never seemed to be exactly visitors, but to belong to the place." Author and actress Fanny Kemble wrote that young Procter "looks like a poet's child, and a poet ... [with] a preter-naturally [sic] thoughtful, mournful expression for such a little child".

Dickens spoke highly of Procter's quick intelligence. By his account, the young Procter mastered without difficulty the subjects to which she turned her attention:

When she was quite a young child, she learnt with facility several of the problems of Euclid. As she grew older, she acquired the French, Italian, and German languages ... piano-forte ... [and] drawing. But, as soon as she had completely vanquished the difficulties of any one branch of study, it was her way to lose interest in it, and pass to another.

A voracious reader, Procter was largely self-taught, though she studied at Queen's College in Harley Street in 1850. The college had been founded in 1848 by Frederick Maurice, a Christian Socialist; the faculty included novelist Charles Kingsley, composer John Hullah, and writer Henry Morley.

The 1861 edition of the Victoria Regia, edited by Procter

Procter showed a love of poetry from an early age, carrying with her while still a young child a "tiny album ... into which her favourite passages were copied for her by her mother's hand before she herself could write ... as another little girl might have carried a doll". Procter published her first poem while still a teenager; the poem, "Ministering Angels", appeared in Heath's Book of Beauty in 1843. In 1853 she submitted work to Dickens's Household Words under the name "Mary Berwick", wishing that her work be judged on its own merits rather than in relation to Dickens's friendship with her father; Dickens did not learn "Berwick's" identity till the following year. The poem's publication began Procter's long association with Dickens's periodicals; in all, Procter published 73 poems in Household Words and 7 poems in All the Year Round, most of which were collected into her first two volumes of poetry, both entitled Legends and Lyrics. She was also published in Good Words and Cornhill. As well as writing poetry, Procter was the editor of the journal Victoria Regia, which became the showpiece of the Victoria Press, "an explicitly feminist publishing venture".

In 1851, Procter converted to Roman Catholicism. Following her conversion, Procter became extremely active in several charitable and feminist causes. She became a member of the Langham Place Group, which set out to improve conditions for women, and was friends with feminists Bessie Rayner Parkes (later Bessie Rayner Belloc) and Barbara Leigh Smith, later Barbara Bodichon. Procter helped found the English Woman's Journal in 1858 and, in 1859, the Society for Promoting the Employment of Women, both of which focused on expanding women's economic and employment opportunities. Though on paper Procter was merely one member among many, fellow-member Jessie Boucherett considered her to be the "animating spirit" of the Society. Her third volume of poetry, A Chaplet of Verses (1861), was published for the benefit of a Catholic Night Refuge for Women and Children that had been founded in 1860 at Providence Row in East London.

Procter became engaged in 1858, according to a letter that her friend William Makepeace Thackeray wrote to his daughters that year. The identity of Procter's fiancé remains unknown, and the proposed marriage never took place. According to her German biographer Ferdinand Janku, the engagement seems to have lasted several years before being broken off by Procter's fiancé. Critic Gill Gregory suggests that Procter may have been a lesbian and in love with Matilda Hays, a fellow member of the Society for Promoting the Employment of Women; other critics have called Procter's relationship with Hays "emotionally intense." Procter's first volume of poetry, Legends and Lyrics (1858) was dedicated to Hays and that same year Procter wrote a poem titled "To M.M.H." in which Procter "expresses love for Hays ... [Hays was a] novelist and translator of George Sand and a controversial figure ... [who] dressed in men's clothes and had lived with the sculptor Harriet Hosmer in Rome earlier in the 1850s." While several men showed interest in her, Procter never married.

Procter fell ill in 1862; Dickens and others have suggested that her illness was due to her extensive charity work, which "appears to have unduly taxed her strength". An attempt to improve her health by taking a cure at Malvern failed. On 3 February 1864, Procter died of tuberculosis, having been bed-ridden for almost a year. Her death was described in the press as a "national calamity". Procter was buried in Kensal Green Cemetery.

== Literary career ==
Procter's poetry was strongly influenced by her religious beliefs and charity work; homelessness, poverty, and fallen women are frequent themes. Procter's preface to A Chaplet of Verses and many of her poems stress the misery of the conditions under which the poor lived.

Procter's Catholicism also influenced her choice of images and symbols; Procter often uses references to the Virgin Mary, for example, to "introduce secular and Protestant readers to the possibility that a heavenly order critiques Victorian gender ideology's power structure."

Procter wrote several poems about war (the majority of poems published on this topic in Household Words were by Procter), although she rarely deals directly with the topic, preferring to leave war "in the background, something to be inferred rather than stated." Generally, these poems portray conflict as something "that might unite a nation that had been divided by class distinctions."

According to critic Gill Gregory, Procter "does not overtly ponder the vexed question of the poet, particularly the woman poet and her accession to fame", unlike many other women poets of the time, such as Felicia Hemans and Letitia Elizabeth Landon. Nor is Procter particularly interested in questions of gender roles. Procter is instead primarily concerned with the working classes, particularly working-class women, and with "emotions of women antagonists which have not fully found expression". Procter's work often embodies a Victorian aesthetic of sentimentality, but, according to Francis O'Gorman, does so with "peculiar strength"; Procter employs emotional affect without simplification, holding "emotional energy [in tension] ... against complications and nuances." Procter's language is simple; she expressed to a friend a "morbid terror of being misunderstood and misinterpreted", and her poetry is marked by "simplicity, directness, and clarity of expression".

While critics have long dismissed Procter because her poetry is "straightforward" and religious (and thus deemed full of "sentimental excesses"), her work shows technical skill in its playing with ambiguities of stress and "temporal dislocation." Critics have also for the most part ignored most of Procter's poems, "preferring to discuss the few poems of social critique ... over, for example, the many paeans to Mary." Karen Dieleman, however, argues that taking into account both Procter's religious beliefs and contemporary Roman Catholic liturgical practices shows that Procter's poetry is "attuned to the power of both affect and reserve, spontaneity and control, lay devotion and moral authority."

=== Reputation ===
The Lost Chord
1913 recording of "The Lost Chord" (1877) by Arthur Sullivan and Adelaide Anne Procter, sung by Reed Miller

Procter was "fabulously popular" in the mid-19th century; she was Queen Victoria's favourite poet and Coventry Patmore stated that the demand for her work was greater than that for any other poet, excepting Alfred, Lord Tennyson. One volume alone of her poetry went through as many as nineteen editions between 1858 and 1881. Readers valued Procter's poems for their plainness of expression, although they were considered "not so very original in thought; [their merit is that] they are indeed the utterances 'of a believing heart', pouring out its fulness." Procter herself expressed little ambition about her work: her friend Bessie Raynor Belloc thought that Procter was pained that her reputation as a poet had outstripped her father's, and quoted Procter as saying that "Papa is a poet. I only write verses."

Procter's popularity continued after her death; the first volume of Legends and Lyrics went through 19 editions by 1881, and the second through 14 editions by the same year. Many of her poems were made into hymns or otherwise set to music. Among these was "The Lost Chord", which Arthur Sullivan set to music in 1877; this song was the most commercially successful of the 1870s and 1880s in both Britain and the United States. Composer Hermine Küchenmeister-Rudersdorf set Procter's text to music in her song "Shadow". Her work was also published in the United States and translated into German. By 1938, Procter's reputation had fallen so far that a textbook could mention her poems only to pronounce them "stupid, trivial and not worthy of the subject". Critics such as Cheri Larsen Hoeckley, Kathleen Hickok, and Natalie Joy Woodall argue that the demise of Procter's reputation is due at least in part to the way Charles Dickens characterized her as a "model middle-class domestic angel" and a "fragile and modest saint" rather than as an "active feminist and strong poet." Emma Mason argues that although Dickens's portrayal of Procter "extinguished modern interest" in her, it also "has helped rescue Procter from the kind of endless conjecture about her private life that has confused studies of women like Letitia Landon."

Modern critics have given Procter's work little attention. The few critics who have examined Procter's poetry generally find it important for the way that she overtly expresses conventional sentiments while covertly undermining them. According to Isobel Armstrong, Procter's poetry, like that of many 19th-century women poets, employs conventional ideas and modes of expression without necessarily espousing them in entirety. Francis O'Gorman cites "A Legend of Provence" as an example of a poem with this kind of "double relationship with the structures of gender politics it seems to affirm." Other critics since Armstrong agree that Procter's poetry, while ladylike on the surface, shows signs of repressed emotions and desires. Kirstie Blair states that the suppression of emotion in Procter's work makes the narrative poems all the more powerful, and Gill Gregory argues that Procter's poetry often explores female sexuality in an unconventional way, while as often voicing anxiety about sexual desires. Elizabeth Gray criticizes the fact that the few discussions of Procter's poetry that do exist focus primarily on gender, arguing that the "range and formal inventiveness of this illuminatingly representative Victorian poet have remained largely unexplored."

== List of works ==
Additional information needed

- "Three Evenings in the House", a short story written for A House to Let (1858), one of the collaborative Christmas numbers of the journal Household Words that Charles Dickens published.
- Legends and Lyrics, first series, 1858
- Legends and Lyrics, second series, 1861
- A Chaplet of Verses, 1862
