= Matilda Hays =

English writer, journalist and part-time actress

Matilda Mary Hays
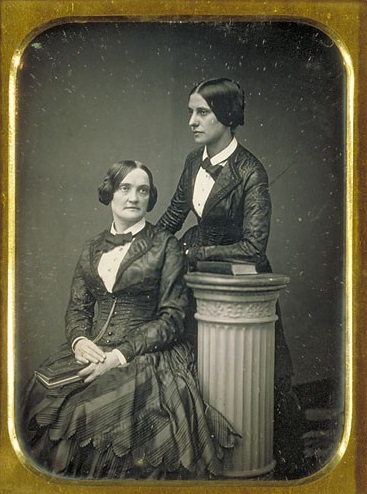
- Matilda Hays (standing) with Charlotte Cushman, 1858
- Born: 8 September 1820; London, England
- Died: 3 July 1897 (aged 76); Liverpool, England
- Occupations: Author, journalist, actor, and translator
- Parents: John Hays; Elizabeth Mary Atkinson

Matilda Mary Hays (8 September 1820 – 3 July 1897) was an English writer, journalist and part-time actress. With Eliza Ashurst, Hays translated several of George Sand's works into English. She co-founded the English Woman's Journal. Her love interests included the actress Charlotte Cushman, with whom she had a 10-year relationship, and the poet Adelaide Anne Procter.

== Early life ==
Hays was born in London on 8 September 1820, the daughter of a corn merchant named John Hays (Note: A John Hays, an "eminent corn-dealer", wrote Observations of Existing Corn Laws in 1824 (published by Richardson in London). John Hays was a partner of William C. Hall. They did business as Hays and Hall, Corn and Flour Factor, Merchant and Mealman and had locations in Brixton, Mark-lane in London and Bermondsey in Surrey.) and his wife, Elizabeth Mary Atkinson. Elizabeth had previously been married to Jacob Breese until his death in February 1807, giving Matilda two elder half-sisters, Emma Marianne and Clara, who married Frederick Salmon in 1830. Matilda's full siblings were Elizabeth, Susanna and Albert.

Hays was identified as a Creole or, according to Joseph Parkes, half Creole. If this is true, it must be through her mother's side, as her father's family were Londoners going back at least three generations.

== Career ==
She wrote articles for periodicals, often regarding women's issues, starting about 1838. The periodicals included The Mirror and Ainsworth's Magazine.

Hays, influenced by George Sand, was a journalist and novelist who was "determined to use her writing to improve the condition of women." In her novel Helen Stanley, Hays wrote that until "Women teach their daughters to respect themselves,... to work for their daily bread, rather than prostitute their persons and hearts" in marriages, women would not have secure financial and social futures.

=== George Sand translations ===
As George Sand's free love and independent lifestyle were unusual for a 19th-century woman, Hays and her friend Eliza Ashurst were "broad-minded" and intrigued by the political and social messages addressed in Sand's books. Hays had received support and encouragement from William Charles Macready and George Henry Lewes to translate Sand's novels into English. Both men wrote to Sand encouraging the arrangement and a friend of Hays, chaplain Edmund Larken, provided funding for the enterprise.

The initial translations of Sand's works were undertaken by Hays, Ashurst and, Larken. La Dernière Aldini, the first volume, was translated by Hays. Ashurst translated Les Maîtres mosaïstes and it was published in 1844. Hays's friend, Giuseppe Mazzini, wrote a preface for Ashurt's translation of Lettres d'un voyageur. Sand, at Mazzini's urging, invited Ashurt to her home in Nohant. Olive Class reported that "Sand was unsettled by the superficial display of feminist rebellion exhibited by her as yet still unmarried disciple and characterized her as 'a prude without modesty.'"

George Henry Lewes suggested to Hays that the translation to the English language also toned down some of the rhetoric with an English cultural sensibility. Mazzini, aware of Lewes's suggestion to Hays, wrote to Sand, referring to Hays: "My friends and I consider it unthinkable that you would be willing to give such license to someone whose ideas are unknown to you."

Four volumes of Sand's work were translated by Hays and Ashurst and published, but they floundered. In attempting to tone down Sand's ideas, the translated books were "stripped it of its power", according to mazzini. The translations were "a smuggler's attempt to conceal the real nature of his infamous cargo", reported the Quarterly Review.

Both Hays and Ashurst also had poor financial rewards, due to the arrangement that they had made with a "bad business publisher." Ashurst and Hays worked to find publishers for their translated and edited versions of Sands' work.

Larken's work with Hays and Ashurst came to an end in 1847.

Hays' translation of Fadette was published in 1851, separate from Ashurst.

=== Woman's journal ===
==== Early attempt ====
In 1847, Hays pursued creation of a Woman's journal, patterned after the American Godey's Lady's Book, to offer a vehicle for women writers and to provide a platform for discourse about women's rights, including better educational and occupational opportunities. Her goal was to afford "free discussion of a subject for which at that time it was impossible to obtain a hearing through ordinary channels of the Press". Charlotte Cushman and her friend, Mary Howitt, helped her explore opportunities to have the journal founded, but realized it was not quite the time to launch the journal and decided to focus her energy on advocacy for the present.

==== Eliza Cook's Journal ====
Shortly after Hays' unsuccessful attempt, poet Eliza Cook started a self-named journal and Hays was a journalistic contributor to the magazine. The journal was "a compendium of essays, poetry, reviews, and fiction that particularly addressed issues such as women's education, dress reform, temperance, and the plight of the working class and domestic servants.

==== English Woman's Journal ====
Hays was one of the co-founders and editor of the English Woman's Journal in 1858. It was in 1858 founded by Barbara Bodichon and Bessie Rayner Parkes, with others, Bodichon being the major shareholder.

The Society for Promoting the Employment of Women and the Victoria Press, which Hays helped found, met at the Langham Place offices of the journal. These premises had been obtained by her close friend Theodosia, Lady Monson for her. Monson also arranged for the offices and the reading room to be furnished and it became a de facto women's club offering meals, drinks, periodicals and newspapers. Monson became a director in 1860 and she helped with the administration. Monson paid for the building to be re-furnished in 1863. Hays had left the journal by 1864, reputedly because of her "difficult temperament". She had often disagreed with Parkes, her co-editor, about the journal's direction.

=== Acting ===
In 1848, there was a convergence of financial need, the "small fortune" Hays received was lost due to her father's depleted financial situation, (Note: John Hays was in his 80s by this time and increasingly relied upon his daughter's financial assistance. He was 97 when he died in 1862.) and Charlotte Cushman's sister, Susan, was leaving the stage, which created an acting opportunities. Charlotte's sister, Susan Webb Cushman, who had played Juliet to Charlotte's Romeo, left the stage to marry a successful Liverpool scientist, James Sheridan Muspratt.

The women practiced together at the Yorkshire estate of the Duke of Devonshire for 6 October 1848 opening in Bath. Hays acted with Cushman for just a few months, as Cushman increasingly became a star.

== Published works ==
=== George Sand translations ===
Ashurst translated the following books:

- Sand, George. (1842). Spiridion. Transl. Eliza A. Ashurst. Ed. by Matilda M. Hays. London: Churton.
- Sand, George. (1847). Letters of a Traveller. Transl. by Eliza A. Ashurst. Ed. by Matilda M. Hays. [Introduction by J. Mazzini]. London: Churton, 1847.
- Sand, George. (1847). The Works of George Sand. By Matilda M. Hays. [Translated by Matilda M. Hays, Eliza A. Ashurst, and E. R. Larken.].
- Sand, George. (1847). Andre'. Transl. Eliza A. Ashurst, Ed. by Matilda M. Hays. London: Churton.
- Sand, George. (1851). Fadette. Transl. Matilda Hays.

=== Novels ===
- Matilda M. Hays (1846). Helen Stanley. London: E. Churton.
- Matilda M. Hays (1866). Adrienne Hope. London: T. Cautley Newby.

== Personal life ==
She had close personal relationships with Charlotte Cushman, Adelaide Anne Procter and Harriet Hosmer.

=== Charlotte Cushman ===
Hays and Charlotte Cushman met between 1846 (Note: They had mutual friends William Charles Macready, Mary Howitt, Geraldine Jewsbury, and Eliza Meteyard.) and 1848. Soon after, they began a lesbian affair, a relationship they maintained for nearly 10 years, and in Europe were publicly known as a couple. Elizabeth Barrett Browning commented, "I understand that she (Cushman) and Miss Hays have made vows of celibacy and of eternal attachment to each other -- they live together, dress alike,... it is a female marriage." They wore tailored shirts and jackets. Matilda was often referred to by their friends as Mathew or Max.

In 1852, Cushman retired from the stage and joined Hays in Rome, Italy, where the lived in an American expatriate community, made up mostly of lesbian artists and sculptors. In 1854, Hays left Cushman for Harriet Hosmer, which launched a series of jealous interactions among the three women. Hays eventually returned to live with Cushman, but the tensions between her and Cushman would never be repaired. By late 1857, Cushman was secretly involved with Emma Stebbins. One night while Cushman was writing a note, Hays walked in, suspected that the note was to Stebbins, and demanded to see it. Cushman refused and Hays became mad and chased her round the house, hitting her with her fists. The relationship ended and Hays sued Cushman, claiming that she sacrificed her career to support Cushman's career. Cushman made a payment to Hays and their relationship ended.

=== Adelaide Anne Procter ===
Hays was believed to have had a love interest in Adelaide Anne Proctor, who dedicated Legends and Lyrics to her with:

Our tokens of love are for the most part barbarous, Cold and lifeless, because they do not represent our life. The only gift is a portion of thyself. Therefore let the farmer give his corn; the miner, a gem; a sailor, coral and shells; the painter, his picture; and the poet, his poem.

— Emerson

She also wrote a love poem for Hays entitled, A Retrospect. Hays oversaw the tending of Procter's grave after her death and mourned her death throughout her later years.

=== Theodosia Blacker, Lady Monson ===
Theodosia Blacker, Lady Monson (1803–1891) was a promoter of women's rights who rented 19 Langham Place as a homeplace for the Langham Place group, a circle of like-minded women who gathered there. She was the last companion of Hays.

=== Later years and death ===
Hays died in Liverpool at 15 Sefton Drive in Toxteth Park, on 3 July 1897. Although Adelaide Procter had died 30 years before Hays, the Liverpool Echo obituary stated that she had been "the dear friend of Adelaide Procter, gone before."
