= Female Middle Class Emigration Society =

UK organisation assisting women to emigrate

- Abbreviation: FMCES
- Merged into: British Women's Emigration Association
- Formation: May 1862
- Founders: Emily Faithfull; Jane E. Lewin; Maria Rye
- Dissolved: 1884
- Purpose: Assisting unemployed educated middle-class women to emigrate to British colonies
- Headquarters: 12 Portugal Street, London
- Patron: Earl of Shaftesbury

The Female Middle Class Emigration Society (FMCES, 1862–1884) was organisation to assist unemployed but educated middle class women from the United Kingdom of Great Britain and Ireland to emigrate to colonies of the British Empire.

== History ==
The Female Middle Class Emigration Society (FMCES) was founded in May 1862 by Emily Faithfull, Jane E. Lewin and Maria Rye, with the Earl of Shaftesbury as patron. The Society aimed to assist unemployed but educated middle class women from the United Kingdom of Great Britain and Ireland to emigrate to colonies of the British Empire. The women were expected to find suitable employment, usually as governesses or clerks, when they arrived in Australia, New Zealand, South Africa or Canada.

The Society was financed by public subscription and private donation, following an appeal published in The Times newspaper. Barbara Bodichon additionally supported the fundraising for the organisation, with the Society offices based at 12 Portugal Street, London, which was also the base of Bodichon's periodical, English Woman’s Journal.

Applicants to the Society were offered interest-free loans to be repaid over a period of 28 months, as middle class women were outside of the scope of most governmental emigration schemes. Four references were required with applications.

In 1862, Rye and the Society sent the first group of educated women to Melbourne, Sydney and Natal. Rye also visited Australia, New Zealand, and Canada to form committees for the protection of the female emigrants. In 1868, Lewin took charge of the Society as Rye began to devote herself exclusively to the emigration of pauper children, such as girls who were inmates of the workhouse.

In 1884, the Society was absorbed into the newly formed British Women's Emigration Association. It had supported approximately 300 women to emigrate before dissolution, with many of the women recording their experiences in lengthy letters that were transcribed into letter-books after receipt in London.
