= Emily Davies =

English feminist and suffragist (1830–1921)

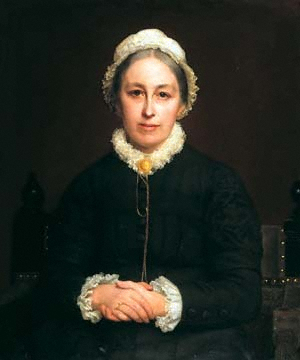
- Emily Davies portrait by Rudolph Lehmann, 1880
- Born: Sarah Emily Davies; 22 April 1830; Carlton Crescent, Southampton, England
- Died: 13 July 1921 (aged 91); Belsize Park, London, England
- Known for: Editor of English Woman's Journal; Founder of Girton College, Cambridge
- Movement: Feminist; Suffragist

Sarah Emily Davies (22 April 1830 – 13 July 1921) was an English feminist who founded Girton College, Cambridge. She campaigned as a suffragist and for women's rights to university education.

In her early life, Davies attended meetings of the National Association for the Promotion of Social Science and befriended Barbara Bodichon and Elizabeth Garrett Anderson. After moving to London with her mother in 1862, she wrote for and edited the English Woman's Journal and joined the Langham Place Group. She co-founded the London Schoolmistresses' Association and the Kensington Society, which pressured for universal suffrage, although she herself believed only unmarried women and widows should gain the vote.

After resigning from Girton in 1904, Davies became secretary of the London branch of the National Society for Women's Suffrage, later leaving to join the Conservative and Unionist Women's Franchise Association. She died in London at the age of 91. Davies's rigid views on education were controversial during her lifetime, though historians have seen her achievements in a more sympathetic light more recently. In 2019, Baroness Hale unveiled a blue plaque jointly commemorating founders Emily Davies and Barbara Bodichon, to mark the 150th anniversary of Girton College.

== Early life ==
Sarah Emily Davies was born on 22 April 1830 at Carlton Crescent, Southampton, England, to a teacher, Mary (née Hopkinson), and an evangelical clergyman, John D. Davies. The family was in Southampton because her father was covering for another priest; his parish was in Chichester. They moved to Normandy in France in 1836, then back to Chichester and then to Gateshead, in County Durham in 1839.

John D. Davies had traditionally patriarchal views on education, so whilst her three brothers attended private schools and two of them studied at the University of Cambridge, Davies and her older sister Jane were not educated and instead lived at home practising needlework and philanthropy. In the 1850s, Davies cared for Jane and a brother, Henry, both of whom had separately contracted tuberculosis. The two both died in 1858, as did another brother, William, who had been wounded fighting in the Crimean War.

== Women's rights ==
Davies was introduced to women's rights in her twenties. Whilst caring for Henry in Algiers, she met Barbara Bodichon and later, staying with her brother Llewelyn in London, she attended lectures by Elizabeth Blackwell, the first female doctor in the UK, with Elizabeth Garrett Anderson. Anderson and Bodichon inspired Davies to become a suffragist and to campaign for better education for women. She also went to meetings of the feminist National Association for the Promotion of Social Science with Llewelyn, who had joined the group, and supported her friend Garrett Anderson in her medical studies. Living in Gateshead again from 1860 until 1862, she set up a local branch of the Society for Promoting the Employment of Women and wrote letters promoting women's rights. After the death of her father in January 1862, Davies moved to London with her mother.

In London, Davies wrote for and edited the English Woman's Journal, also joining the Langham Place Group, a club for women. She helped to set up the Victoria Magazine, later disassociating from it when Emily Faithfull was named in the Codrington divorce case, since she did not want to appear to be endorsing immorality. Her paper "'Medicine as a profession for women" was read on her behalf by Russell Gurney to the National Association for the Promotion of Social Science in June 1862. Working from October as secretary to a committee tasked with enabling women to enter university, Davies found 83 girls to sit local examinations in Cambridge in a trial run. This led to a petition signed by almost 1,000 teachers and the decision in 1865 to permanently allow girls to sit examination in Cambridge. After that success, Davies became one of the first women to address a royal commission as an expert witness. She pressed for admission of women to the universities of London, Oxford and Cambridge. In 1866 she published The Higher Education of Women.

Along with other women's rights advocates such as Dorothea Beale, Barbara Bodichon, Frances Mary Buss and Elizabeth Garrett Anderson, Davies founded a women's discussion group, the Kensington Society in 1865. Later the London Suffrage Committee was formed as an offshoot and petitioned, via John Stuart Mill, Parliament to grant women voting rights. Davies's belief that only unmarried women and widows should gain the vote brought her into conflict with the majority of the women in the group, who wanted universal suffrage, so she stepped aside from campaigning for voting rights and concentrated instead on higher education for women.

== Girton College ==
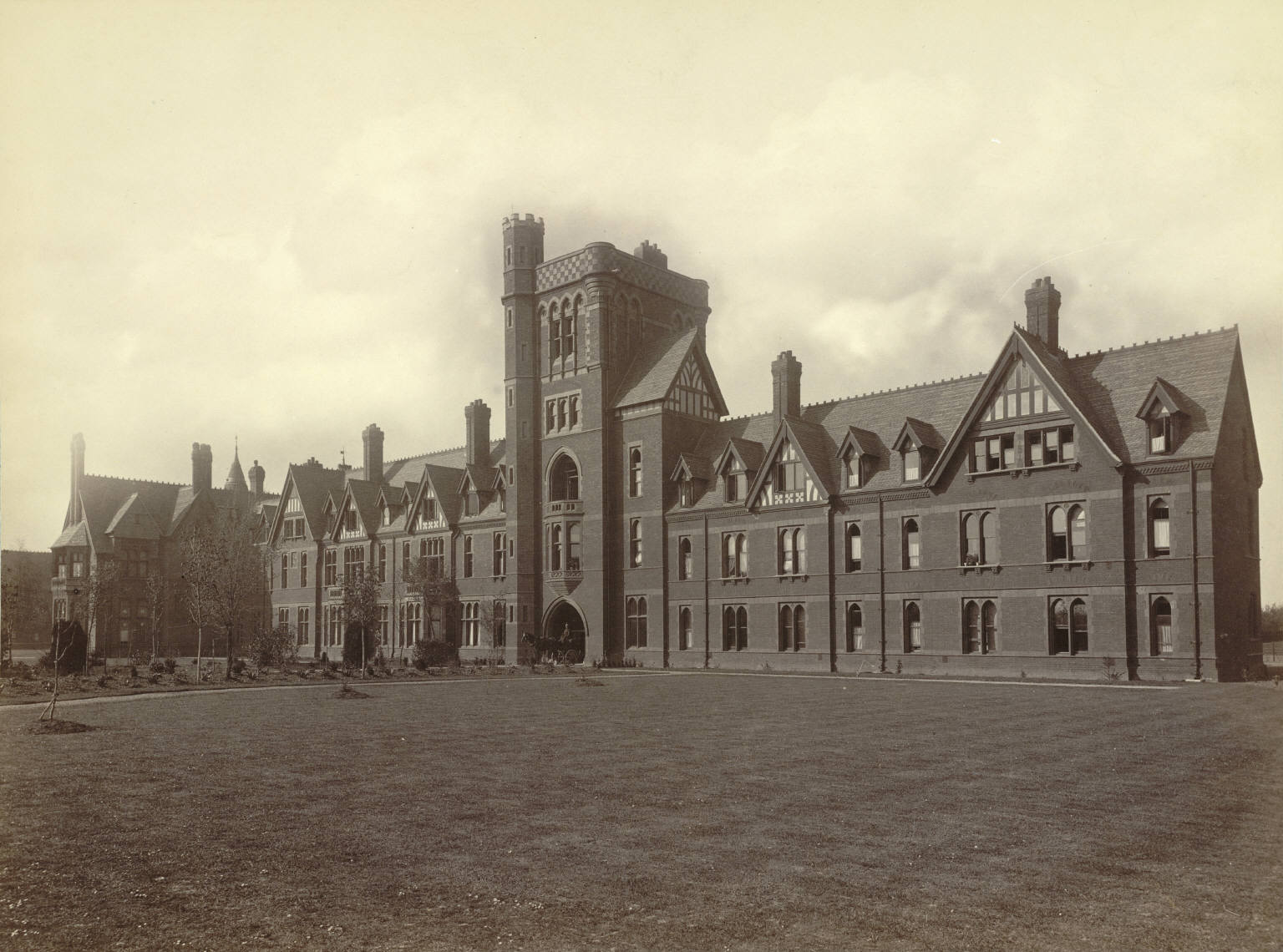
Girton College, Cambridge

Davies founded the London Schoolmistresses' Association in 1866 to discuss female education. At first she thought it best to build up Queen's College, London into a college for women over 18, but this plan failed, so then she set up a committee to fundraise for Britain's first women's university college. With the support of Frances Buss, Dorothea Beale and Barbara Bodichon, she set up a college at Benslow House, a rented villa in Hitchin, Hertfordshire, roughly halfway between Cambridge and London. Initially there were five students. She then moved the project in 1873 to the outskirts of Cambridge, where it became Girton College. Davies was keen to both keep her young female students away from men and to give them the same educational courses as their male contemporaries. She pressed for a curriculum equivalent to the one offered to men at the time. The Senate rejected her proposals to let women officially sit the Tripos examinations, but Davies continued to train students for them on an unofficial basis.

Following the Elementary Education Act 1870, Davies was elected to the London School Board, representing Greenwich. She did not stand again in 1873, preferring to concentrate on Girton College. In 1871, a second women-only college was founded by Anne Clough and Henry Sidgwick; it was called Newnham College. Davies served as Mistress of Girton College from 1873 until 1875, then acted as honorary secretary for three decades. Caroline Croom Robertson joined the management in 1877 in order to reduce the load on Davies. In 1896, Davies published Women in the universities of England and Scotland, criticising the state of higher education in England and lauded Scottish and Welsh universities for putting female and male students on an equal footing. Cambridge University only began to grant full university degrees to women in 1940.

== Later life ==
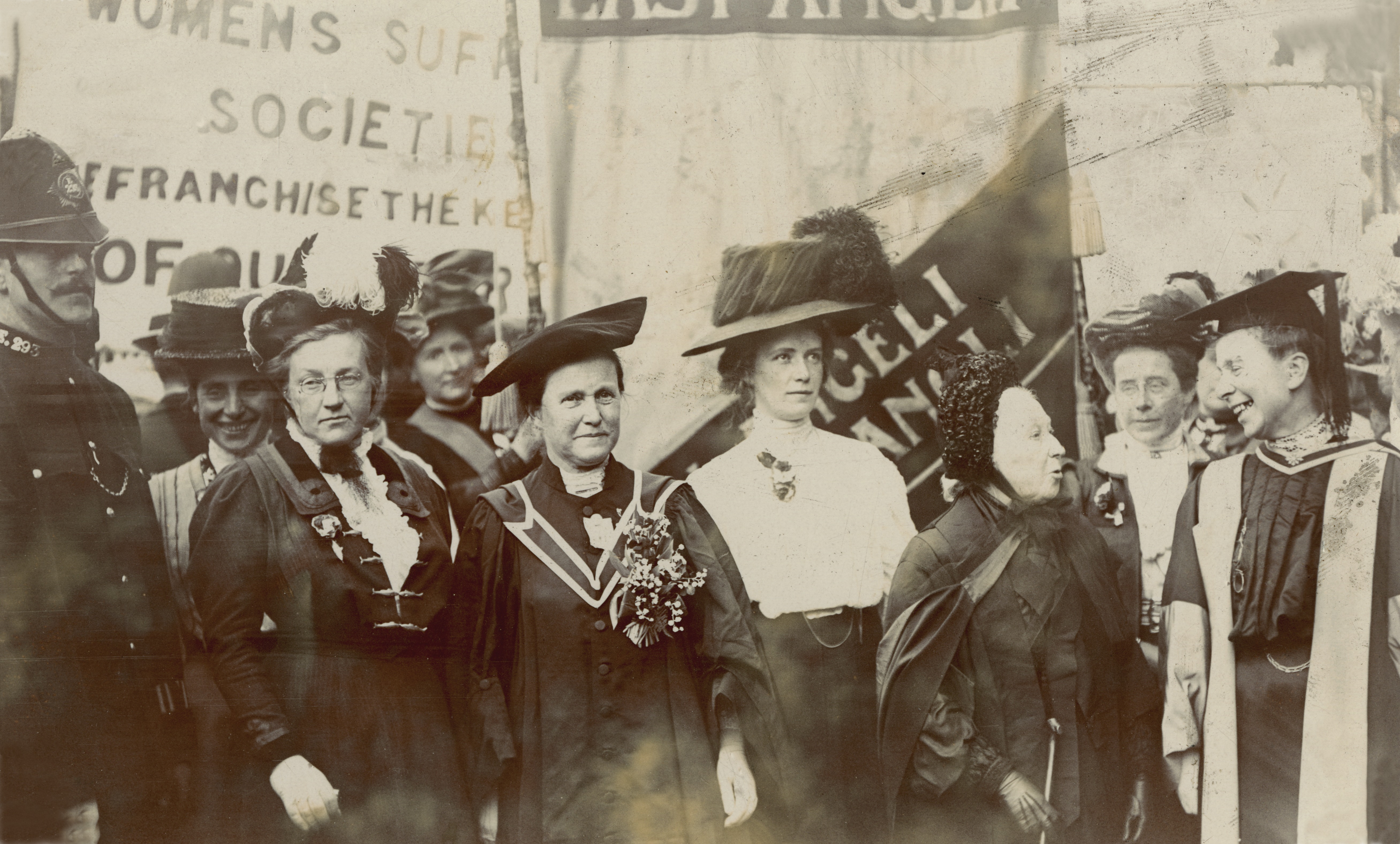
From left to right in foreground: Frances Balfour, Millicent Fawcett, Ethel Snowden, Emily Davies (with black bonnet) and Sophie Bryant

After resigning from Girton in 1904, Davies became secretary of the London branch of the National Society for Women's Suffrage and two years later led members to a discussion with Prime Minister Henry Campbell-Bannerman. She left the London group when the National Union of Women's Suffrage Societies decided to support the Labour Party in 1912 and instead joined the Conservative and Unionist Women's Franchise Association. She was known for opposing the militant tactics used by the Suffragettes. In 1910, Davies published a collection of her writings entitled Thoughts on some questions relating to women, with a foreword by Constance Jones.

Davies moved to Hampstead in London in 1914, living near her brother Llewelyn until he died in 1916. She was one of the few original suffrage activists (and the only remaining member of the Langham Place Group) still alive to be able to vote in an election, after the passing of the Parliament (Qualification of Women) Act 1918. At the age of 91, Davies died at home in Belsize Park, Hampstead, London, on 13 July 1921 and was buried at St Marylebone Cemetery two days later, leaving an estate of £5440 17s 2d (equivalent to £186,000 in 2021).

== Legacy and recognition ==
In June 1901, Davies received an honorary Doctor of Laws (LL.D.) from the University of Glasgow. During her lifetime, she was supported by some feminists and criticised by others for her rigid views on how education for women should be organised. Lady Stephen published Emily Davies and Girton College in 1927. More recently, historians have seen her achievements in a more sympathetic light, although it is still open to question whether she was a conservative reformer or she only allied herself with those in power to further her aims. A biography entitled Emily Davies and the Liberation of Women 1830-1921 was published in 1990.

Owing to the activism of Emily Davies and others, more women began to enter higher education in the UK. On 30 June 2019, Baroness Hale unveiled a blue plaque jointly commemorating founders Davies and Barbara Bodichon, to mark the 150th anniversary of Girton College. The plaque was installed on the main tower of the college.

== Selected works ==
- Davies, Emily (2004). Murphy, Ann B.; Raftery, Deirdre (eds.). Emily Davies: Collected Letters, 1861–1875. University of Virginia. ISBN 978-0-8139-2232-4.
- Davies, Emily (1910). Thoughts on some questions relating to women. OCLC 788783.
- Davies, Emily (1999) [1866]. The Higher Education of Women. Adegi Graphics. ISBN 978-0-543-98292-6.
- Davies, Emily (11 June 1862). "Medicine as a profession for women". Paper Read Out by Russell Gurney at the London Meeting of the National Association for the Promotion of Social Science.
- Davies, Emily (May 1860). "Female physicians". English Woman's Journal.

== See also ==
- History of feminism

== External links and references ==
- Works by or about Emily Davies at the Internet Archive
- Columbia Encyclopedia entry

Academic offices
Preceded by Annie Austin	Mistress of Girton College, Cambridge; 1872–1875	Succeeded by Marianne Bernard
