= Whatlington =

Village in East Sussex, England

Coordinates: 50.94°N 0.51°E

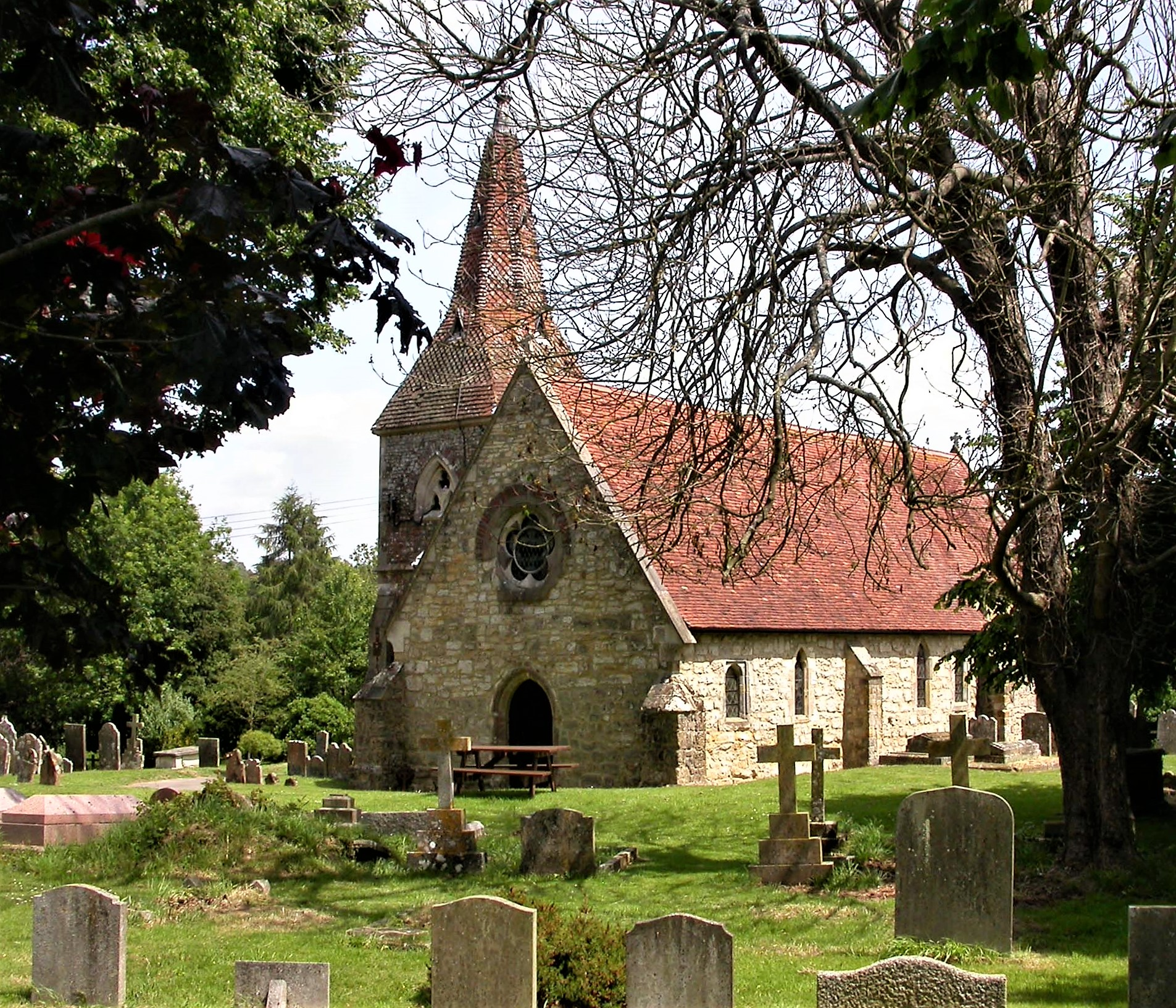
- St Mary Magdalen parish church

- Location within East Sussex
- Area: 6.0 km^{2} (2.3 sq mi)
- Population: 374 (Parish-2011)
  - Density: 172/sq mi (66/km^{2})
- OS grid reference: TQ762185
  - London: 47 miles (76 km) NW
- District: Rother
- Shire county: East Sussex
- Region: South East
- Country: England
- Sovereign state: United Kingdom
- Post town: BATTLE
- Postcode district: TN33
- Dialling code: 01424
- Police: Sussex
- Fire: East Sussex
- Ambulance: South East Coast
- UK Parliament: Bexhill and Battle

Whatlington is a village and civil parish in the Rother district of East Sussex, England. The village is seven miles (11 km) north of Hastings, just off the A21 road.

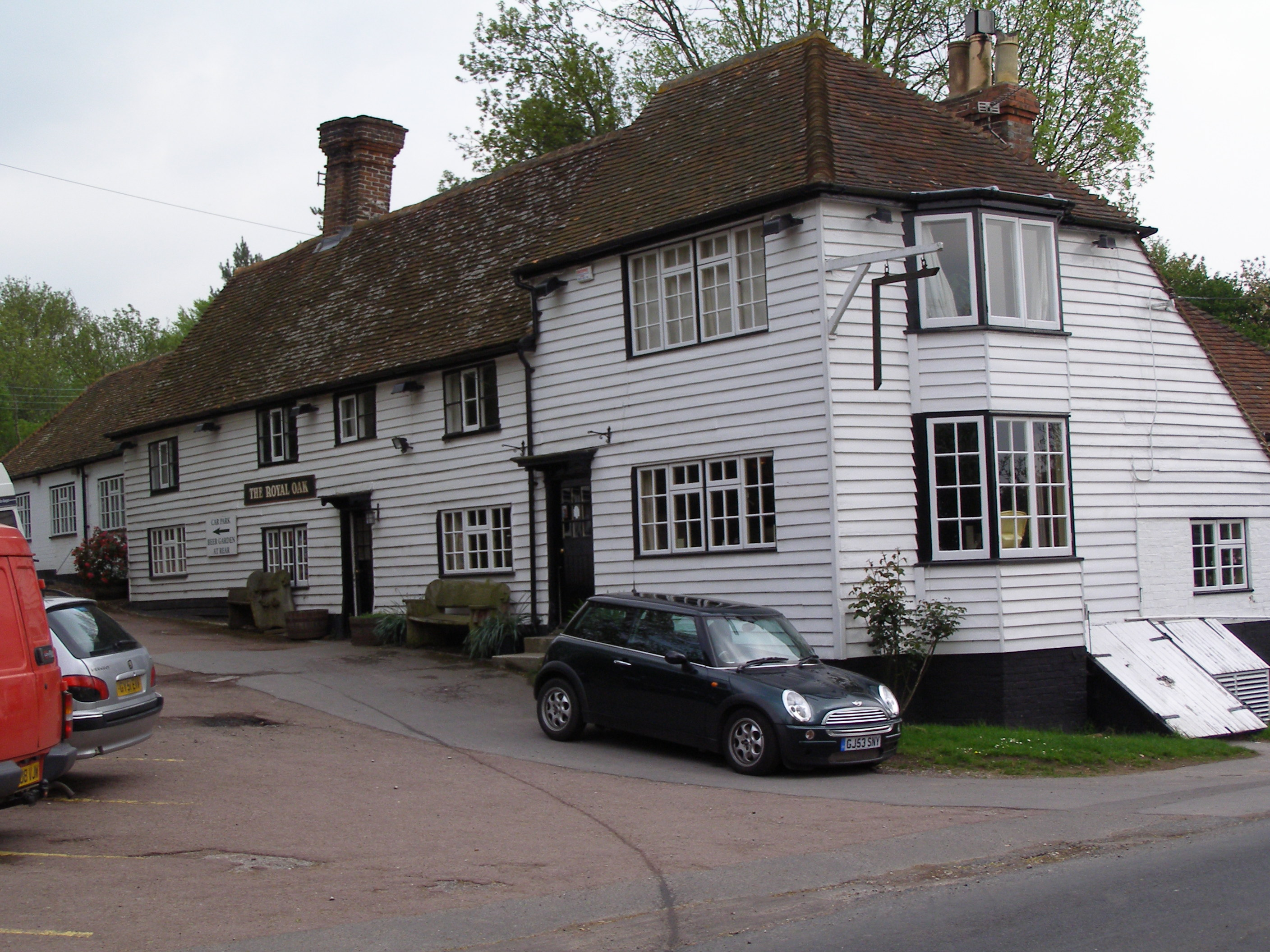
Royal Oak pub

The village is in two parts, one in the valley on the road from Battle, where the church and the parish hall lie on either side of the stream, and one a mile or so further on the main A21 to Hastings, with a triangular village green in front of the Royal Oak pub and restaurant.

The Norman parish church is dedicated to St Mary Magdalene; the yew tree which stood there until 1987 was traditionally thought to be one thousand years old, and to have been used by William the Conqueror to hang members of King Harold's personal guard. Malcolm Muggeridge lived with his family in Whatlington; both he and his wife are buried in the churchyard.

On the main road a now disused chapel serves as a commercial business.

The early feminist Barbara Bodichon was born here in 1827.

== Governance ==
The lowest level of government is the Whatlington parish council. The parish council is responsible for local amenities such as the provision of litter bins, bus shelters and allotments. They also provide a voice into the district council meetings. The parish council comprises five councillors with elections being held every four years.

Rother District council provides the next level of government with services such as refuse collection, planning consent, leisure amenities and council tax collection. Whatlington lies within the Darwell ward, which provides two councillors.

East Sussex county council is the third tier of government, providing education, libraries and highway maintenance. Whatlington falls within the Battle and Crowhurst ward.

The UK Parliament constituency for Whatlington is Bexhill and Battle. Huw Merriman was re-elected in the 2019 election.
