= Emily Faithfull =

English activist and publisher (1835–1895)

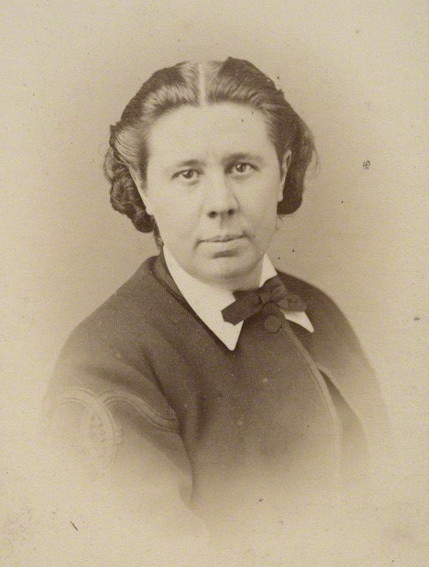
- Born: 27 May 1835; Headley, Surrey, England
- Died: 31 May 1895 (aged 60); Manchester, England
- Occupations: women's rights activist and publisher

Emily Faithfull (27 May 1835 – 31 May 1895) was an English women's rights activist who set up the Victoria Press to publish the English Woman's Journal.

== Biography ==
Emily Faithfull was born on 27 May 1835 at Headley Rectory, Surrey. She was the youngest daughter of the Rev. Ferdinand Faithfull (who ran a small boys' school at the Rectory) and Elizabeth Mary Harrison. Faithfull attended school in Kensington and was presented at court in 1857.

Faithfull joined the Langham Place Circle, composed of like-minded women such as Barbara Leigh Smith Bodichon, Bessie Rayner Parkes, Jessie Boucherett, Emily Davies, and Helen Blackburn. The Langham Place Circle advocated for legal reform in women's status (including suffrage), wider employment possibilities, and improved educational opportunities for girls and women. Although Faithfull identified with all three aspects of the group's aims, her primary areas of interest centered on advancing women's employment opportunities. The Circle was responsible for forming the Society for Promoting the Employment of Women in 1859.

In 1864, Faithfull was implicated in a divorce case between Admiral Henry Codrington and his wife Helen Jane Smith Codrington (1828–1876). Codrington was accused of attempting to rape Faithfull. These charges were dropped and Faithfull declined to provide testimony. It was also suggested that Faithfull and Helen were lesbian lovers. As a result of Faithfull's limited involvement and association with the case, her reputation suffered and she was shunned by the Langham Place Group. It was after this association with the case that Faithfull moved to destroy all of her private papers, in particular letters written to and from her family, leaving little behind besides her professional publications and a few treasured letters and clippings.

Of her nephews, one was the actor Rutland Barrington and another the Indologist John Faithfull Fleet, ICS. Among her friends she counted Richard Peacock, one of the founders of Beyer, Peacock & Company, Manchester locomotive manufacturers, to whom she dedicated the Edinburgh edition of her book Three Visits To America with the words to my "Friend Richard Peacock Esq of Gorton Hall" in 1882. She was a witness to the marriage of Peacock's daughter Jane Peacock to William Taylor Birchenough, the son of John Birchenough, another silk manufacturer cited approvingly in Three Visits To America for his treatment of women employees.

In 1888 Faithfull was awarded a civil list pension of £50. She died in Manchester.

She is a protagonist of Emma Donoghue's 2008 novel, The Sealed Letter, which is based on the Codrington divorce case of 1864.

== Victoria Press and Victoria Magazine ==
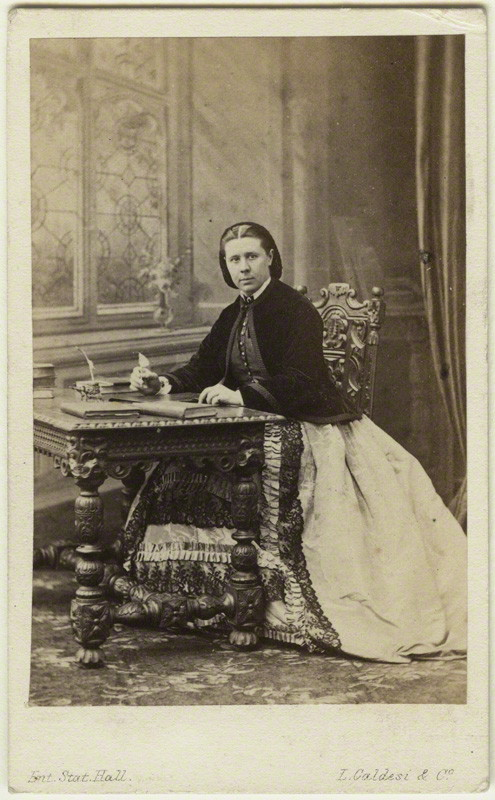
Emily Faithfull, ca. 1860s by Leonida Caldesi (1822–1891), albumen carte-de-visite, 1860s, NPG x46997

With the object of extending women's sphere of labour, which was then very limited, in 1860 Emily Faithfull set up in London a printing establishment for women, called The Victoria Press. From 1860 until 1864, it published the feminist English Woman's Journal. Both Faithfull and her Victoria Press soon obtained a reputation for its excellent work, and Faithfull was shortly afterwards appointed printer and publisher in ordinary to Queen Victoria.

In 1863 she began the publication of a monthly, Victoria Magazine, in which for eighteen years she continuously and earnestly advocated the claims of women to remunerative employment.

== Activism ==
In January 1864 she published the first annual report of the Ladies' London Emancipation Society and she went on to publish other works on behalf of this society. In 1868 she published a novel, Change upon Change. She also appeared as a lecturer, and, with the object of furthering the interests of women, lectured widely and successfully both in England and the United States, which latter she visited in 1872 and 1882.

She was a member of the Society for Promoting the Employment of Women. She considered compositor's work (a comparatively lucrative trade of the time) to be a possible mode of employment for women to pursue. This was opposed by the London Printer's Union, which was open only to men and claimed that women lacked the requisite intelligence and physical skill.

Tricks of a most unmanly nature were resorted to, their frames and stools were covered with ink to destroy their dresses unawares, the letters were mixed up in their boxes, and the cases were emptied of "sorts." The men who were induced to come into the office to work the presses and teach the girls, had to assume false names to avoid detection, as the printers' union forbade their aiding the obnoxious scheme. – Emily Faithfull

== Archives ==
The archives of Emily Faithfull are held at The Women's Library at the London School of Economics, ref 7EFA.
