= National Association for the Promotion of Social Science =

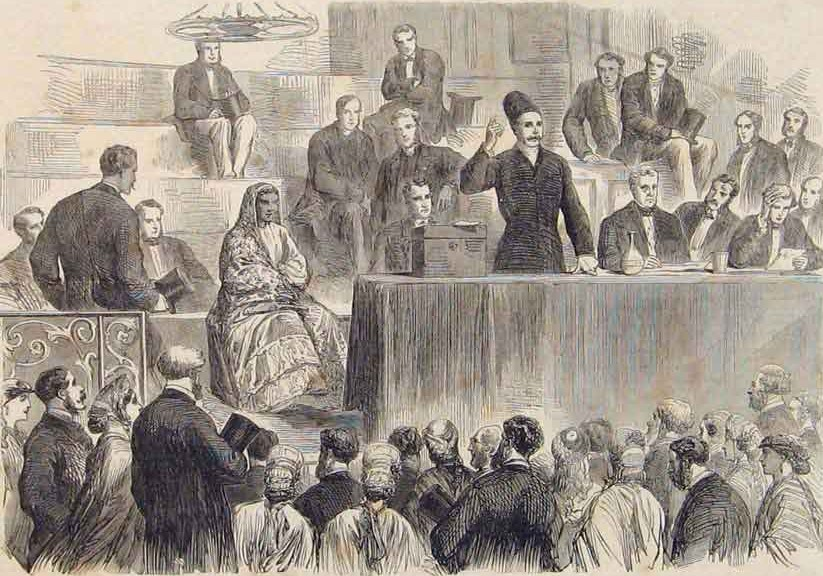
At the 1865 Social Science Congress in Sheffield, the Parsi reformer Manockjee Cursetjee speaks on female education in India

The National Association for the Promotion of Social Science (NAPSS), often known as the Social Science Association, was a British reformist group founded in 1857 by Lord Brougham. It pursued issues in public health, industrial relations, penal reform, and female education. It was dissolved in 1886.

== Background ==
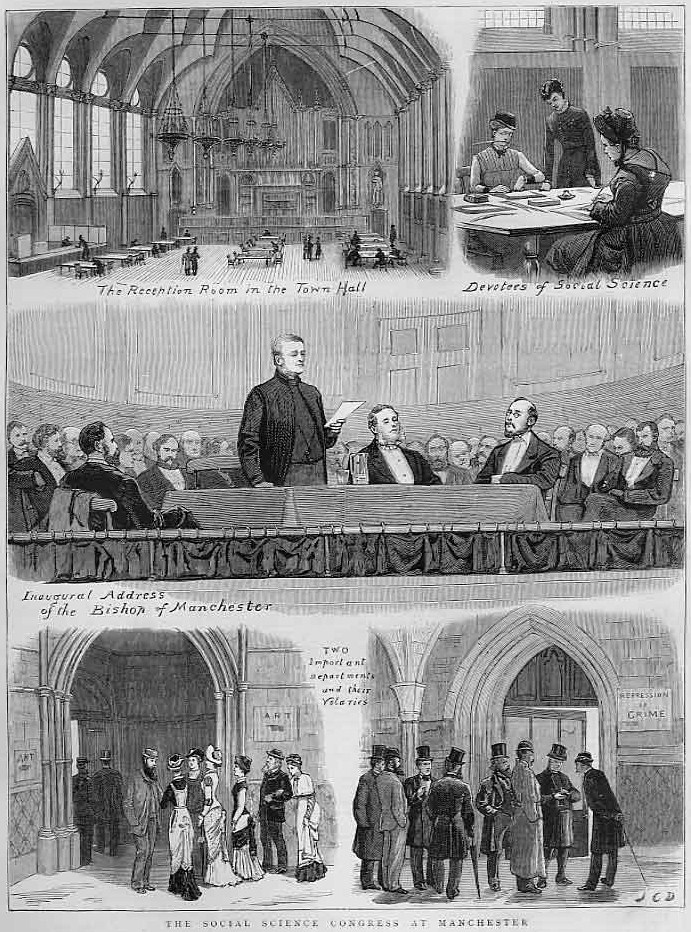
The Social Science Congress 1879, illustration from The Graphic

The efforts of George Hastings brought together three groups of the 1850s to form the NAPSS: the Society for Promoting the Amendment of the Law, the National Reformatory Union, and the Society for Promoting the Employment of Women (the Langham Place Group). It took as model the British Association for the Advancement of Science, holding an itinerant annual meeting, which provided a forum for social reformers.

The objective of the Association was defined as "to coordinate the efforts of the experts and the politicians". One factor in the eventual decline of the NSPSS was that the objectives of medical reformers changed. Legislation and the efforts of central government to improve public health became less important to them.

Its first secretary was Isa Knox.

== Congresses ==
Twenty-eight Social Science Congresses took place:

Year	Location	President
1857	Birmingham	Lord Brougham
1858	Liverpool	Lord John Russell
1859	Bradford	Anthony Ashley-Cooper, 7th Earl of Shaftesbury
1860	Glasgow	Lord Brougham
1861	Dublin	Lord Brougham
1862	London	Lord Brougham
1863	Edinburgh	Lord Brougham
1864	York	Lord Brougham
1865	Sheffield	Lord Brougham
1866	Manchester	Earl of Shaftesbury
1867	Belfast	Lord Dufferin and Clandeboye
1868	Birmingham	Henry Herbert, 4th Earl of Carnarvon
1869	Bristol	Sir Stafford Northcote
1870	Newcastle	Algernon Percy, 6th Duke of Northumberland
1871	Leeds	Sir John Pakington
1872	Plymouth	Francis Napier, 10th Lord Napier
1873	Norwich	Lord Houghton
1874	Glasgow	Lord Rosebery
1875	Brighton	Henry Austin Bruce, 1st Baron Aberdare
1876	Liverpool	Charles Gordon, 11th Marquess of Huntly
1877	Aberdeen	Earl of Aberdeen
1878	Cheltenham	Charles Bowyer Adderley, 1st Baron Norton
1879	Manchester	James Fraser
1880	Edinburgh	Lord Reay
1881	Dublin	Lord O'Hagan
1882	Nottingham	George Hastings
1883	Huddersfield	Sir Richard Temple
1884	Birmingham	George Shaw-Lefevre
1885	No meeting	N/a

== Committees ==
=== Trades Societies and Strikes ===
A committee of the Association produced Report on Trade Societies and Strikes (1860). This report was highly regarded: Sidney and Beatrice Webb later called it "the best collection of Trade Union material and the most impartial account of Trade Union action that has ever been issued". There were contributions by three Christian Socialists (Thomas Hughes, John Malcolm Forbes Ludlow, and F. D. Maurice). Hughes was one of two secretaries to the committee (with P. M. Rathbone). The committee included the Liberal politicians William Edward Forster, and Sir James Kay-Shuttleworth, 1st Baronet. There was one trade unionist as member, Thomas Joseph Dunning.

=== Quarantine Committee ===
The Association's Quarantine Committee was set up in 1858. Its report was published officially by Parliament.
