= Jessie Boucherett =

English campaigner for women's rights

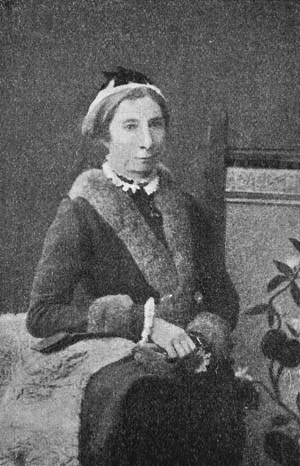
- Boucherett, ca. 1860
- Born: Emilia Jessie Boucherett; November 1825; Willingham, England
- Died: 18 October 1905 (aged 79)
- Occupations: writer, editor
- Known for: Society for Promoting the Employment of Women

(Emilia) Jessie Boucherett (November 1825 – 18 October 1905) was an English campaigner for women's rights.

== Life ==
She was born in November 1825 at North Willingham, near Market Rasen, Lincolnshire. She was the grandchild of Lt. Colonel Ayscoghe Boucherett and the youngest child of his son Ayscoghe and Louisa, daughter of Frederick John Pigou of Dartford, Kent. She was educated at the school of the four Miss Byerleys (daughters of Josiah Wedgwood's relative and partner, Thomas Byerley) at Avonbank, Stratford-on-Avon, where Mrs. Gaskell had been a pupil.

Boucherett's activities for women's causes were inspired by reading the English Woman's Journal, which reflected her own aims, and by an article in the Edinburgh Review about the problems of the many 'superfluous' women in England during the middle years of the nineteenth century, a time when there were far more women than men in the population.

On 21 November 1865, Jessie Boucherett with the help of Barbara Bodichon and Helen Taylor brought up the idea of a parliamentary reform.. They started a campaign to achieve the right to vote for women.

With Barbara Bodichon and Adelaide Anne Procter, Boucherett helped found the Society for Promoting the Employment of Women in 1859. This became in 1926 the Society for Promoting the Training of Women which today operates as the registered charity Futures for Women.

Also in 1859, Boucherett and Procter joined the Langham Place Group. A small but determined group which campaigned for the improvement of the situation of women, it was active between 1857 and 1866. Boucherett was a promoter of the women's suffrage movement and a strong supporter of the Married Women's Property Act. She founded the Englishwoman's Review in 1866, and edited it until 1870, when she founded with Lydia Becker the Women's Suffrage Journal.

== Works ==
- Hints on Self-Help for Young Women, 1863
- The Condition of Women in France, 1868
- 'How to Provide for Superfluous Women', in Josephine Butler, ed., Women's Work and Women's Culture, 1869
- 'The industrial position of women', in Theodore Stanton, ed., The Woman Question in Europe, 1884
- The Condition of Working Women and the Factory Acts, with Helen Blackburn, 1896

== Sources ==
- F. Hays, Women of the Day, 1885.
