= Victoria Press =

Feminist publisher in 1800s London

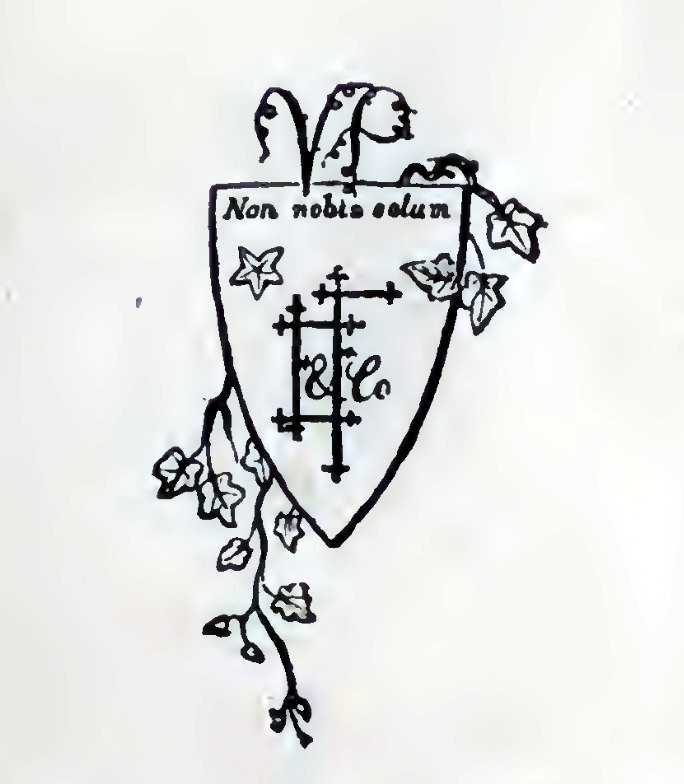
Imprint of the Victoria Press

The Victoria Press was a printing press started by Emily Faithfull, along with other feminist activists, in London, on March 26, 1860. The press, named after Queen Victoria, was created as a way to allow more women into the printing field. In 1867 management of the press was given by Faithfull to William Wilfred Head, a partner in the press. Head continued to print pieces advocating for the employment of women until 1882, even after buying Faithfull out in 1869.

== History ==
Faithfull was a member of the Society for Promoting the Employment of Women and co-founder of the Women's Printing Society. She was also awarded the honor of being printer and publisher in ordinary to Queen Victoria, indicating that Faithfull was the official printer and publisher of Queen Victoria. Faithfull was convinced that work as a compositor could be a well-suited trade for women seeking occupation since by the nineteenth century this was generally a well-paid industry. After learning type-setting, Faithfull founded the press, and then went on to train and hire other women as compositors for her shop. Despite generating hostility from the male-dominated London Typographical Society (then known as the London Society of Compositors), and The Union denying women access to compositor's work (using the justification that women lacked the mechanical ability and the intelligence to be compositors) Faithfull persevered, and her press continued for years.

Publications from Faithfull's press included The English Woman's Journal (1858-1864) whose inaugural edition was published by Matilda Mary Hays and Bessie Rayner Parkes and which promoted the employment of women. In 1863 Faithfull began publication of a monthly periodical called The Victoria Magazine, in which for eighteen years she continuously and earnestly advocated the claims of women to remunerative employment. The Victorian Debating Society was also founded by Faithfull in 1869, supplementing The Victoria Magazine by giving its members a place in which to discuss women’s issues. In 1865 Faithfull began printing another periodical, weekly this time, called Women and Work, which was followed by her other weekly periodical: the West London Express, coming into print in 1877. The press also printed a weekly newspaper by William Wilfred Head (before he began running the press); Faithfull, however, thought poorly of Head’s newspaper and printed a letter in The Times disassociating herself from Head's publication.

The Victoria Press had two homes over the duration of its time, the first of which was on Coram Street in London. Two years after the press’ opening it moved to Farringdon Street, also in London, and began printing using steam presses.

Beyond the press’ printing of periodicals and anthologies, those who worked at the Victoria Press were advocates for women’s involvement in the workforce. Many of the pieces that the press published promoted the idea of women working in fields such as clock-making, hairdressing, and engraving, along with other male-dominated professions. The press also printed pieces promoting the need for women to have educational opportunities equal to those granted to men and boys. Despite the multitude of contributors to the press, many pieces were published anonymously, so studying the press’ publications must be viewed as a collaborative effort of feminists of the time. This view of the press as a group project is furthered by the fact that the site of the Victoria Press was viewed, by its contributors, as a meeting place for those fighting for women’s involvement in the workplace.

Henry Houghton credited the Victoria Press with inspiring him to employ women as well as men as compositors at the Riverside Press in Cambridge, Massachusetts.
