= Bessie Rayner Parkes =

British writer and feminist (1829–1925)

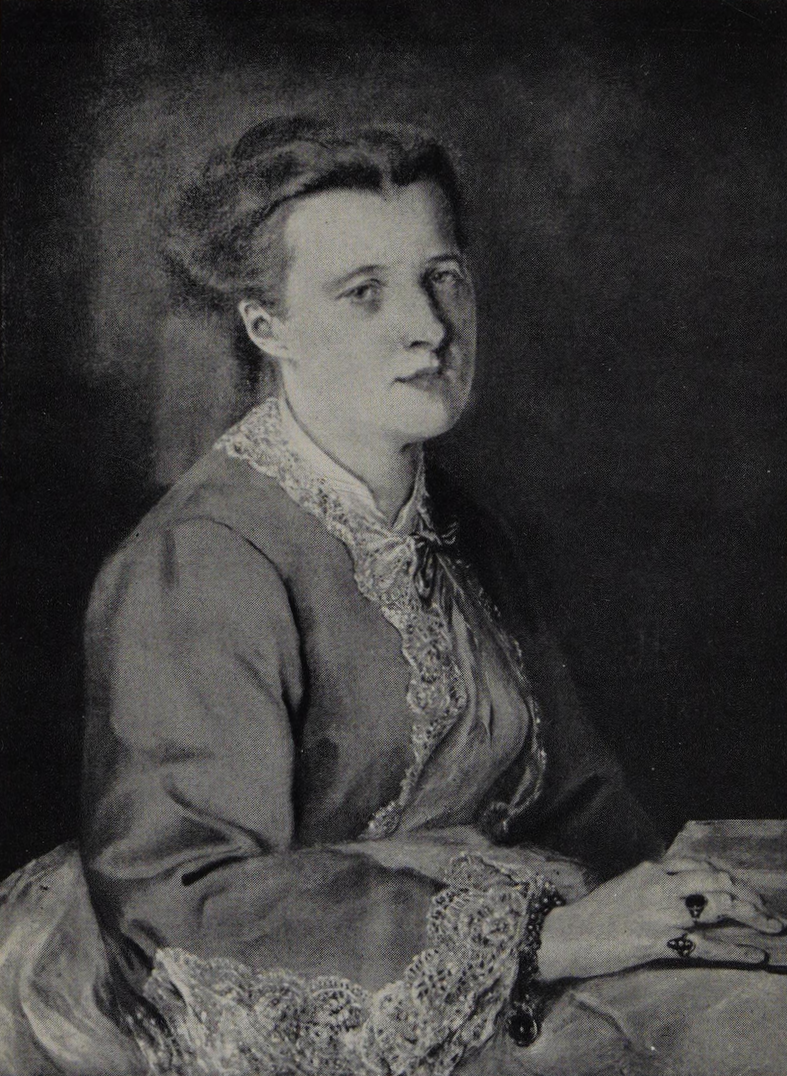
- Born: Elizabeth Rayner Parkes; 16 June 1829; Birmingham, Warwickshire, England
- Died: 23 March 1925 (aged 95); Slindon, Sussex, England
- Resting place: St Richard of Chichester Church, Slindon
- Other name: Madame Belloc
- Known for: Women's Rights Activism
- Spouse: Louis Belloc (m. 1867; died 1872)
- Children: Maria; Hilaire

Elizabeth Rayner Belloc (née Parkes; 16 June 1829 – 23 March 1925) was one of the most prominent English feminists and campaigners for women's rights in Victorian times and also a poet, essayist and journalist.

== Early life ==
Bessie Rayner Parkes was born in Birmingham, Warwickshire, England, daughter of Joseph Parkes (1796–1865), a prosperous solicitor and a liberal with Radical sympathies, and Elizabeth ("Eliza") Rayner Priestley (1797–1877), granddaughter of the scientist and Unitarian minister Joseph Priestley (1733–1804). Eliza always considered herself an American, having been born in Northumberland, Pennsylvania. Although not in great sympathy with her daughter over Bessie's strong wish to make changes in the status of women, Elizabeth nevertheless loved her dearly and did not actively oppose her; Joseph Parkes's support for his daughter's aspirations was moderate.

Unusually for girls of her background, Bessie was sent to a progressive Unitarian boarding school at age 11, a period of her life which she enjoyed. Parkes's passion for writing stemmed from the cultured life she was exposed to as a child, as her parents were avid consumers of the arts. Self-taught poetry was Parkes's earliest passion, which later led her to use her talents in her activism.

== Activism ==
Parkes became gradually aware of the unjust, contradictory, and even absurd situation of women in Great Britain, though there were many differences according to the social class they belonged to. The first endeavour that Parkes and her friend Barbara Leigh Smith Bodichon took on was to try to change the restrictive property laws that applied to married women (see Married Women's Property Act 1870).

Parkes also joined a group called the Committee for the Ladies' Address to their American Sisters on Slavery in 1853. The group of women worked to secure 576,000 signatures on their anti-slavery petition in the United States. Around the same time Parkes also was starting to advocate for the education of young women with her essay "Remarks on the Education of Girls". In this essay Parkes outlined her concern that women were limited to very few careers and criticised society regarding how little power women had compared to men.

Parkes was also indignant about the distinction made between "ladies" and "women". "Ladies", that is to say middle-class women, lost social status if they earned money, the only acceptable exceptions being writing, painting, or teaching, which for the most part meant governessing. Due in part to her efforts, by the close of the century, it became acceptable for a middle-class woman to acquire a proper education and train to do paid work.

Parkes and her activist friends interacted with women in other countries of Europe and in the United States, adding a very considerable international dimension to their efforts. In the 1860s, Parkes belonged to the first women's group which set out to obtain voting rights.

== Friendships ==
Bessie Rayner Parkes's wide circle of literary and political friends included George Eliot, Harriet Martineau, Anna Jameson, Elizabeth Barrett Browning, Robert Browning, Barbara Leigh Smith Bodichon, Anna Mary Howitt, Elizabeth Blackwell, Lord Shaftesbury, Herbert Spencer, Ralph Waldo Emerson, Elizabeth Gaskell, William Thackeray, Elizabeth Garrett Anderson, John Ruskin, Henry Wadsworth Longfellow, and Dante Gabriel Rossetti. Her most fruitful friendship was with Barbara Leigh Smith-Bodichon and Anna Mary Howitt, for out of their joint efforts grew the first organized women's movement in Britain.

The closest friendship Rayner forged was her friendship with fellow activist Barbara Leigh Smith. They met in 1846, and their friendship inspired much of Parkes's work. After a trip around Europe they both felt deeply inspired to pursue the activism they would carry out later on in their lives.

== The English Woman's Journal ==
Parkes became the principal editor of the first feminist British periodical – the English Woman's Journal – published monthly in London between 1858 and 1864. Its closure was due both to financial reasons and to the conflicts that arose among its sponsors and chief contributors.

Parkes was one of the founders of The English Woman's Journal and it later became the hub for those wanting to participate in the women's right movement. The offshoots that sprang from it were many and varied, such as the Society for Promoting the Employment of Women, the Victoria Printing Press (entirely staffed by women), the Law-Copying Office, and the Langham Place Group, where women gathered informally to discuss their lives or simply have a rest. The journal was a very important part of the community and the women's right movement in England as it provided many women with employment and an education that could never be taken away from them.

=== The Victoria Printing Press ===
The Victoria Printing Press was a business venture started by Parkes in 1860 to aid in her plan for the education of young women. As Parkes was a firm believer in all young women being trained in some skill, the printing press was a way for her to address that problem. Parkes herself did not know how to print when she purchased the printing press, so she hired a man to teach her and then instructed her staff how to print.

The Victoria Printing Press became the sole printer of The English Woman's Journal from 1860 until it closed in 1864. The press also printed The Transactions of the National Association for the Promotion of Social Science and other publications that were in line with the views of Parkes, Smith and their all female staff. Parkes is quoted to have said to the women she was employing in her printing press that learning such a trade was "One dream of my life".

== Conversion to Roman Catholicism ==
Another important part of Parkes's life story was her path to the Roman Catholic Church, to which she converted in 1864. After growing up in a radical Unitarian household Parkes, was familiar with Scripture from a young age. As she grew older Parkes found herself becoming more and more devout in the Christian faith. Comparing her earlier poetry to her later works, there are many Biblical references appearing while she was still a Unitarian, which only became more prominent as Parkes reached older age.

She kept up with events occurring in the Oxford Movement, but what impressed her was the social work carried out by Catholic nuns. She knew three English Cardinals personally, and recalled them in her writings.

== Marriage and children ==
Aged 38, Bessie Rayner Parkes fell in love with a Frenchman of delicate health, named Louis Belloc, himself the son of a notable woman, Louise Swanton Belloc. She met her husband on a trip to La Celle St. Cloud with her friend Barbara Smith, now Bodichon. Louis had never been the healthiest of men when they had met, being diagnosed with unspecified brain inflammation. They were married on 19 September 1867 at St. James Catholic Church in London. Their five-year-long marriage, spent in France, was lovingly recounted by their daughter in her memoir, I Too Have Lived in Arcadia (the title is a reference to Et in Arcadia ego). They soon had two healthy children, but Parkes did have one miscarriage. The family lived through the Franco-Prussian War and was deeply affected by it on a material level.

It appears that the family relocated to England prior to the death of her husband, at least temporarily. After the death of her husband Parkes moved back to England where she never truly got over the death of her husband. Their children, Marie Belloc Lowndes (1868–1947) and Hilaire Belloc (1870–1953), went on to become renowned writers in their different ways. In 1902, Hilaire, married and the father of three children, applied for naturalisation in Britain; he gave as his residence 104 Cheyne Walk, Chelsea, London and his occupation as a staff Lecturer of the University of Oxford extension scheme.

== Later life ==
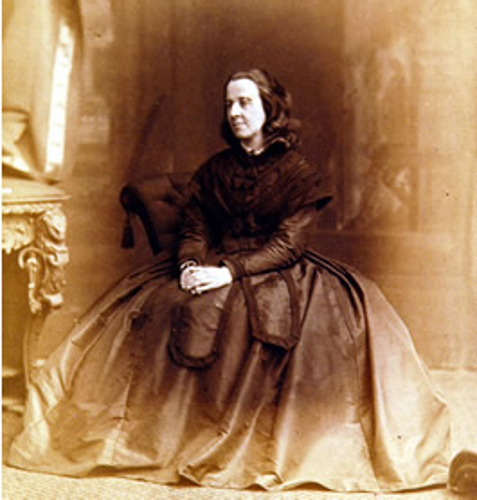
Parkes later in life

Parkes continued to write until late in life and remained a keen observer of politics and society. However, following her marriage and the death of her husband, her active involvement in the organized women's movements abated. She travelled in the United States with her son in 1896 and continued writing. Parkes published five more works in the last 30 years of her life.

Anguish over the stupidity of war and pride in her country coloured her feelings during the First World War. Almost at its close, her eldest grandchild, a Second Lieutenant in the Royal Air Force, went missing. He was shot down and killed near Cambrai, in France.

She died in 1925, aged 95. At her death Parkes left £3,688 (equivalent to £194,000 in 2025) in her will.

== Published work ==
Bessie Rayner Parkes published fourteen books: poetry, essays, biography, memoirs, travel, and literature for children and adolescents, as well as a very effective booklet on women's rights and dozens of articles. Much of her literary work was well received during her lifetime and her poetry was admired by John Ruskin and Henry Wadsworth Longfellow.

=== Poems (London, John Chapman, 1852) ===
Poems was Parkes's first book to be published. It contained 66 poems, most of written upon the theme of nature. Much of this can be attributed to the inspiration Parkes drew from her trip around Europe with her lifelong friend Barbara Leigh Smith, in 1850. The injustices she saw as she traveled around Europe were also an inspiration for her work and also sparked her need to advocate for women's equal rights.

=== Books by Bessie Rayner Parkes ===
- Poems (London, John Chapman, 1852)
- Summer Sketches and Other Poems (London, John Chapman, 1854)
- Remarks on the Education of Girls, with Reference to the Social, Legal, and Industrial Position of Women in the Present Day (London, John Chapman, 1854, 1st unsigned edition, 3rd signed edition 1856).
- Gabriel: A Poem (London, John Chapman, 1856)
- The History of our Cat Aspasia (London, Bosworth and Harrison, 1856). Illustrated by Annie Leigh Smith.
- Ballads and Songs (London, Bell & Daldy, 1863)
- Essays on Woman's Work (London, Alexander Strahan, 1865)
- Vignettes: Twelve Biographical Sketches (London and New York, Alexander Strahan, 1866)
- La Belle France (London, Dalby, Isbister & Co., 1877). Signed Bessie Parkes-Belloc.
- Peoples of the World (London, Paris & New York, Cassell Petter & Galpin, [1870]). Signed Bessie Parkes-Belloc.
- In a Walled Garden (London, Ward & Downey, 1st edition, 1895, 5th edition 1900). Signed Bessie Rayner Belloc.
- A Passing World (London, Ward & Downey, 1897). Signed Bessie Rayner Belloc.
- Historic Nuns (London, Duckworth, 1898). Signed Bessie R. Belloc.
- The Flowing Tide (London, Sands & Co., 1900). Signed Bessie Rayner Belloc.
- In Fifty Years (London, Sands & Co., 1904). Signed Bessie Rayner Belloc.
