= English Woman's Journal =

Defunct British women's periodical

- Chief Editor: Matilda Mary Hays; Bessie Rayner Parkes
- Categories: Feminism
- Frequency: Monthly
- Circulation: 1000
- Publisher: Emily Faithfull
- Founder: Barbara Bodichon; Matilda Mary Hays; Bessie Rayner Parkes
- Founded: 1858
- First issue: March 1858
- Final issue Number: August 1864; Vol 13 No 78
- Company: Victoria Press
- Country: United Kingdom
- Based in: London
- Language: English
- OCLC: 238692219

The English Woman's Journal was a periodical dealing primarily with female employment and equality issues. Associated with the Langham Place group of women's rights activists, a network of women's right activists whose main focus was advocating for greater opportunities and rights for women in Victorian Britain. Its publications heavily discussed the difficulties women found in the search for employment and explored opportunities available for women looking to enter previously male dominant fields. Alongside these discussions of employment and social issues, the journal included poetry that addresses family relationships, religious beliefs, charitable activities, and women's responsibilities within the household. The combination of these subjects presented a different perspective on a women's place is society during the nineteenth century.

It was established in 1858 by Barbara Bodichon, Matilda Mary Hays and Bessie Rayner Parkes. Published monthly between March 1858 and August 1864, it cost 1 shilling. After 1860 the Journal was published by Victoria Press in London, which was run by Emily Faithfull (1835–1895). She employed women workers, contrary to current practice in that period.

== Founders and aims ==
The Journal was established in 1858 by Barbara Bodichon, Matilda Mary Hays and Bessie Rayner Parkes, with others, Bodichon being the major shareholder and Samuel Courtauld also held shares. Parkes was the chief editor with Hays. Emily Davies (1830–1921) was editor of the Journal in 1863.

The Journal was intended as an organ for discussing female employment and equality issues concerning, in particular, manual or intellectual industrial employment, expansion of employment opportunities, and the reform of laws pertaining to the sexes. Subscribers were primarily recruited through social circles by Emily Faithfull and Bessie Rayner Parkes resulting in a audience of middle to upper class women who did not have to work for a living. The journal also included literary and cultural reviews not directly related to its central interests.

The journal encouraged woman to pursue employment in fields such as medicine, printing, and teaching, which offered limited opportunities for women during this period.It also discussed the difficulties faced by middle class women who needed to support themselves financially, when many traditional occupations were overcrowed or offered few opportunities for advancement.The journals editors viewed higher access to paid employment as an important step toward welcoming the independence of women and addressing the inequities between men and women.

Although the journal believed in greater employment opportunities for women, much of its readership consisted of middle- and upper-class women who were not financially dependent on their own income. This created a contrast between the journals efforts to encourage women's place in the working world and the personal circumstances of many of its subscribers.

It was "an important publication in social and feminist history", and so was chosen as one of six periodicals and newspapers to be digitized by the Nineteenth-Century Serials Edition project, funded by the Arts and Humanities Research Council.

== Like-minded women ==
The Langham Place group was the circle of like-minded women who gathered at 19 Langham Place, the Journal's office in Central London; it also included Helen Blackburn (1842–1903), Jessie Boucherett (1825–1905) and Emily Faithfull. Among the group's activities was the establishment of the Society for Promoting the Employment of Women (SPEW). SPEW aimed at preparing young women for wider employment opportunities, providing apprenticeships and technical training.

Established in 1859, the Society for Promoting the Employment of Woman worked to increase the number of jobs available to woman.One of the early on efforts included supporting the Victorian Press, which provided opportunities for women to work in the printing industry, a field that was largely controlled by the male workforce at the time.The society also supported the industrial training for working class women along with educational support and opportunities, with the goal of helping woman reach a status of independence through employment.

The English Woman's Journal was succeeded by The Englishwoman's Review, which started publication in 1866 and continued till 1910.
