= Society for Promoting the Employment of Women =

Early British organisation working to improve conditions around employment for women

The Society for Promoting the Employment of Women (SPEW) was one of the earliest British women's organisations.

The society was established in 1859 by Jessie Boucherett, Barbara Bodichon, Adelaide Anne Procter and Lydia Becker to promote the training and employment of women. The Dictionary of Canadian Biography says Maria Rye was also a founding member. In its early years it was affiliated to the National Association for the Promotion of Social Science, though formal connections between them were severed in 1889. The society's journal was the English Woman's Journal published by Emily Faithfull's Victoria Press.

When SPEW was founded, there were few occupations which accepted middle-class women, other than as governesses or as lady's companions. SPEW made it acceptable for women to be typists, hairdressers, printers, and bookkeepers.

In 1926 SPEW was renamed as the Society for Promoting the Training of Women. It changed its name again in 2014, becoming Futures for Women. It still operates today, as registered charity number 313700 and registered company number 0013103. Its papers up to 1991 are held at Girton College, Cambridge.
