= Langham Place, London =

Street in the City of Westminster, London

Coordinates: 51.5179°N 0.1434°W

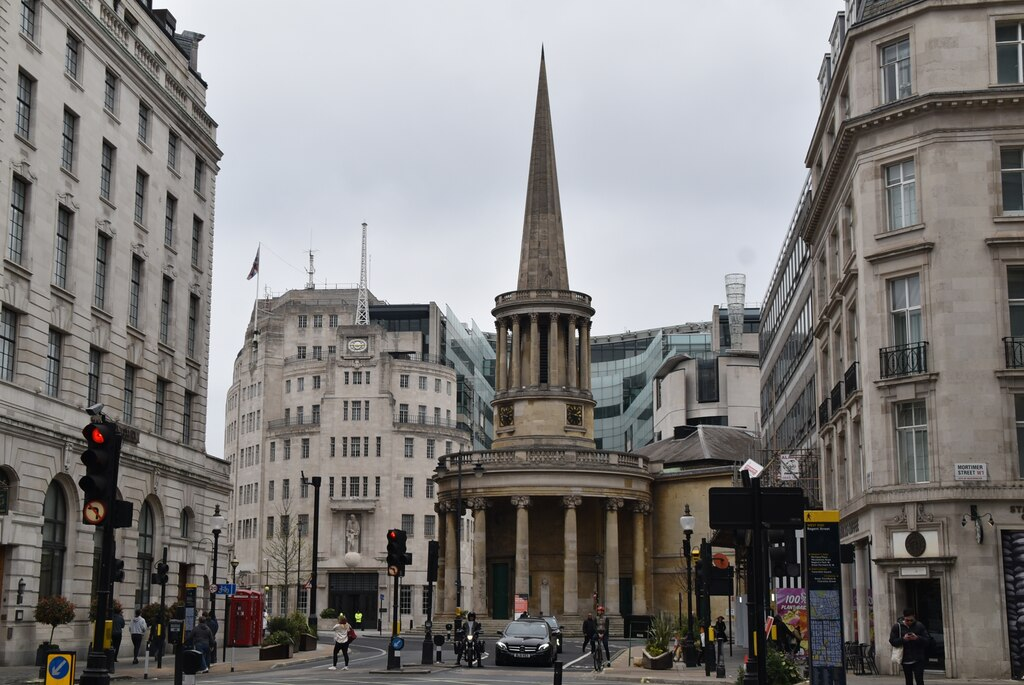
All Souls Church and Broadcasting House (centre-left) on Langham Place

A map showing the Langham ward of St Marylebone Metropolitan Borough as it appeared in 1916

Langham Place is a short street in Westminster, England. Just north of Oxford Circus, it connects Portland Place to the north with Regent Street to the south in London's West End. It is, or was, the location of many significant public buildings, and gives its name to the Langham Place Group, a circle of early women's rights activists.

== Buildings ==
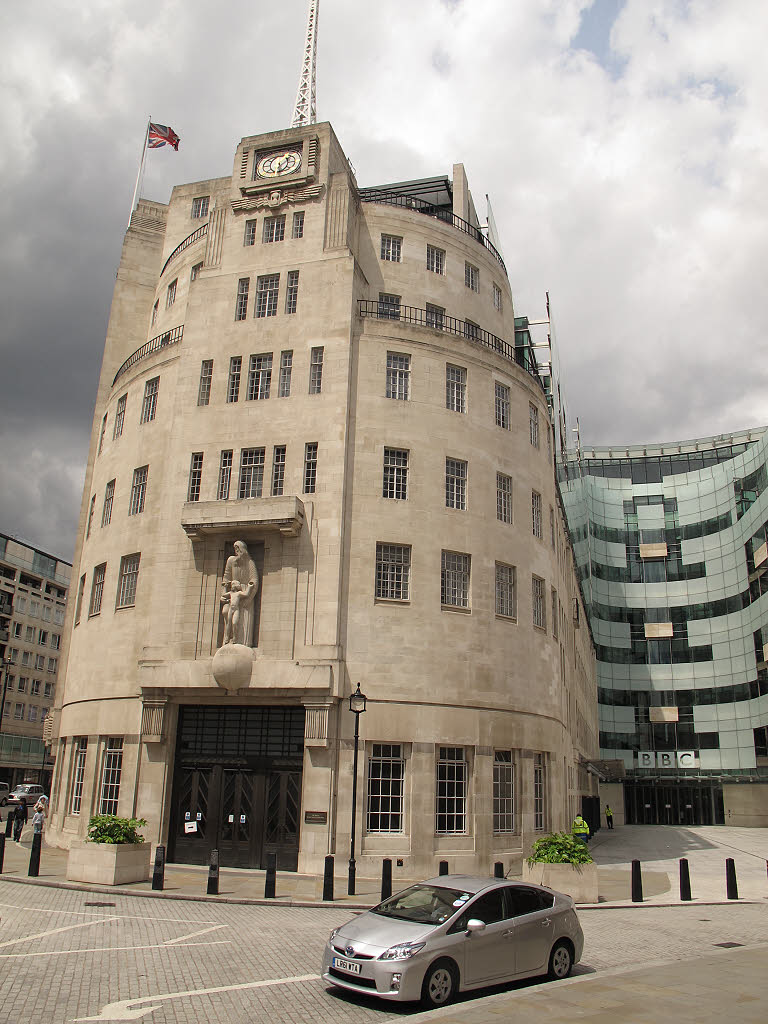
The BBC's Broadcasting House in Langham Place and Portland Place

There are several major buildings on Langham Place, including All Souls Church, Broadcasting House, and the Langham Hotel. Queen's Hall and St. George's Hall were also here until their destruction during World War II. The area is associated with the architect John Nash, although all but one of his original buildings have been replaced.

Starting from the north, significant buildings include:

=== Broadcasting House ===
Broadcasting House is the BBC's headquarters. It was built in the 1930s in the Art Deco style, designed by the architect George Val Myer. Several of the BBC's national radio stations broadcast from the building. The New Broadcasting House extension, home of BBC News, was built in 2005, and first used for broadcasting in 2013.

=== Langham Hotel ===
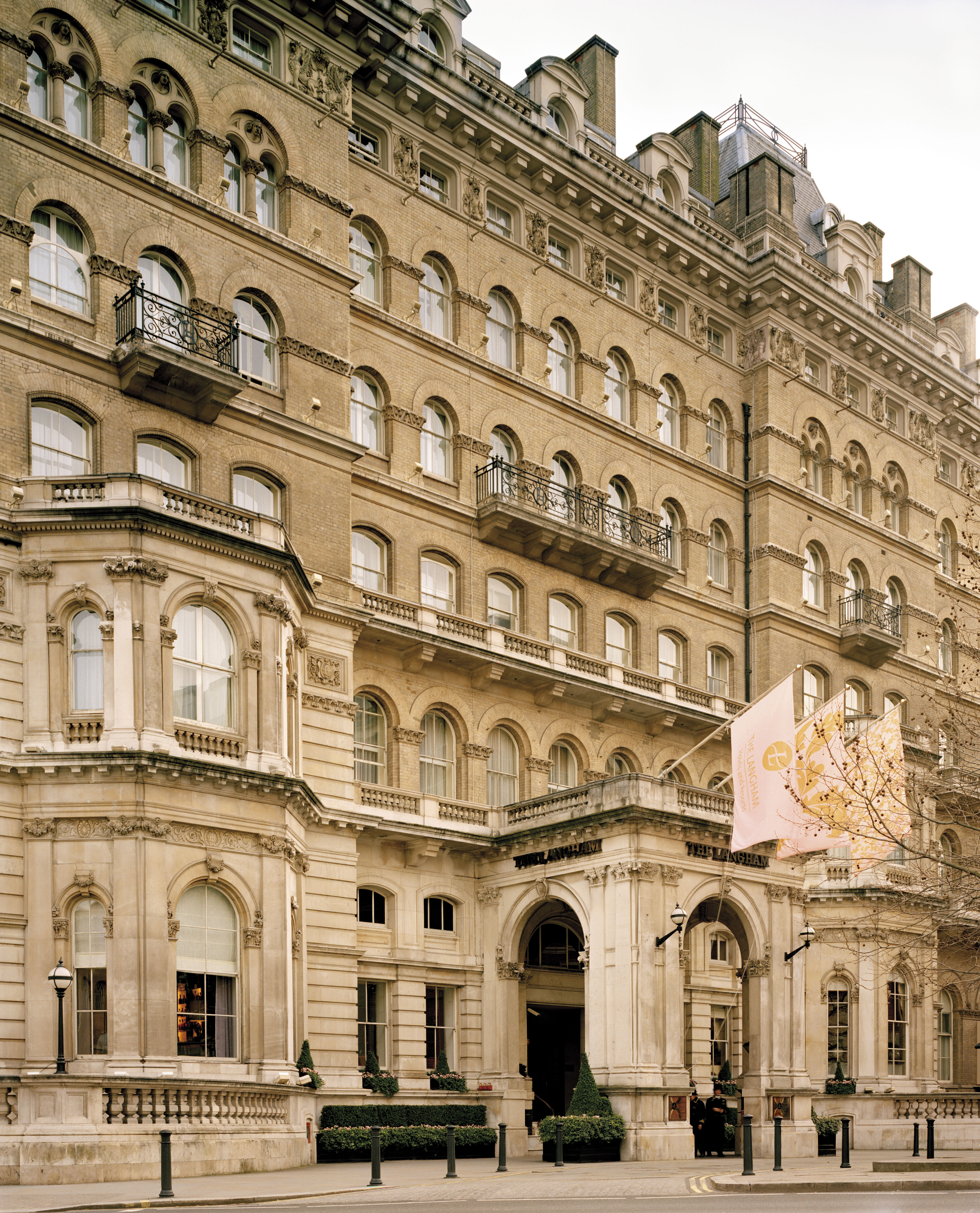
Langham Hotel in Langham Place

The Langham Hotel, on the west side of Langham Place, was built between 1863 and 1865 at a cost of £300,000. It is one of the largest and best known traditional hotels in London.

=== All Souls Church ===
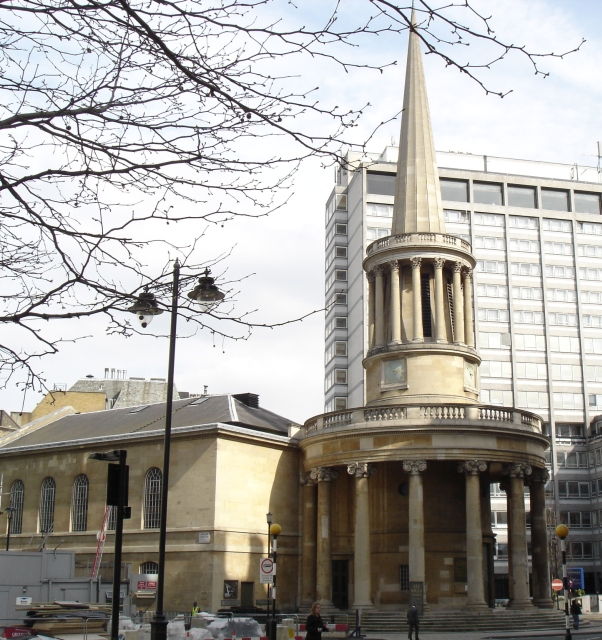
All Souls Church, Langham Place

All Souls Church, just south of Broadcasting House, has a distinctive circular portico topped with a stone spire. Completed in 1823 and consecrated in 1824, All Souls is the only surviving building in the area that was designed by John Nash.

=== St. George's Hall ===
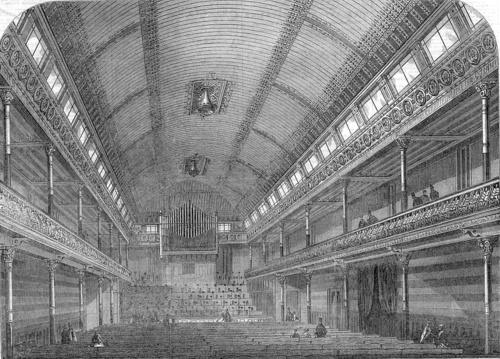
St. George's Hall interior, 1867

St. George's Hall was a theatre built in 1867 and closed in 1966. It could accommodate between 800 and 900 persons, or up to 1,500 persons including the galleries. The architect was John Taylor of Whitehall.

The hall was known for three decades for its presentation of the German Reed Entertainments alongside other musical works and lectures. After 1895, it was used for vaudeville, drama, magic shows, as the headquarters of the London Academy of Music, and even as a skating rink. In 1933, it became a BBC broadcasting studio but was shut down after extensive damage from bombing in March 1943. The theatre was demolished in 1966, and the St Georges Hotel and Henry Wood House now stand on the site.

=== Queen's Hall ===
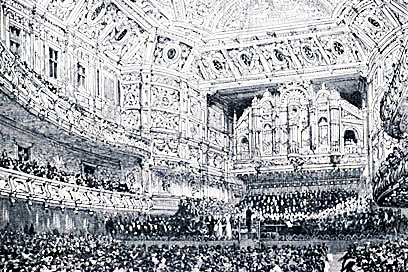
Interior of Queen's Hall in 1893

Queen's Hall was a classical music concert hall. It opened in 1893 but was destroyed by an incendiary bomb during the Blitz in 1941. It is best known for being where the Promenade Concerts ("Proms") were founded by Robert Newman, with Sir Henry J. Wood, in 1895.

== See also ==
- The Langham Place Group
