= Barbara Bodichon =

English educationalist and feminist (1827–1891)

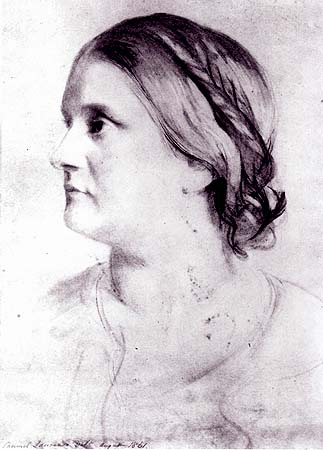
- Barbara Bodichon portrait by Samuel Laurence, 1880 (from a sketch in 1861)
- Born: Barbara Leigh Smith; 8 April 1827; Whatlington, Sussex, England, United Kingdom of Great Britain and Ireland
- Died: 11 June 1891 (aged 64); Robertsbridge, Sussex, England, United Kingdom of Great Britain and Ireland
- Other name: Barbara Leigh Smith
- Occupations: Educationalist; Artist
- Known for: Co-founder, Girton College, Cambridge
- Spouse: Eugène Bodichon

Barbara Bodichon (8 April 1827 – 11 June 1891), born Barbara Leigh Smith, was an English educationalist, artist, and philanthropist, a leading mid-19th-century feminist and women's rights activist.

In 1854, she published her influential A Brief Summary of the Laws of England Concerning Women, and in 1858 the English Woman's Journal.

With her friend Emily Davies, in 1869 Bodichon co-founded Girton College, Cambridge. Her greatest skill is said to have been as a facilitator.

== Family and upbringing ==
Barbara Leigh Smith was born on 8 April 1827, to Anne Longden, a milliner from Alfreton, Derbyshire, and Benjamin "Ben" Leigh Smith (1783–1860), a Whig politician, the eldest son of the Radical abolitionist William Smith. Her parents did not marry, as her father's radical views included the belief that marriage laws were harmful to the rights of women under the law. Barbara was the eldest of five children born to the couple; a brother was the Arctic explorer Benjamin Leigh Smith. Her father had four sisters including Frances "Fanny" Smith, who married William Nightingale (born Shore), their daughters were Florence Nightingale (the nurse and statistician); and Joanna Maria, who married John Bonham-Carter (1788–1838) MP and founded the Bonham Carter family. The Nightingale family refused to acknowledge the five Smith children due to what they perceived as illegitimacy.

Benjamin Leigh Smith's home was in Marylebone, London, but from 1816 he inherited and bought property near Hastings: Brown's Farm near Robertsbridge, with an extant house built about 1700, and Crowham Manor, Westfield, which included 200 acres (0.81 km^{2}). Although a member of the landed gentry, Smith held radical views. He was a Dissenter, a Unitarian, a supporter of free trade, and a benefactor to the poor. In 1826 he bore the cost of building a school for the inner city poor at Vincent Square, Westminster, and paid a penny a week towards the fees for each child, the same amount paid by their parents.

Smith met Anne Longden while on a visit to his sister in Derbyshire. She became pregnant by him and he took her to the south of England, housing her in a rented lodge at Whatlington, near Battle, East Sussex, as "Mrs Leigh", the surname of Ben Smith's relations on the Isle of Wight. Barbara's birth caused scandal, as the couple did not marry. Smith rode from Brown's Farm to visit them daily, and in eight weeks Anne was pregnant again. When their son Ben was born, the four went to America for two years, during which another child was conceived.

On their return to Sussex, they lived openly together at Brown's and had two more children. After the last was born in 1833, Anne fell ill with tuberculosis. Smith leased 9 Pelham Crescent, Hastings, which faced the sea, whose healthy properties were highly regarded at the time. A local woman, Hannah Walker, was employed to look after the children. Anne did not recover and so Smith took her to Ryde, Isle of Wight, where she died in 1834.

Smith, unusually for the time, sent all his children to the local school to learn alongside working-class children, rather than sending the older boys to a boarding or an elite day school. He later shared financial endowments equally with all the children, male and female, giving each an income of £300 per annum from the age of majority (21).

== Adult life ==
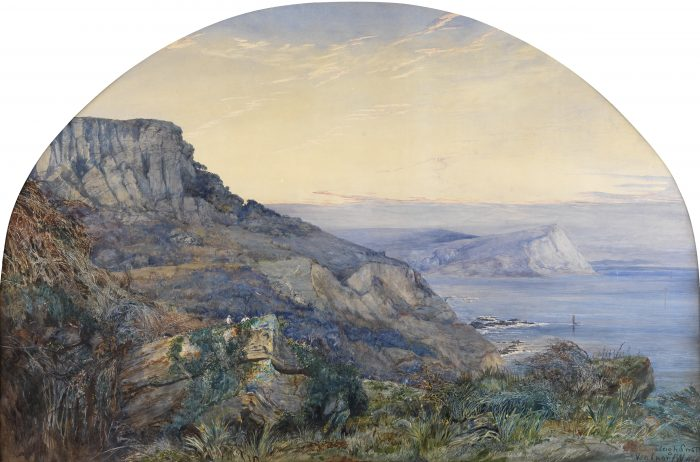
Ventnor, painted by Barbara Bodichon

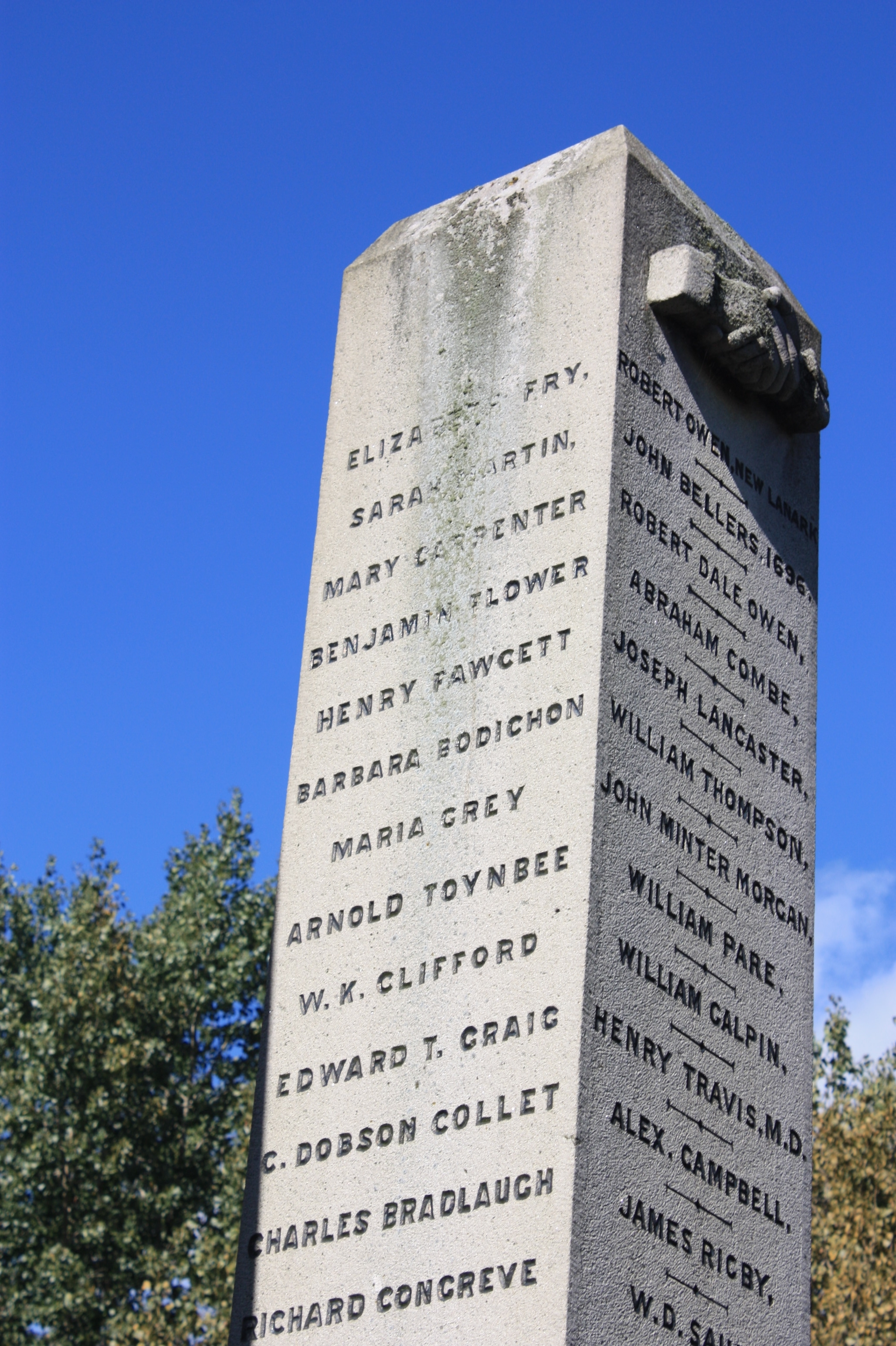
Barbara Bodichon's name on the Reformers' Monument, Kensal Green Cemetery

Early in her life, Barbara showed a force of character and breadth of sympathies that would win her prominence among philanthropists and social workers. Independent income gave her a freedom not normally possessed by many women and Bodichon and a group of London friends, including Anna Mary Howitt and Bessie Rayner Parkes, began to meet regularly in the 1850s to discuss women's rights which later became known as "The Ladies of Langham Place". It resolved in the first organised women's rights movement in Britain. They pursued many causes vigorously, including Married Women's Property. In 1854, she published a Brief Summary of the Laws of England concerning Women. The next year she formed a Married Women's Property Committee (MWPC). This committee included other eminent and established professional women writers and friends of her own generation, such as Anna Mary Howitt, Bessie Rayner Parkes and Eliza Bridell Fox. Leigh Smith drafted a petition which was circulated nationally with a request for signatures to support a Married Women's Property Bill. Seventy petitions with over 26.000 signatures were gathered in only a few months. At the head of the petition some respectable married women were placed such as Mary Howitt, Elizabeth Barrett Browning and Elizabeth Gaskell. This petition which was presented in parliament in March 1856 would pave the way for the Married Women's Property Act 1870.

Bodichon's first romantic relationship was with John Chapman, editor of the Westminster Review, but she refused to marry him and lose her legal rights. On 2 July 1857, she married an eminent French physician, Dr Eugène Bodichon, at Little Portland Street Chapel. Incidentally this was in the year that the Matrimonial Causes Act 1857, for which Bodichon had campaigned, allowed women access to divorce courts. Although wintering for many years in Algiers, Bodichon continued to lead the movements she had initiated on behalf of Englishwomen.

In 1858, Bodichon set up the English Women's Journal, a periodical which emphasised direct employment and equality issues for women, in particular manual or intellectual industrial employment, expansion of employment opportunities, and reform of laws pertaining to the sexes.

In 1866, cooperating with Emily Davies, Bodichon produced a scheme to extend university education to women. The first small experiment in this, at Hitchin, developed into Girton College, Cambridge, to which Bodichon gave liberally of her time and money.

In 1873, the Jewish-German émigré Ottilie Blind introduced Bodichon to Hertha Ayrton, who would later become a physicist, mathematician, inventor and researcher. Bodichon was Ayrton's most significant early mentor. She introduced Ayrton to the novelist and feminist George Eliot, and both women encouraged and supported Ayrton's application to Girton College. When Ayrton entered Girton College to study mathematics in 1876, Bodichon, along with Eliot, Helen Taylor, and Lady Louisa Sophia Goldsmid helped Ayrton cover the tuition fee of £92 per year (Taylor paid £25 per annum and the others paid the rest). Bodichon's friendship with Ayrton continued after the latter left Girton College. She supported Ayrton's British patent application for the line-divider, and along with Goldsmid, she advanced Ayrton enough money to take out British and international patents. In 1886, when Ayrton's daughter was born, Ayrton named her "Barbara Bodichon" after her mentor. When Bodichon passed in 1891, she left a legacy to Ayrton, which allowed Ayrton to financially support her ageing mother, hire a housekeeper to maintain her home and dedicate more time and energy to her scientific research.

Bodichon was a Unitarian, who wrote of Theodore Parker: "He prayed to the Creator, the infinite Mother of us all (always using Mother instead of Father in this prayer). It was the prayer of all I ever heard in my life which was the truest to my individual soul."

On 21 November 1865 Barbara Bodichon, helped by Jessie Boucherett and Helen Taylor, brought up the idea of a parliamentary reform aimed at achieving the right to vote for women.

Despite all her public interests, Bodichon found time for society and her favourite art of painting. Bodichon studied under William Holman Hunt. Her water colours, exhibited at the Salon, the Royal Academy and elsewhere, showed originality and talent, and were admired by Corot and Daubigny. Bodichon's London salon included many literary and artistic celebrities of her day. She was an early member of the Society of Female Artists (SFA) and showed 59 art works with them between 1858 and 1886. She was George Eliot's intimate friend and the first to recognise the authorship of Adam Bede. Her personal appearance is said to have inspired "the tall, red-haired heroine of Eliot's Romola with her 'expression of proud tenacity and latent impetuousness'".

Bodichon died at Robertsbridge, Sussex, on 11 June 1891.

== Education and activism ==
She was an English leader in the movements of education and political rights for women during the 1800s. Her marriage did not deter her from continuing her campaigns for women's rights to education.

Bodichon studied at the Ladies' College in Bedford Square founded in London, England in 1849. Here she was given instruction for work as a professional artist rather than an art instructor. Bodichon came from a liberal Unitarian family with a private income. Their independent wealth gave Bodichon more freedom to grow as an artist.

In 1852, after she had enrolled in Bedford College, she developed and opened Portman Hall School in Paddington, having researched practices at other primary schools, in conjunction with its first head teacher, Elizabeth Whitehead.

In 1854, Bodichon published A Brief Summary in Plain Language of the Most Important Laws Concerning Women, which was crucial in the passage of the Married Women's Property Act. In 1866, in collaboration with Emily Davies, she presented the idea of university education for women, being able to conduct the first experiment at a college in Hitchin, which developed into Girton College and of which Bodichon became a dedicated patron. She studied under the English artist William Henry Hunt to develop her skill in watercolours.

Bodichon belonged to the Langham Place Circle, a group of forward-thinking women artists who developed the English Woman's Journal. During the 1850s, this group fought for women's education, employment, property rights, and suffrage. In 1859, Bodichon, along with many female artists including Eliza Fox, Margaret Gillies, and Emily Mary Osborn all signed a petition demanding access for women to the Royal Academy School. Their request was denied, stating that it would require the Royal Academy to develop "separate" life classes. In 1860, Laura Herford, one of the women artists fighting for access, submitted an application to the Royal Academy School using only her initials. She was accepted, much to the embarrassment of the Academy. Herford's enrolment was permitted, and gradually more women artists were accepted in subsequent years.

== Grave ==
In 2007 Irene Baker and Lesley Abdela helped to restore Barbara Bodichon's grave in the churchyard of Brightling, East Sussex, about 50 miles (80 km) from London. It was in a state of disrepair, with railings rusted and breaking away and the tomb inscription scarcely legible. The historian Dr Judith Rowbotham at Nottingham Trent University issued an appeal for funds to restore the grave and its surroundings, which raised about £1,000. The railings were sand-blasted and repainted and the granite tomb was cleaned.

== Commemoration ==
On 30 June 2019, a Blue Plaque jointly commemorating the founders, Barbara Bodichon and Emily Davies, was unveiled at Girton College by Baroness Hale, President of the Supreme Court, as part of the college's 150th anniversary celebrations. The plaque is sited on the main tower at the entrance to Girton, off Huntingdon Road, Cambridge.

== See also ==
- History of feminism
- Women's suffrage in the United Kingdom
- List of Unitarians, Universalists, and Unitarian Universalists

English women painters from the early 19th century who exhibited at the Royal Academy of Art

- Sophie Gengembre Anderson
- Mary Baker
- Ann Charlotte Bartholomew
- Maria Bell
- Joanna Mary Boyce
- Margaret Sarah Carpenter
- Fanny Corbaux
- Rosa Corder
- Mary Ellen Edwards
- Harriet Gouldsmith
- Mary Harrison
- Jane Benham Hay
- Anna Mary Howitt
- Mary Moser
- Martha Darley Mutrie
- Ann Mary Newton
- Emily Mary Osborn
- Kate Perugini
- Louise Rayner
- Ellen Sharples
- Rolinda Sharples
- Rebecca Solomon
- Elizabeth Emma Soyer
- Isabelle de Steiger
- Henrietta Ward
