= Elizabeth Ashurst Biggs =

English Victorian-era novelist and activist

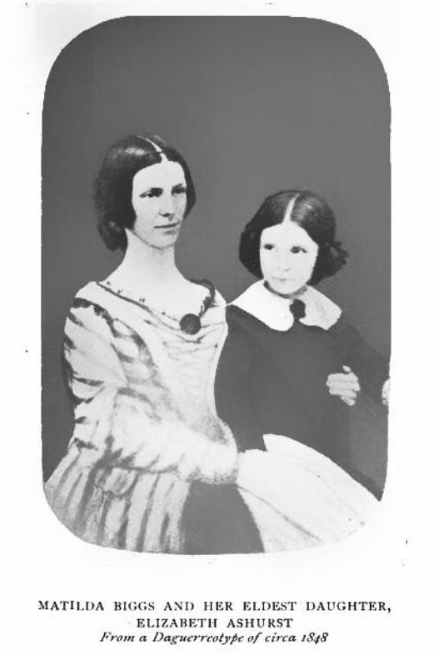
- Matilda Biggs and her eldest daughter, Elizabeth Ashurst
- Born: 1838; Leicester, Leicestershire, England
- Died: 21 November 1905 (aged 66–67); Hampstead, London, England
- Occupations: novelist and advocate for women's rights and anti-slavery
- Mother: Matilda Ashurst Biggs
- Relatives: William Henry Ashurst (grandfather); William Biggs (uncle); Eliza Ashurst Bardonneau (aunt); Emilie Ashurst Venturi (aunt); Caroline Ashurst Biggs (sister); Maude Ashurst Biggs (sister)

Elizabeth Ashurst Biggs (1838 – 21 November 1905) was an English novelist and advocate for women's rights and anti-slavery.

== Early life and family ==
The eldest granddaughter of the British radical lawyer William Henry Ashurst, she was born in Leicester, Leicestershire in 1838. She was the daughter of Matilda Ashurst Biggs (1818–1866) and hosier Joseph Biggs (1809–1895), the brother of MP William Biggs. The family spent her early years in Leicester. She was close with her mother's family who remained in London. In 1841, her aunt Eliza Ashurst wrote of Biggs' early political education to a friend in America. She gave the child a penny for her to donate "to help 'knock down the Corn Laws, and give poor people cheap bread' — which she learned and repeated with great pathos." When a toddler is encouraged to participate in politics, especially a girl in a country that did not foresee a time when women would be allowed to vote, it is not surprising that she would grow up to become civic-minded and engaged in national and international affairs.

Ashurst kept up the family tradition of literary output with her two sprawling novels. Her aunt Eliza Ashurst Bardonneau-Narcy was among the first to translate George Sand's novels into English. Her other aunt Emilie Ashurst Venturi published translations of Giuseppe Mazzini's writings and wrote essays on his Italian nationalism in addition to producing two novels. Her younger sisters also made their livings with their pens: Caroline Ashurst Biggs edited the prominent feminist newspaper The Englishwoman's Review and wrote frequently on women's rights. Maude Ashurst Biggs (1856–1933) was an advocate for Polish nationalism and translated Polish works into English, in addition to contributing 23 articles to The Englishwoman's Review. Kate Ada Ashurst Biggs (c.1859–1901) published articles in The Gentleman's Magazine.

== Writings ==
Biggs published nothing in her own name, but Susan B. Anthony attributed White and Black: A Story of the Southern States (1862) to her: "Given me by the author E. Ashurst Biggs, a sister of the editor of the Englishwoman's Review Caroline Ashurst Biggs" (signed and dated 25 December 1902). Substantiating this claim are two books about American politics from Elizabeth Ashurst Biggs' personal collection held by the National Library of Scotland. The three-volume novel follows the fate of Americans of European and African ancestry living in the American South in the years before the Civil War. It contains strong abolitionist arguments and shows the damage the institution of slavery wrecks on both slaves and slave-owners.

In 1874, Biggs published a second novel anonymously, "by the author of White and Black," called Waiting for Tidings. A signed edition to her father ["Joseph Biggs with dear love from the Author"] is held by the University of Illinois. The three-volume novel tells of the unconventional life of its heroine, May Cressingham. The plot exposes the dangers British women in late 19th-century faced in a legal system that handed all their property to their husbands. It includes explicit arguments promoting legal equality of women and implicitly calls for women's suffrage.

Although Worldcat.org and others attribute these two books to both Elizabeth Ashurst Biggs and her sister Caroline, it seems more likely that Elizabeth was the sole author of both books. Several obituaries for Caroline mention her authorship of the anonymously published novel Master of Wingbourne; none attribute White and Black or Waiting for Tidings to her.

== Personal life ==
Biggs was a correspondent with Giuseppe Mazzini, a dear friend of her mother's. He addressed her as "Lizzie" and "Ashurst," and she received letters and presents from him until his death. In 1850-51 the family lived for several months in Genoa, Italy (Mazzini's hometown), an experience that coloured her writing. Her books allude to Italy, and the last volume of Waiting for Tidings takes place on the Italian coast.

She never married and lived with her father and sisters for the rest of her life. She died on 21 November 1905 while living at the family home on 3 Alexandra Road in Hampstead, London, at age 67. Her will left a substantial sum (over £12,000) to her cousin on the Biggs' side, Thomas Ashley Crook, J.P.

== Bibliography ==
- Waiting for Tidings. Volumes 1-3. London, England: Henry S. King & Co., 1874.
- White and Black: A Story of the Southern States. Volumes 1-3. London: Hurst and Blackett, 1862.
