= Arethusa Gibson =

English Liberal activist and feminist

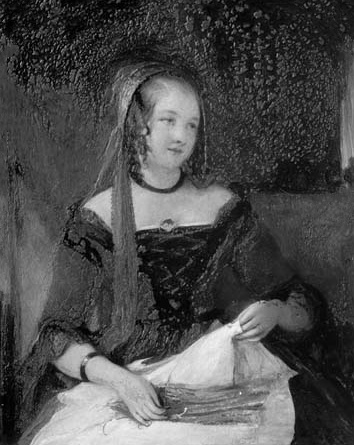
Portrait of Arethusa Susannah Gibson by William Boxall, R.A.

Susannah Arethusa Gibson (née Cullum, 1814–1885) was an English Liberal activist and feminist of the 19th century, who variously supported Giuseppe Mazzini and the unification of Italy, mesmerism and spiritualism, and opposed the Roman Catholic Church until joining it in later life. She was married to Thomas Milner Gibson, a leading campaigner for free trade.

== Biography ==
Arethusa Gibson, the daughter of Mary Anne Cullum (née Eggers) and Rev. Sir Thomas Gery Cullum, 8th Baronet, of Hardwick House, Suffolk, was born in 1814, and spent her early years mainly in Italy.

She married in 1832 Thomas Milner Gibson, who was to become a Conservative and later a Liberal member of parliament, and who advocated for free trade and against so-called Taxes on knowledge. Arethusa Gibson, acting as a formidable society hostess, established a salon of radical politicians, diplomats, literary figures and European emigrees; in her circle were Benjamin and Mary Anne Disraeli, Cobden, Dickens, Hugo, Thackeray, and Louis Napoleon, whom she had met in his exile.

Arethusa Gibson was an active supporter of Giuseppe Mazzini, who she met in 1844, in the struggle for the unification of Italy. During his exile in London, her salon provided a locus for his introduction to her wide circle of influential friends. In company with a group of like-minded and largely feminist friends, (Note: Amongst Gibson's friends in support of Mazzini, according to Richardson, were Elizabeth Ann Ashurst, wife of radical solicitor William Henry Ashurst, and their daughters Eliza, Matilda, Caroline and Emilie; Clementia Taylor; Emily Shaen; Jessie White Mario; and Dickens's favourite daughter, Kate Perugini.) she organised fund-raising events – bazaars, concerts, raffles – following a successful pattern established by women supporters of the Anti-Corn Law League, as well as assisting in the safe passage of letters to and from Italy.

The Oxford Dictionary of National Biography notes that Gibson had a number of children, only two of whom survived her; and was reputed to have had an affair with Sir George Wombwell, 3rd Baronet. From the 1850s she took an interest in mesmerism and spiritualism. On 23 February 1885, she died in Paris, where she had settled in the latter years of her life, and was buried in the Bury St Edmunds Cemetery on 3 March.
