= Orsini affair =

1858 assassination attempt on Napoleon III

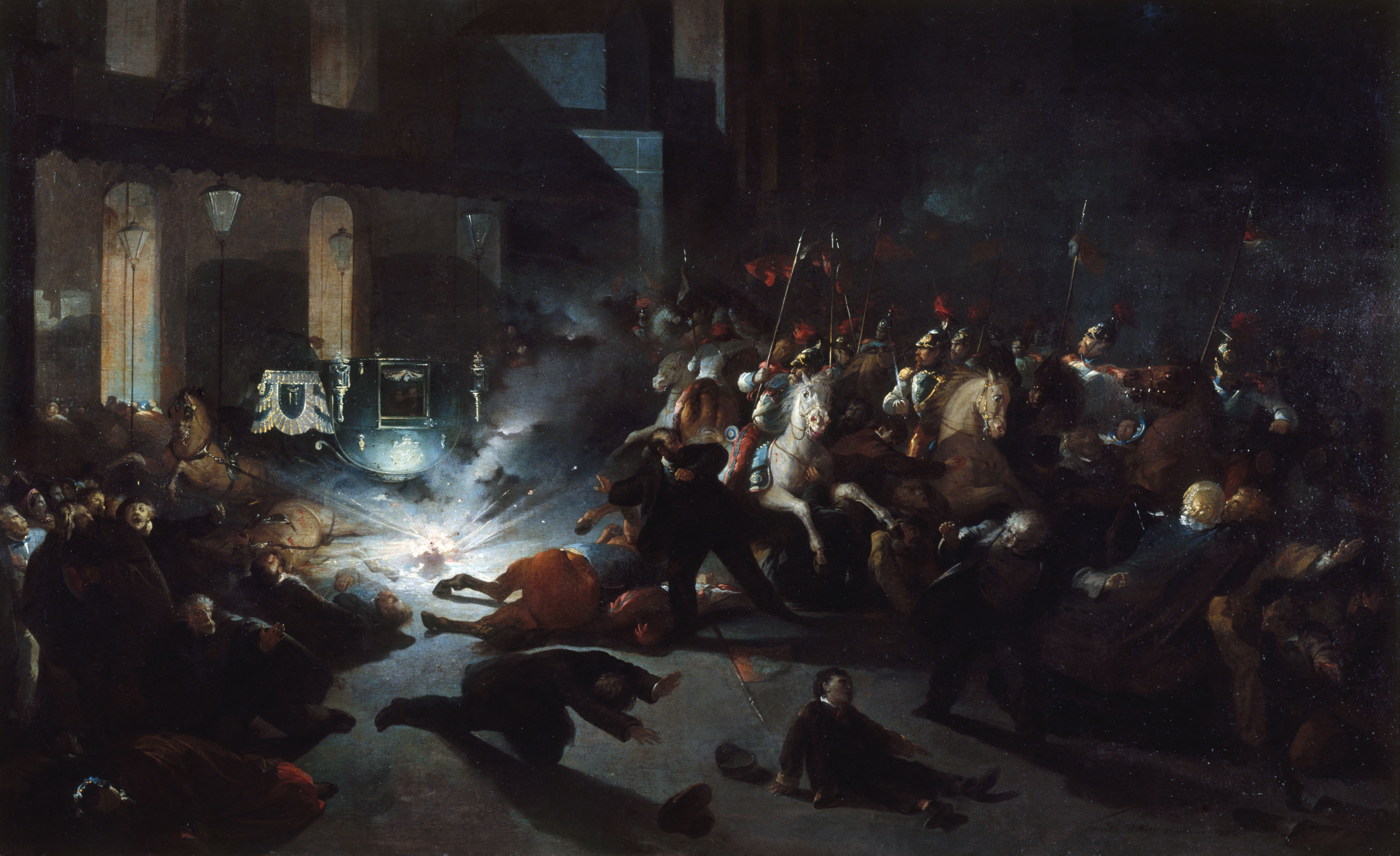
1862 oil painting of the attentat d'Orsini

The Orsini affair comprised the diplomatic, political and legal consequences of the "Orsini attempt" (French: attentat d'Orsini): the attempt made on 14 January 1858 by Felice Orsini, with other Italian nationalists and backed by English radicals, to assassinate Napoleon III in Paris.

In the United Kingdom the Palmerston government fell within a month; and some related trials of radicals ended without convictions, as British public opinion reacted against French pressure.

After the assassination attempt, Cavour in Italy was able to make France his ally during the Risorgimento.

== Background ==
=== Politics of the Risorgimento ===
The attack carried out by Orsini and his group was justified by its supporters in terms of the unification of Italy, a cause that Napoleon III was perceived as blocking. In the middle of the nineteenth century, this nationalist movement in favour of a united Italy, something that had not existed since Late Antiquity, drew widespread support from intellectuals, and was also championed by violent extremists. The expatriate Italian leader Giuseppe Mazzini worked a network of activists and fundraisers from London.

=== Asylum in the United Kingdom ===
British politics and diplomacy of this period assumed that political exiles and refugees should be given asylum. In the period from 1823 (de facto) to the Aliens Act 1905, the United Kingdom did not attempt to control or register immigrants. The Orsini affair was a severe test of the consequences of this policy. Besides Mazzini, Alexandre Auguste Ledru-Rollin, Lajos Kossuth and Alexander Herzen had moved to London: and Napoleon III suspected Mazzini and Ledru-Rollin of being behind a series of attempts by Italians to kill him, of which Orsini's was only the most recent. The existing British law on conspiracy made it a misdemeanour, and there was no extradition.

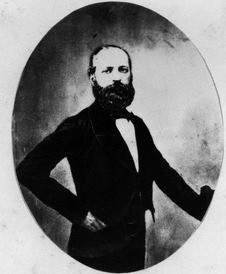
Felice Orsini

=== Context in British radicalism ===
In the year before the attack in Paris, Orsini had been a popular lecturer, touring in England and Scotland. The other main members of Orsini's group in the plot were both Italian and then in England, where they were known as language teachers. Giovanni Andrea Pieri (also Pierri, sometimes called Giuseppe) was reportedly living in Birmingham from 1853; Carlo de Rudio was in Nottingham. Birmingham was to be a key location for the plot.

Orsini had spent periods in England, and had made numerous contacts. The immediate context of the "affair" was, however, his falling-out with the group often known as the 'Muswell Hill brigade', around William Henry Ashurst. This occurred at some time during the middle of 1856. Orsini was a paid agent of Mazzini, but there was a terminal quarrel over some remarks he had made about Emilie Hawkes, a daughter of Ashurst, which were read by James Stansfeld, married to another of the daughters. According to Felix Moscheles, Stansfeld was opening Mazzini's letters by arrangement while Mazzini was out of the country; Orsini challenged Stansfeld to a duel. By 1857 Orsini was well known to have broken away and no longer claimed to be a "Mazzinian".

Orsini's plot involved other radicals. He learned about the chemistry of explosives from William Mattieu Williams, whom he met in 1857. More centrally involved were Thomas Allsop and George Jacob Holyoake. Thomas Durell Powell Hodge, a disciple of Orsini to whom he entrusted the care of one of his children, was also implicated, as was Simon François Bernard, an expatriate French surgeon and socialist.

Allsop arranged for the manufacture of "Orsini bombs" with a firm in Birmingham, and others tested them out in the countryside. Furthermore, Allsop provided Orsini with an old British passport under which to travel to France.

== Assassination attempt ==
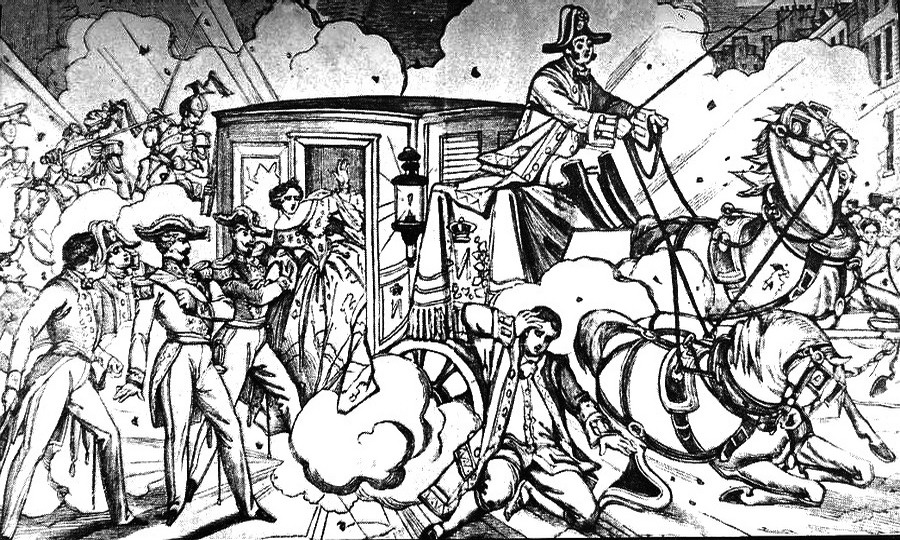
Orsini's attempt to kill Napoleon III: the second bomb explodes under the carriage

On the evening of 14 January 1858, as Napoleon III and Empress Eugénie were on their way to the Salle Le Peletier theatre, to see Rossini's William Tell, Orsini and his accomplices threw three bombs at their carriage. The first bomb landed among the horsemen in front of the carriage. The second bomb wounded the animals and smashed the carriage glass. The third bomb landed under the carriage and seriously wounded a policeman who was hurrying to protect the occupants.

The attack killed eight people and a horse, the Emperor's military escort taking the brunt. Estimates of the wounded ran to 150. The construction of the carriage protected the passengers: Orsini himself was wounded. He tended his wounds and returned to his lodgings, where police found him the next day.

== Arrest and trial of Orsini ==
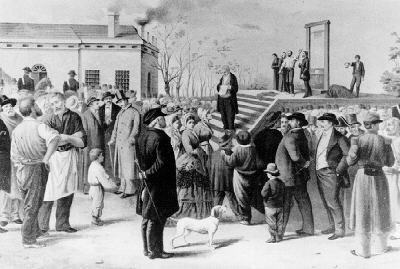
Contemporary representation of Orsini on the scaffold.

Orsini fled the scene of the assassination attempt, but was arrested shortly afterwards. He stood trial and was condemned to die by the guillotine. He left a detailed testament, and also addressed three letters to Napoleon III. He was executed on 13 March 1858, with Pieri who had also planned to take part in the attack but had been arrested, at La Roquette. Camillo di Rudio, another assassin, was convicted but later had his death sentence commuted to hard labour; later in the USA he took part in the Battle of the Little Big Horn, serving under Custer. Antonio Gomez, who was Orsini's servant, was also sentenced to hard labour. One of Orsini's letters to Napoleon was read out in court by his counsel; the second was published officially after his death.

Before the trials, early in February, Charles-Marie-Esprit Espinasse became minister of the Interior; he replaced Adolphe Augustin Marie Billault. His brief period in that post coincided with a time of internal repression in France, with the passing of the Loi de sûreté générale, and numerous deportations of political opponents of the Emperor to French Algeria.

== Consequences for French foreign policy ==
An immediate result was that Count Alexandre Joseph Colonna-Walewski sent on 20 January a despatch to George Villiers, 4th Earl of Clarendon, requiring the British government to restrict the right of asylum. The diplomatic consequences for Anglo-French relations were serious, and over the next two years British military planning against a French invasion was stepped up.

Walter Laqueur's opinion is that Orsini's plot was successful in political terms. This was because Napoleon III was in any case not unwilling to aid Italian unification. In July 1858 he met Cavour secretly at Plombières-les-Bains. This diplomatic move and resulting agreement presaged the Second War of Italian Independence of the following year, in which France was allied to the Kingdom of Sardinia against the Habsburg Empire, at that time in control of northern Italy. In August 1858 Queen Victoria and Prince Albert visited Cherbourg, being welcomed by the Emperor and Empress, in a public show of reconciliation.

== British domestic politics ==
The affair was exploited by Benjamin Disraeli, who was closely briefed by Ralph Anstruther Earle in the Paris embassy, against the Whig government of Lord Palmerston. Palmerston introduced into Parliament a Conspiracy to Murder Bill; but the measure was unpopular. Thomas Milner Gibson introduced a motion of censure on the government, and it had a majority of 19; it took the form of an amendment to the second reading of the Bill, mentioning that the French official despatch of 20 January had not been answered, and the Speaker John Evelyn Denison allowed it, over the advice of Viscount Eversley, the previous Speaker, that the resolution was not relevant to the bill. Palmerston's government therefore fell, and he resigned on 19 February 1858.

The year 1858 saw the creation of the National and Constitutional Defence Association, a pressure group for a volunteer military rifle corps, designed to resist invasion. Its secretary was Alfred Bate Richards. Hans Busk joined the Victoria Rifles that year, and campaigned vigorously for the expansion of volunteer forces. The Volunteer Force took form in 1859.

== Prosecutions in the British courts ==
The incoming administration of Lord Derby continued, however, the prosecutions Palmerston had set in motion. Allsop had escaped after the event to America, as Hodge did to Piedmont; Holyoake was not suspected.

The state trials turned the Orsini affair into a cause célèbre supported by British radicals outside the courtroom. John Epps stood bail for Bernard. Charles Bradlaugh started a fund for the defence of Truelove, and subscribers included Harriet Martineau, John Stuart Mill, and Francis William Newman. The atmosphere of the time led to attitudes being coloured by Francophobia and wild rumours. The French ambassador in London, Jean Gilbert Victor Fialin, duc de Persigny, was replaced after taking an aggressive line.

=== Bernard prosecution ===
Simon Bernard was an expatriate French follower of Charles Fourier. It was alleged against him that he had introduced two of the plotters, Pierri and de Rudio. He was arrested, on a charge of conspiracy; but with the change of government he was put on trial for involvement in one of the murders in Paris. Because the death had been abroad, a Special Commission was required.

Edwin James swayed the jury against the run of evidence, securing Bernard's acquittal. 1859 engraving.

Bernard was prosecuted by Sir Fitzroy Kelly in a jury trial before Lord Campbell. Edwin James spoke in Bernard's defence, and the jury acquitted him, against the judge's summing-up.

=== Truelove prosecution ===
Tyrannicide: is it Justifiable? was a pamphlet by William Edwin Adams defending Orsini's attack, published in February 1858. The publisher, Edward Truelove, then operated from 240 The Strand, London.

Truelove was prosecuted by the British government, on a charge of criminal libel, and causing a public outcry; included in the case was Stanislaus Tchorzewski, on the grounds that he had published a defence of Bernard by the group led by Félix Pyat. Adams, along with the Tyneside radical Joseph Cowen who had welcomed Orsini to Stella Hall, and William James Linton, had associated with Orsini when he had visited the North of England. Given that Cowen destroyed correspondence, the involvement of this group in illegal acts is now considered difficult to gauge. Possibly included in some way was the art dealer Charles Augustus Howell, based in Darlington, who was thought at the time to be implicated. He left the country, returning only in 1865.

After the verdict in the Bernard case, the government dropped these prosecutions. Mill commented on the Truelove trial in Ch. 2 of On Liberty (1859).

== Landor libel case ==
Walter Savage Landor was known to be a supporter of Orsini. This fact was used against him in a civil case for libel. Shortly afterwards he left England for Italy, for the last time.

== Imitators ==
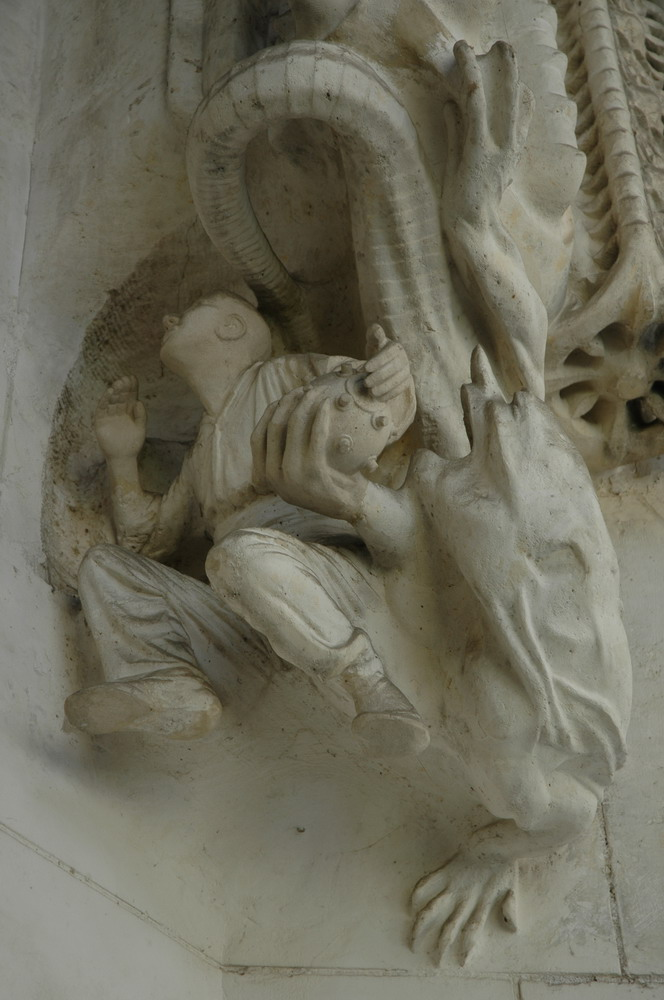
A demon gives an Orsini bomb to a worker. Sculpture from the Sagrada Familia, Barcelona.

In 1861 Oskar Becker tried to kill Wilhelm I of Prussia, and stated that he had been inspired by Orsini. Ferdinand Cohen-Blind, who shot and wounded Otto von Bismarck in 1866, was also under the influence of Orsini's example.

== See also ==
- Suez Canal Company
