= Thomas Hodge =

Thomas Hodge may refer to:

- Thomas Hodge (governor), British colonial governor
- Thomas Hodge (illustrator), English golf illustrator and painter.
- Thomas Hodge (Garibaldian), English supporter of Giuseppe Garibaldi

== See also ==
- Thomas Hodges (disambiguation)
