= Matilda Ashurst Biggs =

English women's rights activist (1818–1866)

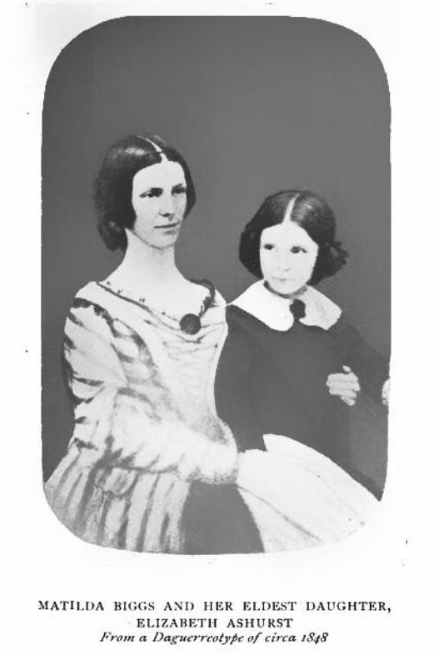
Matilda Biggs and her eldest daughter, Elizabeth Ashurst

Matilda Ashurst Biggs (c 1818 – 15 October 1866) was a member of the notable 19th-century British family of reformers, the Ashursts. Their circle of radicals was nicknamed the "Muswell Hill Brigade" after the family homestead. Alongside her family, Matilda Biggs promoted progressive domestic and foreign causes, especially working for women's equality in Britain and Italian unification.

Matilda was the second of the four daughters of William Henry Ashurst and Elizabeth Ann Brown: her sisters were Eliza Ashurst Bardonneau-Narcy, Caroline Ashurst Stansfeld, and Emilie Ashurst Venturi. Matilda did not publish under her own name, but contemporaries described as being very clever: "All the daughters were remarkable women, but Matilda's powers are said by one who remember her to have even transcended those of her sisters. She must, indeed, have possessed a rare intellect." She had one brother, William Henry Ashurst, junior, who became solicitor to the Post Office. Revealing their strong sense of shared family values, all the children embraced reform ideas.

In 1837, Matilda married a businessman, Joseph Biggs (1809–1895) whose two older brothers John and William would serve as Members of Parliament from Leicester. Like the Ashurst family, the Biggses were Unitarians with a penchant for radical causes.

Matilda Ashurst Biggs cultivated an international network of allies. As a young woman she attended the World Anti-Slavery Convention held in London in 1840 with her father who served as a delegate from Darlington. She befriended American abolitionists such as William Lloyd Garrison and Lucretia Mott. It was Matilda who wrote Garrison to inform him of her father's death in 1855. She entertained Ralph Waldo Emerson on his visit to England in 1847 and her correspondences to him are preserved in the special collections archived at Harvard University's Houghton Library. She had a keen interest in politics, as evidenced in an undated letter written to Emerson regarding Americans' need to expiate their sin of slavery.

Matilda was very involved with the movement promoting Italian unification and was close with Giuseppe Mazzini who became like another brother to the Ashurst family and was a houseguest at the Biggs residence. He was devoted to the Biggs family, sending even the children letters and gifts. Matilda worked alongside Felice Orsini in 1850 selling bonds to fund Mazzini's Risorgimento activities. She resided in Genoa, Italy with her two daughters and sister Emilie from 1850 to 1851. She joined the Society of the Friends of Italy upon its founding and worked until her death promoting the Italian cause.

Like her sisters and daughters, Matilda was supportive of women's rights. Helen Blackburn reported that she helped circulate Anne Knight's leaflet calling for universal suffrage in 1847. In 1859 she wrote a letter to the Newcastle Chronicle protesting women's exclusion from formal citizenship. She signed the 1866 petition calling for female suffrage presented in Parliament by John Stuart Mill and subscribed to the Enfranchisement of Women Committee. While living in Leicester, she and her sister Emilie set up a refuge for prostitutes. Matilda died after a long illness on 15 October 1866.

Matilda and Joseph Biggs had four daughters: Elizabeth Ashurst (1838–1905), Caroline Ashurst (1840–1889), Maude Ashurst (c.1857-1933), and Kate Ada Ashurst (c.1859-1901). None of the daughters ever married; they continued the family tradition of activism. Caroline Ashurst Biggs became a leader in women's rights campaigns in Britain and served as the editor of The Englishwoman's Review from 1871 until her death. She spoke frequently in public and was an active member of numerous political action committees. She wrote rousing political pamphlets and anonymously published one novel. Her sister Elizabeth Ashurst Biggs anonymously published two novels promoting abolition in America and women's rights in Britain. Their sister Maude was also involved in politics; she devoted herself to the cause of Polish nationalism and published English translations of Adam Mickiewicz's poetry in addition to 23 articles on a variety of local and international topics in The Englishwoman's Review. The youngest sister, Kate Ada Ashurst Biggs, published articles in The Gentleman's Magazine.
