= Caroline Ashurst Biggs =

Advocate for women's rights and a member of the Ashurst family of radical activists

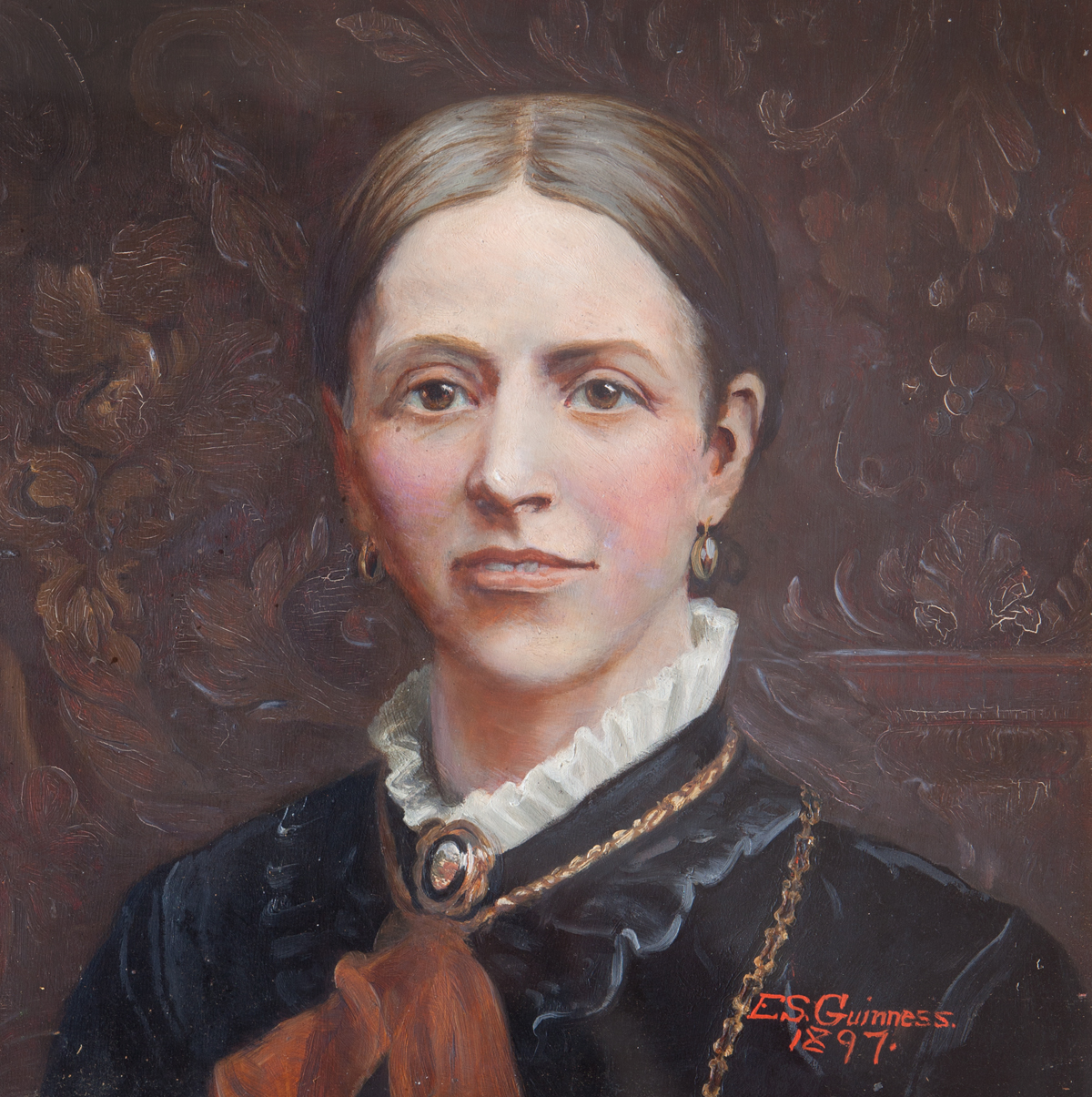
- Portrait of Caroline Ashurst Biggs by Elizabeth Sarah Guinness
- Born: 23 August 1840; Leicester, United Kingdom
- Died: 4 September 1889 (aged 49); London, United Kingdom
- Occupation: Suffragette

Caroline Ashurst Biggs (23 August 1840 – 4 September 1889) was an advocate for women’s rights and a third generation member of the Ashurst family of radical activists. Born in Leicester on 23 August 1840, she was the second child of Matilda Ashurst Biggs and Joseph Biggs. She died at 19 Notting Hill Square in London on 4 September 1889. At the World's Columbian Exposition in Chicago in 1893, her photograph was included in an exhibition of Portraits of Eminent British Women, in a section devoted to Pioneers in Philanthropy and General Advancement of Women.

== Family Context ==
On her father’s side Caroline Ashurst Biggs was niece to two radical Members of Parliament from Leicester: John Biggs and William Biggs. On her mother’s side her grandfather was the prominent British lawyer William Henry Ashurst, influential in radical causes from abolishing the church rate taxes to Italian unification. Her aunt Eliza Ashurst Bardonneau-Narcy was among the first to translate George Sand’s novels into English. Her other aunt Emilie Ashurst Venturi was the main translator and propagandist for the Italian patriot Giuseppe Mazzini, the editor of The Shield (the magazine for repealing the Contagious Diseases Acts), and the author of numerous essays. Her three sisters also left their mark in print: Elizabeth Ashurst Biggs (1838-1905) published two novels anonymously; Maude Ashurst Biggs (1857-1933) was an advocate for Polish nationalism and contributed 23 articles to The Englishwoman's Review; Kate Ada Ashurst Biggs (1859-1901) published two articles in The Gentleman's Magazine.

== Activism ==
Caroline Ashurst Biggs was a strong advocate for women’s suffrage. Along with her sister Elizabeth and her aunts Emilie Venturi and Caroline Stansfeld, she signed the 1866 petition for Women’s Suffrage. Biggs, along with her father Joseph Biggs and her uncle William Henry Ashurst junior, was active in the London National Society for Women’s Suffrage (NSWS). Biggs and Clementia (Mrs. Peter A.) Taylor were elected together as joint secretary in 1867. She served until 1871 when John Stuart Mill agitated to get her removed because of her support for the repeal of the Contagious Diseases Acts. He wrote to a friend about Biggs, “This only makes her the more dangerous, and she will infallibly spring a mine on you some day which will be successful... So long as she remains in the Committee, you have a quiet, steady opponent, who will betray you to the enemy, and take advantage from within of all your weak points: one infinitely more dangerous than Mrs. Taylor ever could have been, because she knows her own mind and can keep her own counsel.” In 1872 Biggs broke away from the NSWS to join the executive committee of the Central Committee of the National Society for Women’s Suffrage. This splinter group included her sisters Caroline Stansfeld and Emilie Venturi, and important activists of the era such as Ursula Bright, Lydia Becker, Frances Power Cobbe, and Helen Blackburn. Biggs gave dozens of speeches encouraging women’s suffrage across Britain, including in Suffolk and Wales. In 1870 when women gained the right to vote in School board elections, Biggs actively supported women candidates and gave speeches publicly supporting them at rallies.

Biggs was a member of Clementia Taylor’s group calling for the end of slavery: London’s Ladies Emancipation Society. Taylor changed the name after the Union victory in the American Civil War in 1865 to the London Negro Aid Society. She also was active in the Society for the Employment of Women, a cause frequently endorsed by The Englishwoman’s Review.

Biggs started, with others, the Society for Promoting the Return of Women as Poor Law Guardians to get women hired to work with other women and children in workhouses. The Society reprinted and distributed her editorial Women as Poor Law Guardians. She encouraged the formation of local committees and organized meetings. It was, in fact, James Stansfeld, the husband of her aunt Caroline Stansfeld, who appointed the first woman as a poor-law inspector in 1872 (Jane Elizabeth (Mrs. Nassau) Senior). At the time of her death, 76 women served in this capacity.

Biggs activism included a moral dimension. Unlike her sister Kate and her aunt Caroline Stansfeld she was not a member of the Moral Reform Union. But she did sign an 1889 petition opposing the candidacy of Charles Dilke because of his divorce.

== Writings ==
Caroline Ashurst Biggs wrote all her life. In an obituary, “A friend” wrote of her many accomplishments, all made with her “facile pen and fertile brain.” During her free time as a school girl, Biggs busied herself “collating and copying out the speeches of the Italian patriot and close family friend Giuseppe Mazzini for reproduction in a provincial newspaper.” He also wrote directly to her.

Biggs published The Master of Wingbourne, a novel in two volumes, anonymously in 1866 when she was in her mid-twenties, but her obituary credits her as the author. The book was widely reviewed as “well told” and “deeply interesting.” It opens in 1830 and tells the story of the estate of Wingbourne through the eyes of a visitor. The owner and his nephew are drunkards; his daughter Florence is a victim of overindulgence and under-education, but the object of the narrator’s affections nonetheless. The book sets up feminist themes - Florence is cut out of inheriting because of her illegitimacy; the nephew and heir tries to force Florence to marry him by locking her in the house. She is betrothed three times in the story, which is ultimately a cautionary tale about marriage, power, wealth. Biggs herself never married, nor did her three sisters. Her sister Elizabeth Ashurst Biggs published two novels (White and Black (1862) and Waiting for Tidings (1874)), which have been mistakenly attributed to C. A. Biggs as author or co-author.

Biggs also published two short stories under the pseudonym Carey Search (inspired by her grandfather William Henry Ashurst who published articles in American and British newspapers as Edward Search), both focusing on issues related to women’s suffrage.

In 1870 Biggs became the editor of the Englishwoman’s Review, the longest-running English feminist publication of the era. For almost twenty years she shaped the “only complete, continuous record of the work done …by women, in this country and abroad, and of the progress of what has been termed the ‘Woman Question.’” She also contributed articles and corresponded with secretaries of women’s societies abroad, especially in Italy, France, and Norway.

Elizabeth Cady Stanton, Susan B. Anthony, and Matilda Joslyn Gage commissioned Biggs to write the chapter on Great Britain for volume III of their groundbreaking survey of early feminism: The History of Woman Suffrage. It was published in 1887.

== Legacy ==
After her death her colleagues set up a loan fund to assist women students of Cambridge attending Girton College. In fact her youngest sister Kate Ada Ashurst Biggs attended Girton from 1877 to 1879 before withdrawing from ill health. In 1897 Elizabeth Guinness painted a portrait of Biggs, Lydia Becker and others to decorate bookcases. Guinness had known Biggs when she was alive. The bookcase, the books and the portraits were left by Helen Blackburn to Girton College.

== Publications ==
- Report of a public meeting held in the Hanover Square Rooms, London, on Monday, April 28, 1873. National Society for Women’s Suffrage. Central Committee. London: Central Committee, 1873. CA Biggs & Lydia Becker attended, Becker spoke. Held by Girton College, Blackburn Collection.
- Anon [credited in CAB obituary]. Master of Wingbourne. Vols 1-2. London: T. Cautley Newby, 1866.
- Biggs, Caroline Ashurst. A Letter from an Englishwoman to Englishwomen. London: Central Committee of the National Society for Women's Suffrage, 1889.
- Biggs, C. A. Some Notes Upon the Election of Guardians of the Poor. London: Society for Promoting the Return of Women as Poor Law Guardians, 1887. JSTOR 60241230.
- Biggs, C. A. Women As Poor Law Guardians. (Reprinted from Englishwoman's Review, &C.). 1888.
- Biggs, C. A., and William Wood. C. A. Biggs Letter: To William Wood. 1860.
- Biggs, C.A., ed. of The Englishwoman’s Review from 1871 until 1889. (aka The Englishwoman's Review of Social and Industrial Questions.)
- Biggs, C.A., Ought Women to have votes in Parliament (mentioned in Women’s Suffrage Movement by Helen Blackburn)
- Search, Carey (pseudonym for Caroline Ashurst Biggs). Annie's Baby. Westminster: Women's Printing Society.
- Circulars & memoranda of the women's suffrage societies in the first ten years of the movement (continued to 1880) / collected by Helen Blackburn; aided by Miss Becker & Miss C.A. Biggs. National Society for Women's Suffrage (Great Britain) [s.l.]: [s.n.]. [1867-1881]. Available in Girton College, Blackburn Collection
