= Maude Ashurst Biggs =

British translator and Polish nationalist

- Born: Maude Biggs; 26 December 1856; Mayfair, London, England
- Died: 14 July 1933 (aged 76)
- Occupation: translator
- Known for: translating Polish nationalist epic poems

Maude Ashurst Biggs, born Maude Biggs (26 December 1856 – 14 July 1933) was a British translator and Polish nationalist.

== Life ==
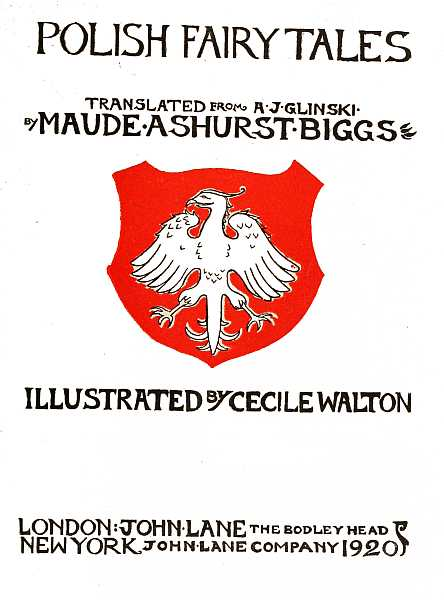
Polish Fairy Tales translated in 1920 and illustrated by Cecile Walton

Biggs was born in Mayfair in 1857. Her mother was Matilda Ashurst Biggs and she had married Joseph Biggs. She had two elder sisters: Elizabeth Ashurst (1838–1905) and Caroline Ashurst (1840–1889). Her younger sister was Kate Ada Ashurst (c.1859–1901). None of the daughters ever married; they were part of a family who over three generations campaigned for change. Her family rejected most conventional values but not the importance of family. Caroline Ashurst Biggs became a leader in women's rights campaigns in Britain and served as the editor of The Englishwoman's Review from 1871 until her death. Sister number two was Elizabeth Ashurst Biggs who anonymously published two novels promoting abolition in America and women's rights in Britain. Her younger sister, Kate Ada Ashurst Biggs, published articles in The Gentleman's Magazine.

Maude inherited the cause of Polish nationalism from her mother and she joined the Literary Association of the Friends of Poland. She published English translations of Adam Mickiewicz's epic poetry. In 1882 she published her translation of Mickiewicz's epic poem Konrad Wallenrod which had somehow not been censored by the Russians and in 1885 she published her translation of another of his epic poems Master Thaddeus, or, The Last Foray in Lithuania. She wrote over twenty articles on a variety of topics in The Englishwoman's Review.

In 1920 her translation of A J Glinski's Polish Fairy Tales was published by John Lane of London and New York. The book featured full colour illustrations by Cecile Walton.
