= Central Committee of the National Society for Women's Suffrage =

Central Committee of the National Society for Women's Suffrage was a committee formed in 1872 in London to lobby parliament. It was initially led by activists from Manchester. It was known as the Central National Society for Women's Suffrage from 1900. It underwent a number of changes before becoming the Fawcett Society in 1953.

== History ==
Jacob Bright suggested in 1871 that it would be useful to create a London-based organisation to lobby members of parliament concerning women's suffrage. The Central Committee of the National Society for Women's Suffrage first met on 17 January 1872. The first committee included Frances Power Cobbe, Priscilla Bright McLaren, Lilias Ashworth Hallett and Agnes Garrett. The committee introduced a subscription fee of a shilling per annum. Millicent Fawcett joined the committee in 1874.

In the year 1900 the two organizations Central and Western Society for Women's Suffrage and the Central and East of England Society for Women's Suffrage merged and formed Central Society for Women's Suffrage.

Lydia Becker became the chair of the committee in 1881. Other committee members then included Helen Blackburn, Millicent Fawcett, Jessie Boucherett, Eva McLaren, Margaret Bright Lucas as well as Priscilla Bright McLaren and Frances Power Cobbe.
