= W. E. Adams =

English Radical and journalist

William Edwin Adams (11 February 1832 – 13 May 1906) was an English Radical and journalist.

== Early life ==
Adams was born in Cheltenham, Gloucestershire, England, the son of a tramping plasterer. He was brought up by his maternal grandmother Anne Wells, a widow and washerwoman. With her daughters, also washerwomen, his family supported a sporadic education for him, at the academy run by Joseph Gardner in the former New Clarence Theatre, and a dame school. He read the Arabian Nights, Gulliver's Travels and Pilgrim's Progress.

In 1846 Adams was apprenticed for seven years as a printer to John Joseph Hadley, who owned the Cheltenham Journal. He attended popular lectures in Cheltenham, and heard George Dawson speak. At this period he was a Chartist, involved in local meetings of the National Charter Association, and a supporter of the Fraternal Democrats. He attributed his radicalisation to a periodical of George W. M. Reynolds, Reynolds's Political Instructor.

In 1851 Adams founded the Cheltenham Republic Association, through which he met William James Linton. In 1854 he moved to Brantwood and the republican community there to assist Linton as a compositor on the English Republic. The following year he left, for London. Also there as a compositor and colleague from Cheltenham was Thomas Hailing, later owner of the Oxford Printing Works.

In London Adams worked at the Illustrated London News and Illustrated Times and contributed to the National Reformer edited by Charles Bradlaugh, as "Caractacus", on radical and abolitionist issues. He attended radical lectures by Bradlaugh, Thomas Cooper, George Jacob Holyoake, and Bronterre O'Brien in a Shoe Lane tavern off Fleet Street. His 1858 pamphlet Tyrannicide: is it Justifiable? was apologetics for the Orsini plot. Its publisher Edward Truelove was prosecuted. The "Government Press Prosecutions" of 1858, and tyrannicide, were referenced in a footnote to On Liberty (1859) by John Stuart Mill.

With a recommendation from Bradlaugh to Joseph Cowen, who had known him from English Republic days, Adams wrote extensively for the Newcastle Chronicle (Daily Chronicle and Northern Counties Advertiser from 1858). In that newspaper, he used the pseudonym "Ironside". Todd considers that Adams had been living in "near-poverty"; he married in 1858.

== In Newcastle ==
From 1864 until retiring in 1900, Adams was editor of the Newcastle Weekly Chronicle, where (as "Ironside") he advanced internationalism, trade unionism, the co-operative movement and Lib-Labism. Cowen and Adams campaigned successfully to have Thomas Burt elected Liberal Member of Parliament for Morpeth in 1874. Adams was out of sympathy with the socialism of the 1880s.

After illness, Adams downplayed politics in favour of local concerns: bowling greens for workers, tree planting and free libraries and parks. He spent winters in Funchal on Madeira, where he died and was buried. A marble bust of Adams was unveiled by Thomas Burt MP on the first anniversary of his death.

== Views ==
Adams was influenced by the works of Thomas Paine and Giuseppe Mazzini, whom he regarded as "the greatest teacher since Christ". He also believed that community self-government and community representation to be "the essence of all political liberalism that is worthy of the name".

Adams believed that the American Civil War "was the greatest question of the centuries. It was greater than the Great Rebellion, greater than the French Revolution, greater than the war of Independence...as great as any that has been fought out since history began".

== Papers ==
An archive of Adams's papers is held by the Russian State Archive of Socio-Political History.
