= Lydia Becker =

British amateur scientist and suffragist (1827–1890)

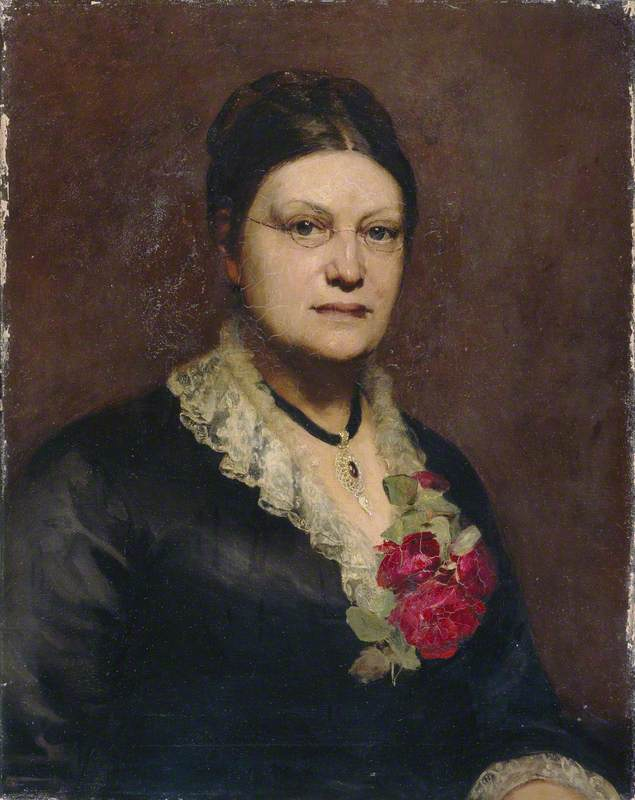
- Portrait by fellow suffragist Susan Isabel Dacre
- Born: Lydia Ernestine Becker; 24 February 1827; Cooper Street, Deansgate, Manchester, Lancashire, England
- Died: 18 July 1890 (aged 63); Geneva, Switzerland
- Resting place: Cimetière de Saint-Georges

Lydia Ernestine Becker (24 February 1827 – 18 July 1890) was a leader in the early British suffrage movement, as well as an amateur scientist with interests in biology and astronomy. She established Manchester as a centre for the suffrage movement and with Richard Pankhurst she arranged for the first woman to vote in a British election and a court case was unsuccessfully brought to exploit the precedent. Becker is also remembered for founding and publishing the Women's Suffrage Journal between 1870 and 1890.

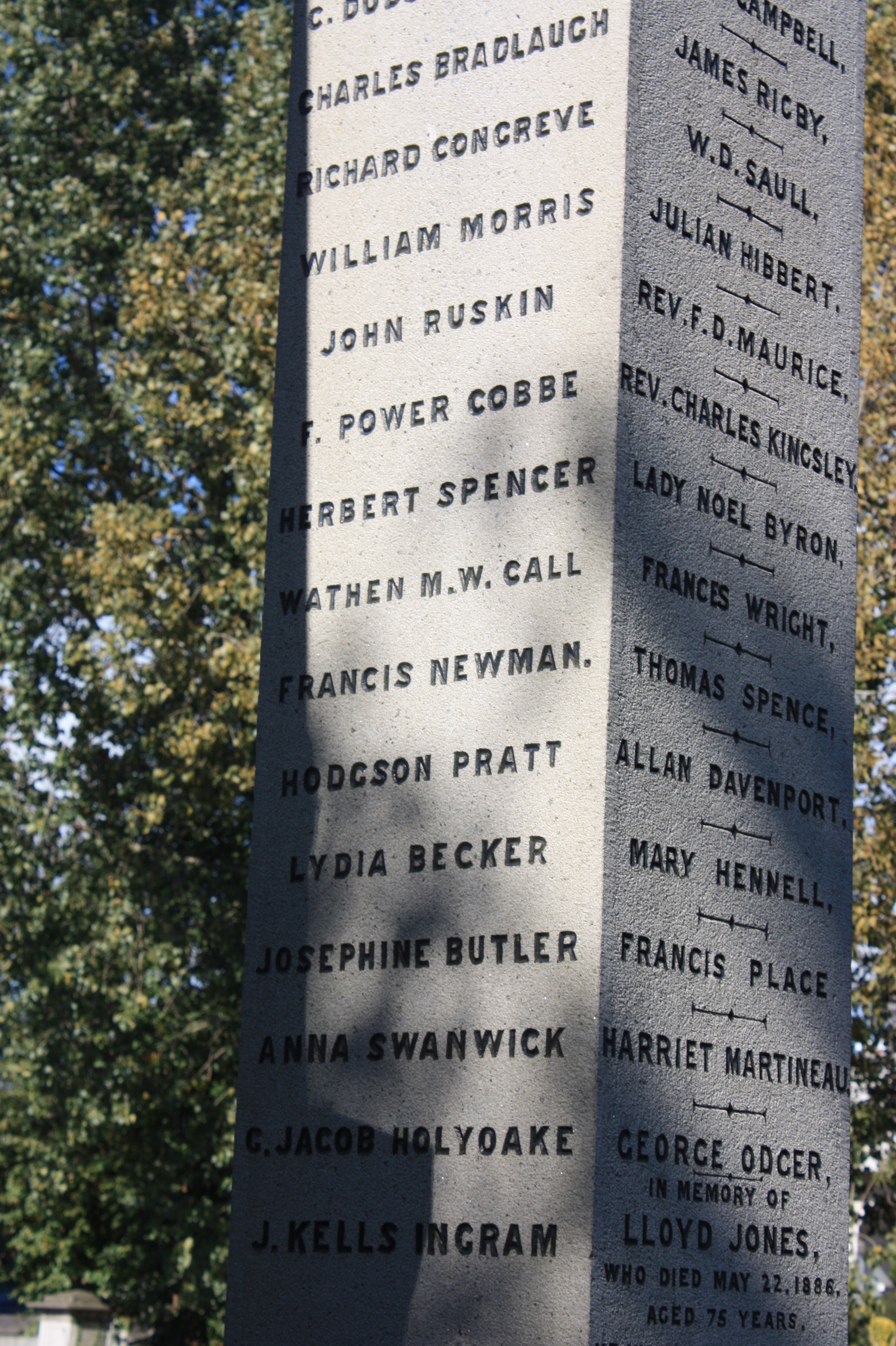
Lydia Becker's name on the lower section of the Reformers memorial, Kensal Green Cemetery

== Biography ==
Lydia Becker was born in Cooper Street in the Deansgate area of Manchester, the oldest daughter of Hannibal Leigh Becker and Mary Becker (née Duncuft).

Her grandfather, Ernst Hannibal Becker had emigrated from Ohrdruf in Thuringia and set up a manufacturing business supplying the cotton industry with dyes and chemicals. Ernest made the family home at Foxdenton Hall in Chadderton, which remained the family seat for 80 years. Her father, Hannibal Leigh Becker, was the eldest son, marrying Mary, daughter of a Hollinwood Mill owner, in 1826, with Lydia being born the following year.

Whilst Hannibal's younger brother, John Leigh, remained resident with his own family at Foxdenton, Hannibal and his wife, Mary built their own new family home, Moorside House, at Altham, near Accrington, in Lancashire. The home was near to the family chemical works there, beside the Leeds and Liverpool Canal.

Moorside House remained Becker's home for a large part of her childhood. The family moved to Reddish for 13 years (1837–50), when her father acquired a calico printing works there but the family returned again to Altham in 1850.

Becker was educated at home, like many girls at the time. Intellectually curious, she studied botany and astronomy from the 1850s onwards, winning a gold medal for an 1862 scholarly paper on horticulture. An uncle, rather than her parents, encouraged this interest.

Whilst at Altham she began a correspondence with Charles Darwin (fourteen of her letters survive in the Darwin archive from 1863 to 1877). In the course of their correspondence, Becker sent a number of plant samples to Darwin from the fields surrounding Altham. She also forwarded Darwin a copy of her "little book", Botany for Novices (1864). Becker is one of a number of 19th-century women who contributed, often routinely, to Darwin's scientific work. Her correspondence and work alike suggest that Becker had a particular interest in bisexual and hermaphroditic plants, which, perhaps, offered her powerful 'natural' evidence of a radical, alternative sexual and social order.

Becker was also recognised for her own scientific contributions, being awarded a national prize in the 1860s for a collection of dried plants prepared using a method that she had devised so that they retained their original colours. She gave a botanical paper to the Biology Section (D) at the 1868 meeting of the British Association about the effect of fungal infection on sexual development in a plant species. The smut fungus Microbotryum silenes-dioicae transforms female flowers into hermaphrodite ones by causing the development of anthers.

Her mother died in 1855, at the age of 47, leaving Lydia Becker, as the eldest child, to become the mother figure in the household for her eleven surviving siblings and father. Economic troubles saw the family move from Altham to 11 Grove Street, Ardwick, in Manchester in 1865, but it was here that Becker found her independence, moving into her own lodgings in 1867 at Carter Street in Greenheys, Manchester, and founding the Ladies' Literary Society in the same year. Although her practical study of flowers had come to an end with the family move to Manchester, her correspondence with Charles Darwin had continued and she persuaded Darwin to send one of his own pamphlets for discussion at the opening meeting of her Society. Her father died in 1877, giving Becker further freedom.

== Role in women's suffrage ==
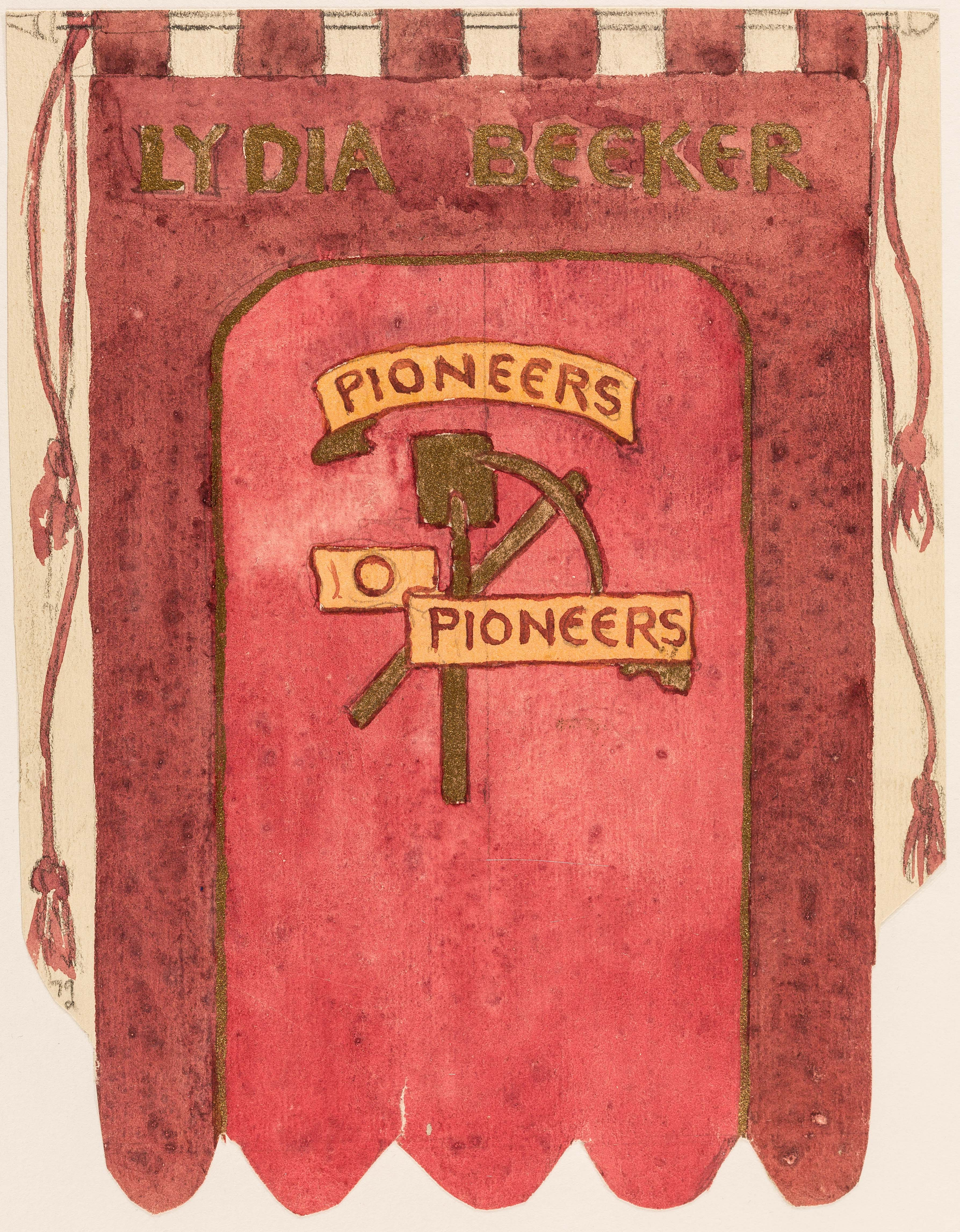
Lydia Becker banner designed by Mary Lowndes (died 1929)

In autumn 1866 Becker attended the annual meeting of the National Association for the Advancement of Social Science, where she was excited by a paper from Barbara Bodichon entitled "Reasons for the Enfranchisement of Women". She dedicated herself to organising around the issue, and in January 1867 convened the first meeting of the Manchester Women's Suffrage Committee, one of the first organisations of its kind in England. She got to know there Dr. Richard Pankhurst, known as 'the red Doctor' whom Becker described as 'a very clever little man with some extraordinary sentiments about life in general and women in particular'. He married Emmeline in 1879.

Several months later, a widowed shop owner, Lilly Maxwell, mistakenly appeared on the register of voters in Manchester. She was not the first but she was a good opportunity for publicity. Becker, the Secretary of the Manchester Society for Women's Suffrage, visited Maxwell and escorted her to the polling station. The returning officer found Maxwell's name on the list and allowed her to vote. Becker immediately began encouraging other women heads of households in the region to petition for their names to appear on the rolls. Their claims were presented in court by Sir John Coleridge and Richard Pankhurst in Chorlton v. Lings, but the case was dismissed.

On 14 April 1868, the first public meeting of the National Society for Women's Suffrage was held in the Free Trade Hall in Manchester. The three main speakers were Agnes Pochin, Anne Robinson and Becker. Becker moved the resolution that women should be granted voting rights on the same terms as men.

Becker subsequently commenced a lecture tour of northern cities on behalf of the society. In June 1869, Becker and fellow campaigners were successful in securing the vote for women in municipal elections. Having campaigned for the inclusion of women on school boards, in 1870 she was one of four women elected to the Manchester School Board on which she served until her death. In the same year Becker and her friend Jessie Boucherett founded the Women's Suffrage Journal and soon afterward began organising speaking tours of women – a rarity in Britain at the time. At an 1874 speaking event in Manchester organised by Becker, fifteen-year-old Emmeline Pankhurst experienced her first public gathering in the name of women's suffrage. On 24 March 1877 Lydia appeared at a public meeting alongside J.W White, Henry Birchenough, Alice Cliff Scatcherd (subsequently one of the co-founders of the Women's Franchise League) and other early suffragists to discuss women's access to the vote in Macclesfield.

The Journal was the most popular publication relating to women's suffrage in 19th-century Britain. Roger Fulford, in his study of the movement Votes for Women: The Story of a Struggle, writes: "The history of the decades from 1860 to 1890 – so far as women's suffrage is concerned – is the history of Miss Becker." The Journal published speeches from around the country, both within and outside of Parliament. Becker published her correspondence with her supporters and her opponents, notably in 1870, when she chastised the MP for Caernarvonshire after he voted against a proposal offering women the vote.

In 1880, Becker and co-workers campaigned in the Isle of Man for the right of women to vote in the House of Keys elections. Unexpectedly, they were successful and they secured for women voting rights in the Isle of Man for the first time in the elections of March 1881. Becker became the chair of the Central Committee of the National Society for Women's Suffrage. This organisation had been formed in 1871 to lobby parliament. Other committee members included Helen Blackburn, Millicent Fawcett, Jessie Boucherett, Eva McLaren, Margaret Bright Lucas, Priscilla Bright McLaren and Frances Power Cobbe.

Becker differed from many early feminists in her disputation of essentialised femininity. Arguing there was no natural difference between the intellect of men and women, Becker was a vocal advocate of a non-gendered education system in Britain. She also differed with many suffrage activists in arguing more strenuously for the voting rights of unmarried women. Women connected to husbands and stable sources of income, Becker believed, were less desperately in need of the vote than widows and single women. This attitude made her the target of frequent ridicule in newspaper commentary and editorial cartoons.

== Death and legacy ==
Ill of health by 1890, Lydia decided upon a rest cure at Bath.

In June she travelled to the French spa town of Aix-les-Bains, for further treatment. Friends by this time were concerned for Lydia's health and her ability to complete the long journey. From there she travelled to Chamonix in the Savoy Alps for a week and arrived at St Gervais Les Bains on 6 July. Ill health continued to take a toll and doctors from Gervais recommended Lydia travel the 40 miles to Geneva to see a specialist. Having deteriorated further, Lydia died in Geneva on 18 July 1890, reportedly of diphtheria, aged 63. She was buried in the Geneva cemetery of St George on 21 July.

She was afterwards commemorated on the family gravestone in the St James churchyard at Altham. Her father had been church warden at St James.

Rather than continue publishing in her absence, the staff of the Women's Suffrage Journal decided to cease production.

== Memorials ==
Becker's name is listed on the Reformers' Memorial in Kensal Green Cemetery in London.

A plaque commemorating her life is situated adjacent to the Moorfield Colliery Memorial on Burnley Road, Altham, (A678) at the junction with Moorfield Way.

A blue plaque commemorating her life has also been placed on Moorside House, Altham where she spent a large portion of her childhood.

Becker's name and image, alongside those of 58 other women's suffrage supporters, are etched on the plinth of the statue of Millicent Fawcett in Parliament Square, London.

In Paris, France, a street is named after her, the allée Lydia-Becker (Lydia Becker Lane), near Montmartre, close to the rue Eva-Kotchever. In Chadderton, Oldham, United Kingdom, a street is named after her, Lydia Becker Way.

== Legacy ==
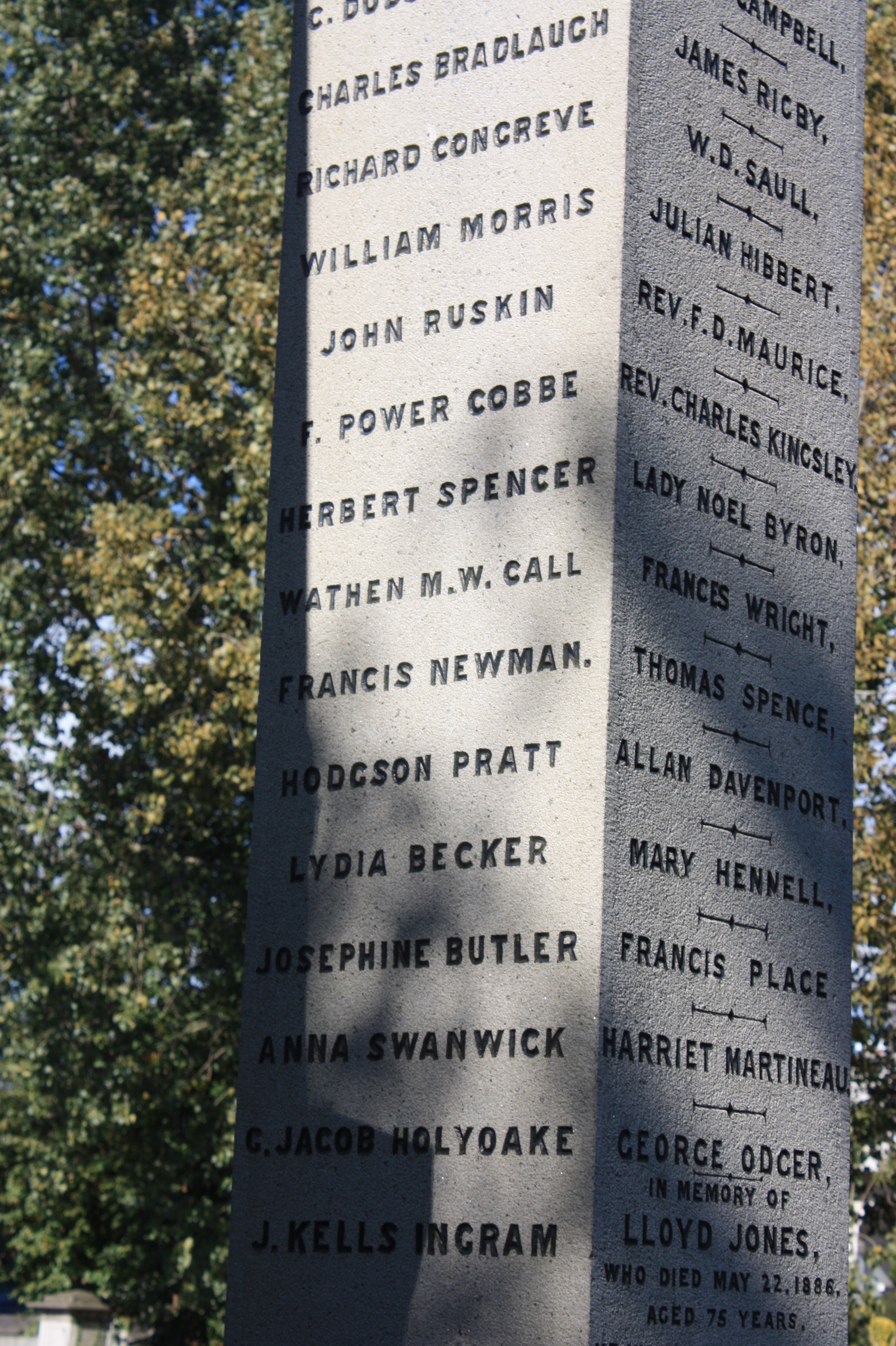
Lower section of the Reformers' memorial in Kensal Green Cemetery, featuring Becker's name

A book collection by women, with books from Helen Blackburn's collection, her friends and from second hand sources, was placed in two bookcases decorated with paintings of Becker and Caroline Ashurst Biggs, who had been chairs of the Central Committee of the National Society for Women's Suffrage before Blackburn. These bookcases were given to Girton College and are extant.

== Works ==
- Botany for Novices (1864)
- "Female Suffrage" in The Contemporary Review (1867)
- "Is there any Specific Distinction between Male and Female Intellect?" in Englishwoman's Review of Social and Industrial Questions (1868)
- "On the Study of Science by Women" in The Contemporary Review (1869)
- About female flowers of red campion producing stamens when infected with a fungus. Journal of Botany volume 7 pages 291 – 292 (1869)
- "The Political Disabilities of Women" in The Westminster Review (1872)

== Archives ==
The archives of Lydia Becker are held at the Women's Library at the Library of the London School of Economics.

== Lydia Becker Institute of Immunology and Inflammation ==
In 2018, the Lydia Becker Institute of Immunology and Inflammation was launched at The University of Manchester.

The institute has internationally recognized research expertise in immunology and inflammation across basic and applied disciplines.

The institute is named after Lydia Becker because she was a celebrated natural scientist who conversed with Charles Darwin and because she strongly believed that women were intellectually equal to men and deserved the same opportunities.
