= Edward Truelove =

English radical publisher and freethinker

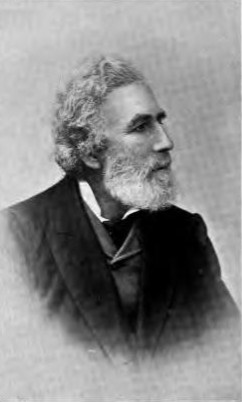
- Edward Truelove
- Born: 29 October 1809
- Died: 21 April 1899 (aged 89)
- Resting place: Highgate Cemetery
- Occupations: Publisher and Bookseller
- Known for: Radical publishing
- Movement: Chartisim and Owenisim
- Board member of: John Street Institution
- Spouse: Harriett Potbory
- Children: Harriett, Maurice H, and Edward Mazaninni
- Parent(s): John and Sara Truelove
- Relatives: Louisa Truelove Baldwin (nee Mosley)- Grand Niece

Edward Truelove (29 October 1809 – 21 April 1899) was an English radical publisher and freethinker.

== Life ==
A long-term Owenite, Truelove spent time from 1844 to 1845 at the Queenwood community in Hampshire. He went to New Harmony, Indiana for a year, returning to London in 1846. He then acted as secretary of the John Street Institution, a Chartist base in London, for nine years. In 1871 he was secretary of the last London festival of Owenites. John Stuart Mill noted in On Liberty that both Truelove and George Jacob Holyoake were rejected as jurymen at the Old Bailey in 1857, for their statements of lack of religious belief.

Truelove edited the Reformer's Library series of cheap works. He acted also as publisher for the International Workingmen's Association. In July 1877 he was one of the founders of the Malthusian League. As were others involved in setting it up, he was also a member of the National Secular Society. He became one of the core members of the League who attended regularly, until it stopped meeting formally around 1899, with Thomas Owen Bonser, J. K. Page and William Hammond Reynolds.

In 1847 Truelove was selling Vestiges of the Natural History of Creation and other works from John Street, London. From 1852 to 1867 he published from 240 Strand, London; in 1874 he was at 256 High Holborn. The High Holborn address was that of the First International office, from about 1870.

The Book-Hunter in London (1895) described Truelove as "agnostic", and as having retired from the High Holborn shop, to which he moved from the Strand, a few years earlier. His personal library was sold after his death, with a catalogue published.

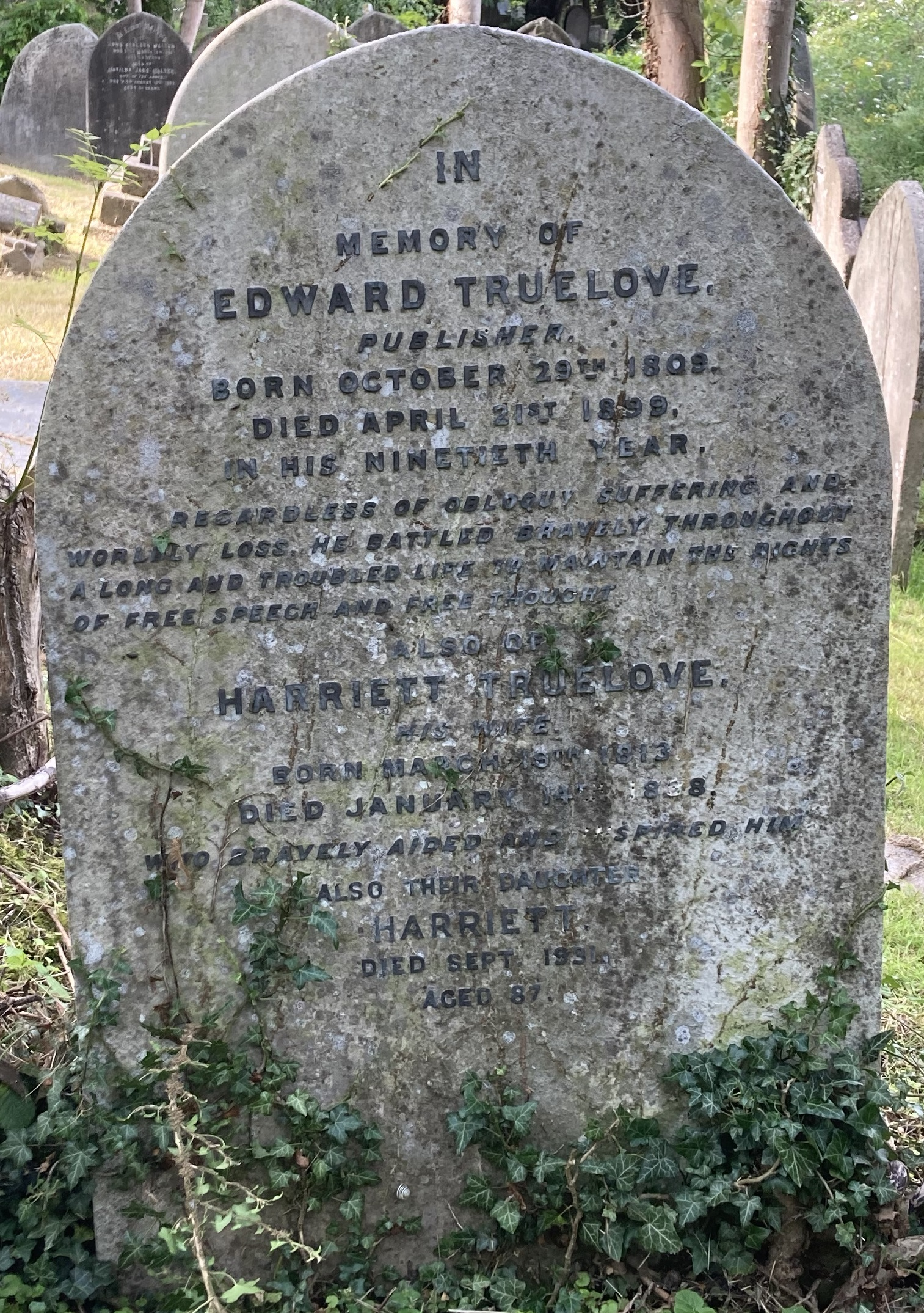
Family grave of Edward Truelove in Highgate Cemetery

He is buried with his wife and daughter on the east side of Highgate Cemetery.

== Prosecutions ==
Truelove encountered legal trouble with both political and birth control publications.

=== Tyrannicide pamphlet ===
In 1858 he was prosecuted in the wake of the Orsini affair, for publishing Tyrannicide: Is it justifiable? by William Edwin Adams. The prosecution was on grounds of seditious libel; a charge of blasphemy was dropped. After six months Truelove was cautioned by the judge, Lord Chief Justice Campbell, and the matter was closed.

=== Obscenity charge ===
In 1878 Truelove was tried for publishing an edition of Robert Dale Owen's work Moral Physiology, and spent four months in Coldbath Fields Prison. Prosecuted in 1877, at the instigation of the Society for the Suppression of Vice, Truelove had his trial postponed to allow the higher-profile contraception case involving Charles Bradlaugh and Annie Besant, and the publication of Charles Knowlton's The Fruits of Philosophy, to come to court first. A first trial of Truelove in February 1878 led to the jury not being able to come to a verdict. He was convicted after a second trial.

In legal terms, prosecutions brought during the 1870s, and prompted by the Society for the Suppression of Vice, turned on the application of the Obscene Publications Act 1857. A series of cases had been sought by Charles Hastings Collette, Secretary of the Society. It became a one-man campaign, ending in 1880 when the Society closed down. Truelove had displayed Moral Physiology in his shop window, in High Holborn. Witnesses for Truelove's defence were John Morrison Davidson and W. A. Hunger of the English Dialectical Society. The judge for the first trial was Lord Chief Justice Cockburn; for the second, Baron Pollock.

==== Publications on contraception ====
The background in birth control was that Truelove had first published George Drysdale's The Elements of Social Science; or Physical, Sexual and Natural Religion, an influential pseudonymous text on contraception, in 1855, after Drysdale had had trouble finding a publisher; he also sold contraceptive devices. The book, cheaply produced, had reached a 14th edition by 1876; in all there were 35 editions, to 1905.

Bradlaugh was accused of writing Drysdale's work; he did not know the true author, and Truelove successfully maintained Drysdale's secret. Drysdale's authorship only came out in 1904, after his death.

Owen's Moral Physiology was an earlier birth control book from 1830, first published in the United States. Under the title Individual, Family, and National Poverty, a pamphlet version of Drysdale's work was part of the case against Truelove.

== Family ==
Truelove married Harriett Potbory, from Sidmouth, Devon, in 1840. Both his wife and daughter, also called Harriett, were later suffragists. They also had a son, Maurice H. and in 1849 it was reported that he had named a young son "Mazzini", after Giuseppe Mazzini; this took place at a secular baptism on 11 November, blessing by George Jacob Holyoake, at the John Street Institution. Later in life Edward, his wife and daughter Harriet are shown to have raised their grand-niece Louisa.

Harriett Truelove was on good terms with Florence Nightingale, and corresponded with her. Nightingale sometimes visited the bookshop in the later 1840s, when it was next to the John Street Institution.
