= Thomas Hodges =

Thomas Hodges may refer to:

== Politicians ==
- Thomas Hodges (MP for Cricklade), member of parliament for Cricklade, 1640
- Thomas Twisden Hodges (1809–1865), MP for Rochester
- Thomas Hodges (Governor of Bombay) (died 1771), Governor of Bombay, 1767–1771
- Thomas Law Hodges (1776–1857), English Liberal Party politician

== Sportspeople ==
- Thomas Hodges (volleyball) (born 1994), Australian male volleyball player
- Tom Hodges (basketball) (born 1982), American college basketball coach
- Tom Hodges (ice hockey) (born 1993), British-American ice hockey goaltender

== Others ==
- Thomas Hodges (artist) (born 1957), photographic artist
- Thomas J. Hodges (1825–1856), western outlaw and physician known as the "Outlaw Doc" and Tom Bell
- Tom Hodges (comics) (born 1972), American comics artist
- Tom Hodges (actor) (born 1965), American actor and film producer

== See also ==
- Thomas Hodge (disambiguation)
