= Women's Suffrage Journal =

Defunct women magazine

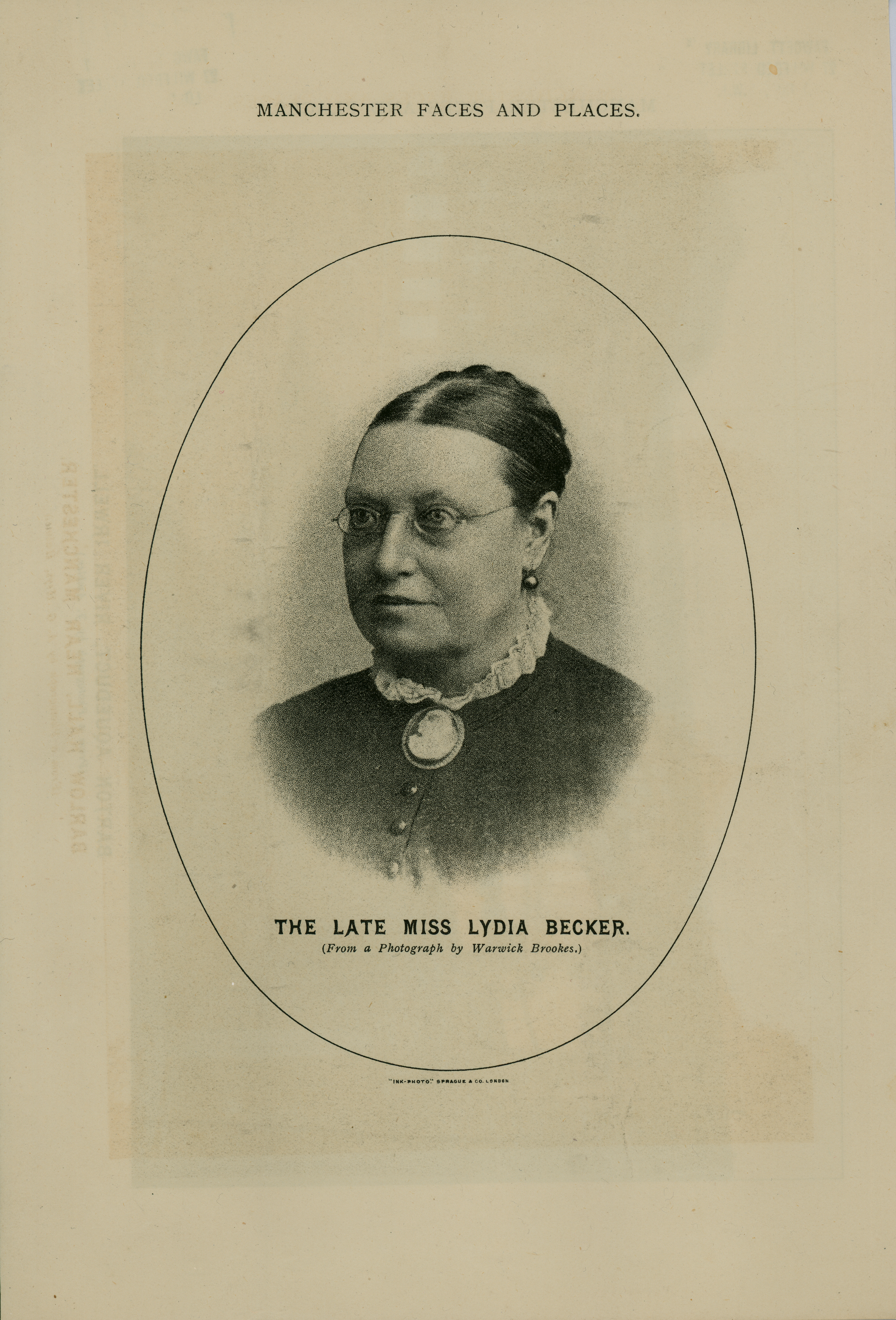
The journal's founder, Lydia Becker

The Women's Suffrage Journal was a magazine founded in England by Lydia Becker and Jessie Boucherett in 1870. It carried news of events affecting all areas of women's lives, and particularly focused on features that demonstrated the breadth of support among the general population for women's suffrage in the United Kingdom. It also frequently published guidance on how to prepare a petition to be presented to the House of Commons.

== History ==
Initially titled the Manchester National Society for Women's Suffrage Journal within a year its title was changed reflecting Becker's desire to extend its influence beyond "Manchester's radical liberal elite".

Publication ceased in 1890 following Becker's death. The final edition contained this note:

For twenty years and four months this Journal has received the impress of one hand and one mind, so that its long row of volumes forms one continuous work, and now when that careful hand is laid low and the energies of that far-seeing mind are carried beyond our mortal ken, it would seem the most fitting course to close these pages where Miss Becker left them.

== See also ==
- List of suffragists and suffragettes
- List of women's rights activists
- Timeline of women's suffrage
- Women's suffrage
