= Emilie Ashurst Venturi =

English translator and activist (1821–1893)

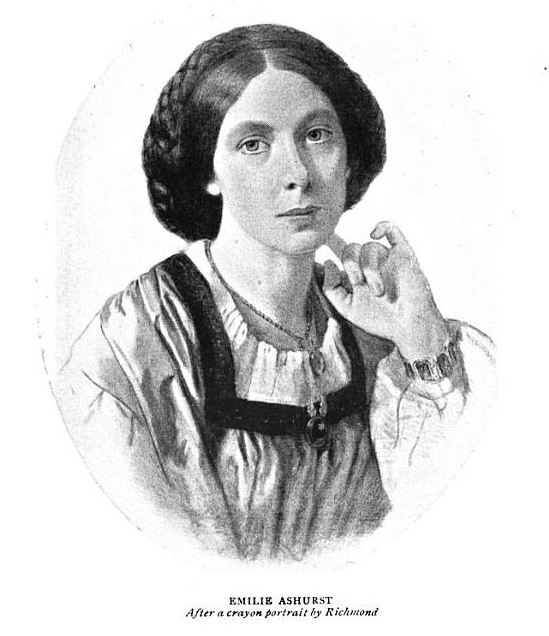
Emilie Ashurst Hawkes Venturi

Emilie Ashurst (Hawkes) Venturi (6 July 1821 – 16 March 1893) was an artist, writer, and activist who pushed for reforms in nineteenth-century Britain. She was the primary English translator of the works of Giuseppe Mazzini, the renowned Italian intellectual, and his devoted disciple. She corresponded with Mazzini, the Italian revolutionary Giuseppe Garibaldi, the artist James McNeill Whistler, the poet Algernon Charles Swinburne, the activist Josephine Butler, and the Irish politician John Dillon. She also painted portraits and published essays, translations, and some fiction. She and her first husband, Sidney Milnes Hawkes (1821–1905), separated in 1854. After her divorce was granted in 1861, she married the Italian patriot Carlo Venturi (c. 1831–1866) and became known as Madame Venturi. Their marriage ended with Carlo's sudden death from a stroke. She also published as E.A.V and Edward Lovel. She belonged to a family, the Ashursts, who agitated for reforms across three generations and were the central figures in the "Muswell Hill Brigade".

== Early life ==
She was the youngest of five surviving children of Elizabeth Ann Brown and William Henry Ashurst. Her father was a prominent solicitor who supported anti-slavery, Chartism, the repeal of the Corn Laws, the creation of the Penny Post, the end of Church Rates, and the unification of Italy. Her mother, Elizabeth Ann Brown, hailed from working-class origins in London. Her siblings were Elizabeth Ann Ashurst Bardonneau-Narcy, who was among the first to translate George Sand’s novels into English; Caroline Ashurst Stansfeld, who developed a close tie with Mazzini and worked for a variety of reform movements with her husband James Stansfeld; Matilda Ashurst Biggs, who was part of the international network of anti-slavery activists and developed a friendship with Ralph Waldo Emerson and William Lloyd Garrison; and William Henry Ashurst, junior, who worked as the solicitor for the Post Office.

== Adult life ==
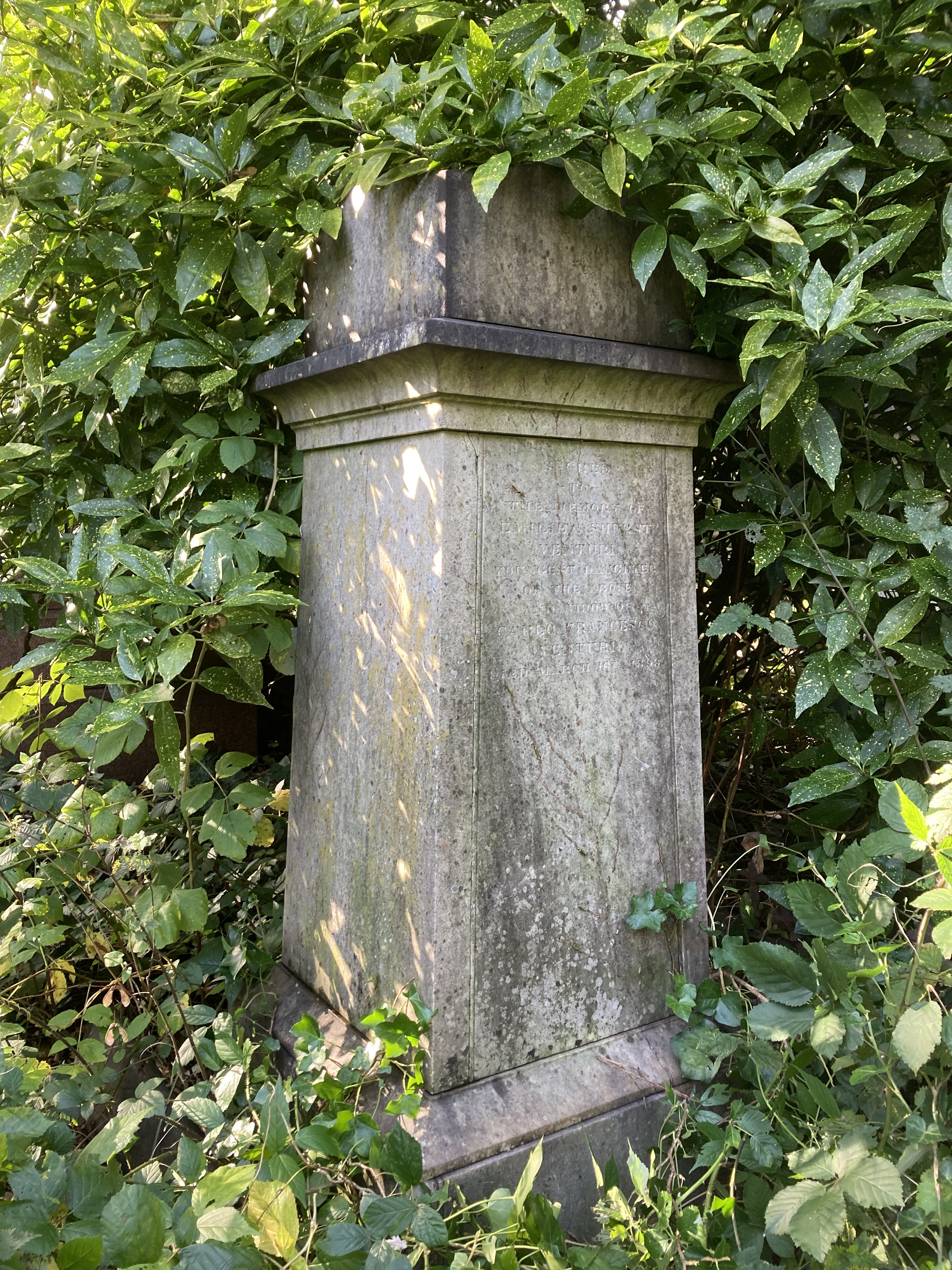
Burial place of Emilie Venturi in the Ashurst family vault in Highgate Cemetery

=== Italian Unification ===
Venturi considered Giuseppe Mazzini as another brother almost from the time he met the Ashursts in 1844, and she worked tirelessly for the cause of Italian unification. She was a fierce advocate for his ideas about freedom and duty and took a lead role in promoting his ideas in England. Her interpretations shaped how his audience understood him and she was an important chronicler of current events. Venturi published six essays about Mazzini’s ideas in addition to three translations of his major works, including The Duties of Man. She also collected about 1500 of his letters to her family for publication in three volumes as Mazzini’s Letters to an English Family. She died before completing the project and handed it off to her friend Elinor Francis Richards. The Ashursts called Mazzini their “Angel” and supported him personally, politically, and financially. Venturi travelled throughout Italy and Switzerland raising money and gathering support for Mazzini.

She was also a passionate advocate for Irish independence. She considered herself the adopted mother of John Dillion and corresponded with him in the last years of her life.

She died on the 16th March 1893 and was buried in the dissenters section of the western side of Highgate Cemetery in the Ashurst family vault.

=== Women’s rights advocacy ===
After Italy was unified, Venturi worked to increase women's independence in society. She served as the editor for the journal of the Ladies National Association for the Repeal of the Contagious Diseases Acts (The Shield) from 1871 to 1886, a cause supported in Parliament by her brother-in-law James Stansfeld. She was on the executive committee for the reform of the married women's property laws and co-wrote (with Josephine Butler and others) a pamphlet arguing their case, The Legislative Restrictions on the Industry of Women considered from the Women’s Point of View (1872).

Venturi and her sisters signed the 1866 petition for women's suffrage presented to Parliament by John Stuart Mill and she joined the Women's Franchise League in 1889. She served on a committee to support the Union side during the American Civil War. She also was a member of the Vigilance Association for the Defense of Personal Rights.

=== Art career ===
In the 1870s Venturi tried her hand at writing fiction. Under a pseudonym, she published a novel (as Edward Lovel, The Owl’s Nest in the City) on a dare from her friend Jane Welsh Carlyle when they argued about whether a woman could write a novel without a sentimental ending. She also published a short story, A Dull Day in a Dull Port on the Mediterranean. But her passion was visual art. She showed portraits at various exhibitions in the early 1850s, including two at the British Institution and a portrait of Arethusa Milner Gibson at the Royal Academy in 1853. Testifying to her cultural stature, her own portrait was shown at the Royal Academy and the South Kensington Museum.

Venturi's illustrations also appeared in print. She took her skill seriously, apprenticing with established artists in London and in Italy. She gave her portrait of Mazzini to his mother as a gift. It still hangs today in Mazzini's house, now the Museo del Risorgimento in Genoa. She also painted portraits of the Cowen family in Newcastle and other political figures such as Alexandre Auguste Ledru-Rollin and Louis (or Lajos) Kossuth.

Later in her life she befriended James McNeill Whistler, her next door neighbor on Cheyne Walk (now Lindsey Row) in Chelsea. She owned several of his works (including “Chelsea in Ice” now held by the Colby Museum of Art) and discussed art with him and his mother in person and through correspondence. It was Venturi who introduced Thomas Carlyle to Whistler who then painted his portrait, Arrangement in Grey and Black No. 2. She was also close with the famous American actress Charlotte Cushman and her lover, the sculptor Emma Stebbins.

== Publications ==
For a complete list, see Ashurst Research

Fiction

- [Anon]. “A Dull Day in a Dull Port on the Mediterranean.” St. Paul’s Magazine 7 (March 1871), 563–580.
- Lovel, Edward. The Owl’s Nest in the City, 1876.

Essays and translations

- Venturi, Emilie Ashurst. “Europe, Its Conditions and Prospects,” Westminster Review, Vol. VIII (1852), pp. 442–68.
- Venturi, Emilie Ashurst. William Henry Ashurst: A Brief Record of his Life. Privately printed [1855].
- Venturi, Emilie Ashurst. “States of Parties in Italy since 1848,” Westminster Review, Vol. XVII (1857), pp. 98–133.
- Mazzini, Giuseppe, and Emilie Ashurst Venturi. The Duties of Man. London: Chapman & Hall,

1862.

- Venturi, Emilie Ashurst. Joseph Mazzini: A Memoir. London: Henry S. King & Co., 1875.
- [Anon]. “The True Story of Mrs. Shakespeare’s Life.” Gentlemen’s Magazine 228

(Dec 1869), 63–73.

- Venturi, Emilie A. “Answer to Mr. [John] Morley’s Short Letter” Fortnightly Review May 1870, 683.
- A. E. V. [Venturi, Emilie A.] “Joseph Mazzini: What has he done for Italy?” Contemporary Review 15 (Oct 1870), 383–407.
- Venturi, Emilie A. “Religious Republicanism: Joseph Mazzini as Religious Teacher,” Contemporary Review 18 (Sept 1871), 189–211.
- Venturi, Emilie Ashurst, and Giuseppe Mazzini. Joseph Mazzini: His Life, Writing, and Political Principles. New York City: Hurd and Houghton, 1872.
- Butler, Josephine, Ada Smith, Elizabeth C. Wolstenholme, Dinah Goodall, and Emilie A. Venturi. The Legislative Restrictions on the Industry of Women considered from the Women’s Point of View [1872].
- Venturi, Emilie Ashurst. Religious Republicanism: Joseph Mazzini As a Religious Teacher. Bath [England]: Wilkinson Bros, 1871.
- Mazzini, Joseph. “Mazzini on the Eastern Question.” Emilie A. Venturi, translator. With Introductory note by James Stansfeld. Fortnightly Review 21 (April 1877), 559–579.
- Guyot, Yves. English and French Morality, from a Frenchman’s Point of View. Trans by E. A. Venturi. National Liberal Club. London: Henry Vickers, 1886.
- Venturi, Emilie Ashurst. Mazzini's Foreshadowings of the Coming Faith. London: Theosophical Publishing Society, 1916.

Edited works

- Richards, E.F., ed. Mazzini’s Letters to an English Family, 3 vols. London: John Lane, 1920–23.
