= Caroline Ashurst Stansfeld =

English Radical and activist (1816–1885)

Caroline Stansfeld
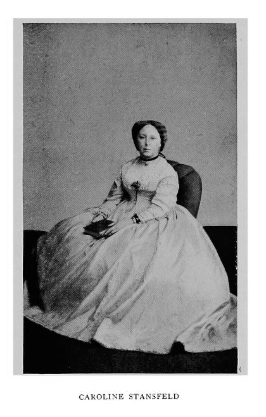
- Portrait of Caroline Ashurst Stansfeld
- Born: 28 January 1816; London, England
- Died: 29 March 1885 (aged 69); London, England
- Occupation: Activist
- Spouse: Sir James Stansfeld (m. 1844)
- Children: Joseph James Stansfeld
- Relatives: William Ashurst (father); Eliza Ann Ashurst Bardonneau (sister); Matilda Ashurst Biggs (sister); Emilie Ashurst Venturi (sister)

Caroline Ashurst Stansfeld (/ˈstænsfiːld/ STANSS-feeld; 28 January 1816 – 29 March 1885) was a member of an important family of radical activists in mid-nineteenth-century England who supported causes ranging from women's suffrage to Italian unification. In 1844, she married James Stansfeld (1820–1898), the future MP for Halifax and preeminent political advocate for the movement to repeal the Contagious Diseases Acts. She maintained a close friendship with Italian nationalist Giuseppe Mazzini, who wrote to her frequently and 1,500 of his letters to the family have been published in E.F. Richards’ collection: Letters to an English Family.

== Personal life ==
In London, on 28 January 1816, Caroline Ashurst was born to Elizabeth Brown and William Ashurst. Her siblings were William Henry Ashurst, Eliza Ann Ashurst (Bardonneau), Emilie Ashurst (Venturi) and Matilda Ashurst (Biggs). She grew up in the Ashurst home in Muswell Hill.

The daughters were brought up in Muswell Hill, London, in a community of 19th-century reformers and free thinkers who advocated for more equality in society including anti-slavery. Her father gave his daughters freedom "considered shocking" for those times.

Caroline and James Stansfeld (1820–1898) were married in Finsbury at the South Place Chapel, on 27 July 1844, by William Johnson Fox. Although trained as a lawyer, Stansfeld worked as a brewer, owning the Swan Brewery. In 1859 Stansfeld entered Parliament, when he advocated for the repeal of the Contagious Diseases Acts.

On 19 April 1852, the couple had a son, Joseph James Stansfeld, named after Giuseppe Mazzini. Mazzini considered him a godson, sending letters and books from abroad.

== Activism ==
Like her sisters and her husband, Caroline Stansfeld was active in the feminist movement from its beginnings in the 1840s. She sat on the Whittington Club's executive council for equal adult education, worked to reform prostitution laws through the Associate Institution, worked to repeal the Contagious Diseases Act, and worked closely with radical Clementia Taylor. She was actively involved in the London Society for Women's Suffrage between 1867 and 1883. She supported abolitionism and the side of the Union in the US Civil War.

Stansfeld had a close relationship with Giuseppe Mazzini, the Italian revolutionary and republican. She considered him another brother almost from the time he met the Ashurst in 1844. She and her husband were members and she was a fundraiser of the Society of the Friends of Italy, supporting the unification of Italy. Mazzini "referred to Caroline as ‘his ministering angel’: she assisted him in a variety of capacities, helping not only with his personal and domestic affairs but aiding him with his literary work, as well as becoming involved in more dangerous activities, such as securing money and documents for Italian revolutionaries and providing secret places of refuge for them." In 1864, James Stansfeld was implicated in a plot to assassinate Napoleon III and had to leave his government post.

Caroline Stansfeld also served on committees for the Ladies’ London Emancipation and the St Mary's Dispensary for Women and Children. In 1871 she served on the executive committee of the National Society for Women's Suffrage. At the Isle of Wight and in London she and her husband ran a salon frequented by Giuseppe Mazzini, Richard Cobden, Eugene Oswald, Malvida Mesenbug, Mathilde Blind, Moncure Conway, and "so many bright personalities."

== Later years ==
Stanfeld's physical and mental health declined starting in 1881. She died on 29 March 1885 of a cerebral haemorrhage in her home, Stoke Lodge, Hyde Park Gate, London. She is buried at St. Denys Church in Rotherfield.
