= Thomas Hodge (Garibaldian) =

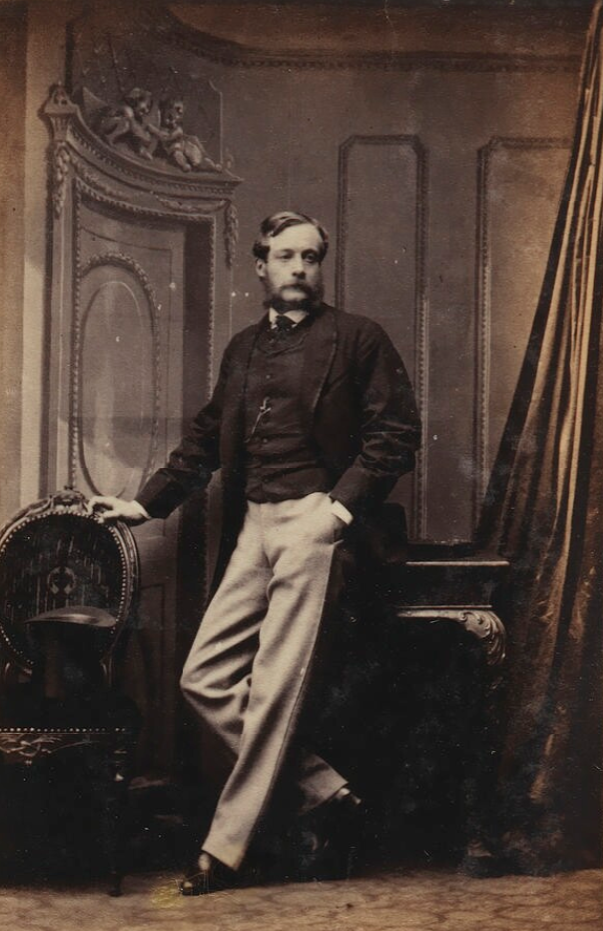
Thomas Durell Powell Hodge, 1863 photograph

Thomas Durell Powell Hodge (known also as T. Durell Hodge and Durrell Hodge; 1835–1888) was an English supporter of Giuseppe Garibaldi, implicated in the Orsini affair of 1858. In later life he was called to the bar and changed his name to Thomas Durell Blake.

== Early life ==
He was the only son of Thomas Stoke Hodge (or Stokes, from 1834 marriage register entry), a surgeon at one time in Sidmouth, and his wife Anne Durell Blake, daughter of John Blake of Belmont, County Galway. He had a prosperous family background in Glastonbury, and was educated at Charterhouse School from 1851 to 1853. His father died in 1854, at age 45, shortly after a second marriage.

== Garibaldian ==
After leaving school, Hodge joined Garibaldi's army. As a supporter of a republican and Independent Italy, he was active in financing Garibaldi's campaign, He took part in the unified Central Committee of the Garibaldi Fund, that brought together radicals such as George Holyoake and Joseph Cowen with moderate Garibaldians. He became disillusioned with the nationalist leader Giuseppe Mazzini, however, troubled by the internal conflicts in which Mazzini became involved, particularly the clash with Daniele Manin.

== Orsini plot and aftermath ==
After meeting Felice Orsini, Hodge struck up a friendship with him. In the Appendix to Orsini's memoirs, written for the second edition by Ausonio Franchi, it is stated that Orsini met Hodge, who was travelling in France, in early 1857: he came with an introduction in the form of a letter from Simon François Bernard to a supporter, Outrequin. Hodge was using an assumed name. Orsini and Hodge planned to oppose Mazzini's newspaper Italia del Popolo, using Franchi's La Ragione published in Turin as their vehicle.

Joseph McCabe's account of Orsini's plot to assassinate Napoleon III states that Hodge knew the details of the plot and was active in it. He notes that George Holyoake's own relation of the plot is self-exculpatory: but points to Hodge, in the West Country, as being one of the inner circle of six people who knew about it.

After his failed attempt on the life of Napoleon III in Paris in January 1858, Orsini was arrested, tried and sentenced to execution. His expressed wish, of March 1858, was that Hodge should be the guardian of his elder daughter Ernestina (born 1852); his other daughter Ida (born 1853) he wished to be taken by Peter Stuart of Liverpool. From the La Roquette Prisons where he was held, he nominated as his executor, on 10 March, Henri Cernuschi, whom he knew as a colleague in the assembly of the Roman Republic (1849).

Meanwhile, on 26 February 1858, Camillo Cavour wrote to James Hudson that Hodge had been arrested at Genoa, and papers with him were incriminating evidence of his association with the Orsini plot. France then pressed the Kingdom of Sardinia to extradite Hodge. Edward Horsman asked a parliamentary question on the matter. The British government resisted the extradition attempt, and eventually Hudson was able to secure British protection for Hodge.

Ultimately Hodge did not take charge of Ernestina Orsini. Cernuschi was not able to overcome the objections of Assunta Orsini, widow of Felice, to an English upbringing for her daughters; she also did not want them educated in Paris. Ernestina went to Italy, to live with Leonida Orsini, Felice's brother. Her sister Ida died young, by August 1858 according to Leti.

== Further activism ==
On 1 December 1859, Hodge attended an evening given for John Bright by the Liverpool Financial Reform Association. In 1860, he organised a Garibaldi Demonstration on 22 May in London's St Martin's Hall. The speakers included Henry James Slack. At the meeting Hodge was appointed secretary to the funding committee. Other members were Slack, George Holyoake and Alfred Bate Richards.

In September of that year, Hodge gave £1000 to Garibaldi funds, signed "friend of Orsini" from Great Portland Street. This was actually a loan to the committee. McCabe comments that Hodge said much more than was safe, from the point of view of gaining attention, in attributing the donation in a letter to "a member of the old firm of January 14th", the date of the Orsini bomb attack.

== Later life ==
In 1863, Hodge entered Lincoln's Inn; and in 1866 he was called to the bar. That year, he changed his surname to Blake. He joined the West Kent Militia, retiring in 1887 with the rank of Major.
