= The Englishwoman's Review =

Defunct British feminist periodical

English Woman's Journal
- Founding editor: Jessie Boucherett
- Editor: Caroline Ashurst Biggs
- Editor: Helen Blackburn
- Editor: Antoinette Mackenzie
- Editor: Maude Ashurst Biggs
- Categories: Feminist
- Format: Periodical
- Founded: 1866
- First issue: 1866; 160 years ago
- Final issue: 1910; 116 years ago
- Country: England
- Language: English
- ISSN: 1754-6273

The Englishwoman's Review was a feminist periodical published in England between 1866 and 1910.

Until 1869 called in full The Englishwoman's Review: a journal of woman's work, in 1870 (after a break in publication) it was renamed The Englishwoman's Review of Social and Industrial Questions.

One of the first feminist journals, The Englishwoman's Review was a product of the early women's movement. Its first editor was Jessie Boucherett, who saw it as the successor to the English Woman's Journal (1858–64). Subsequent editors were Caroline Ashurst Biggs, Helen Blackburn, and Antoinette Mackenzie.

== Contributors ==
Notable contributors include:

- Amelia Sarah Levetus
- Mary Lowndes
- Lady Margaret Sackville
- Ethel Rolt Wheeler
