= Helen Blackburn =

- Born: 25 May 1842; Knightstown, Valentia Island, Co. Kerry, Ireland
- Died: 11 January 1903 (aged 60); Westminster, London, England
- Burial place: Brompton Cemetery, London, England
- Education: University College London
- Occupations: writer and campaigner for women's rights
- Employer: The Englishwoman's Review
- Organization(s): Women's Employment Defence League; National Society for Women's Suffrage; West of England Suffrage Society

Helen Blackburn (25 May 1842 – 11 January 1903) was a feminist, writer and campaigner for women's rights, especially in the field of employment. Blackburn was an editor of the Englishwoman's Review magazine. She wrote books about women workers and a history of the women's suffrage movement in Britain and Ireland which became the "standard work". She served as secretary of the National Society for Women's Suffrage and the West of England Suffrage Society, and co-founded the Freedom of Labour Defence League. Her name appears on the plinth of the Millicent Fawcett statue in Parliament Square.

== Early life ==
Blackburn was born in Knightstown, Valentia Island, County Kerry, Ireland on 25 May 1842. Her parents were Bewicke Blackburn, a civil engineer who managed the slate quarries on Valentia, of County Kerry, and Isabella Lamb of Co. Durham. Her family moved to London in 1859.

== Activism ==
In London, Blackburn came into contact with the women of the Langham Place Group, especially Jessie Boucherett and Emily Faithfull. Over the years Blackburn and Boucherett worked together on a number of endeavours. Both were editors of the Englishwoman's Review (Blackburn, editor, 1880–90; joint editor, 1890–95). Together they established the Women's Employment Defence League in 1891, to defend women's working rights against restrictive employment legislation. They also together edited The Condition of Working Women and the Factory Acts, 1896.

Blackburn joined the National Society for Women's Suffrage in 1872 and was secretary of the executive committee of the society from 1874 to 1880. She subsequently held similar positions in a number of related organisations. In 1880 Blackburn was secretary of the West of England Suffrage Society in Bristol and was the main organizer of a large demonstration. She edited the Women's Suffrage Calendar in 1896 and 1897.

Blackburn also took opportunities to study, first in 1875, taking a class in Roman Law at University College London, and later (1886–88) classes at University College, Bristol. In the early 1890s, she assisted Charlotte Carmichael Stopes in her writing of British Freewomen: Their Historical Privilege by supplying her own notes on the subject, then by purchasing the whole of the first edition in 1894. She scaled down her work in 1895 to care for her aged father until his death, then resumed her work.

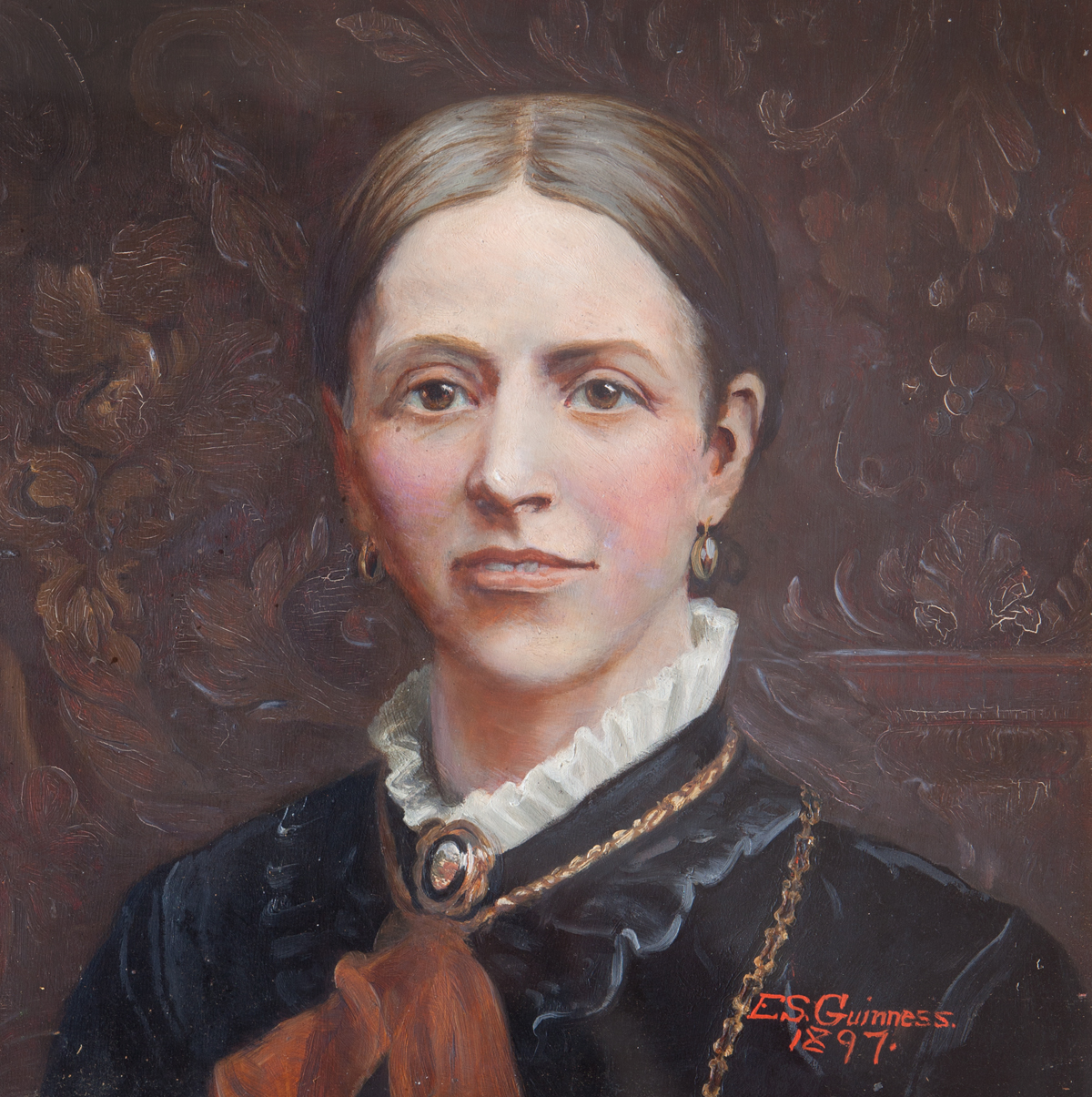
Portrait of Caroline Ashurst Biggs by Elizabeth Sarah Guinness associated with the bookcases now at Girton College

Blackburn inspired and funded two collections. The first was an art collection in 1885 that included pictures and work done by professional women to show the result of women's industry. She was insistent that this would not include voluntary or amateurish work but it would show the products of female professionals. The Loan Exhibition of Women's Industries included portraits of leading women like Florence Nightingale and Mary Carpenter. This was donated to Bristol University, but recent enquiries indicate that this work is now lost. Her second collection was focused on a book collection by women. The books were from her collection, friends and from second hand sources. Bookplates were commissioned and two bookcases. The bookcases were decorated with paintings of Lydia Becker and Caroline Ashurst Biggs who had been the previous chairs of the Central Committee of the National Society for Women's Suffrage. These bookcases were given to Girton College and are extant.

Her long term connection with the women's movement allowed her to write her history of the Victorian women's suffrage campaign, Women's suffrage: a record of the women's suffrage movement in the British Isles, with biographical sketches of Miss Becker, finished in 1902. The book provided an account of the movement's formative years and her colleague Lydia Becker but makes few mentions of Blackburn's own contribution. She had previously edited Becker's writings in a collection called Words of a Leader (1897).

In 1903, in collaboration with Nora Vynne, she created the book Women under the Factory Act. In the book they criticised legislators for treating women as if they had not the intelligence of animals and as if they always needed to be cared for or protected. She and Vynne argued that women should be allowed to take risks with their health in the workplace or they may find themselves always in need to protection as if they were incapable. The book was noted for its accuracy, but the Economic Journal recognised its authors as Freedom of Labour Defence members and suspected that it may have political motives arguing for the "equality of men and women".

== Death and legacy ==
Blackburn died aged 60 at her home in Greycoat Gardens, Westminster, London on 11 January 1903 and was buried at Brompton Cemetery in London. She left her archives, and the decorated book collection, to Girton College, Cambridge. Her will also made provisions for establishing a loan fund for training young women.

Her name and picture (and those of 58 other women's suffrage supporters) are on the plinth of the statue of Millicent Fawcett in Parliament Square, London, unveiled in 2018.

== Works ==
Blackburn's books include:

- A Handbook for Women Engaged in Social and Political Work, 1881.
- A Handy Book of Reference for Irishwomen, 1888.
- The Condition of Working Women and the Factory Acts, editor with Jessie Boucherett, 1896.
- Women under the Factory Acts, written with Nora Vynne, 1903.
- Women's suffrage: a record of the women's suffrage movement in the British Isles, with biographical sketches of Miss Becker, 1902.
