= Eliza Ashurst Bardonneau =

English translator and activist (1813-1850)

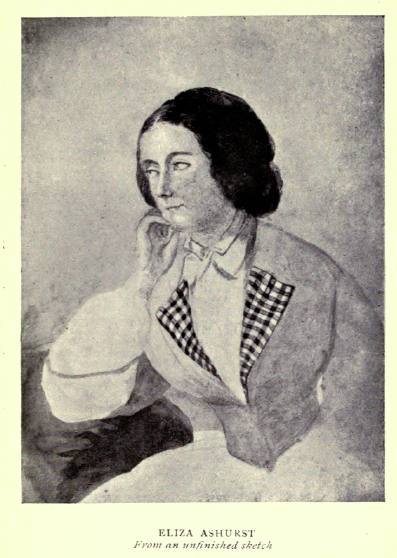
- Born: Elizabeth Ann Ashurst; 8 July 1813
- Died: 25 November 1850 (aged 37); Paris, France
- Burial place: Highgate Cemetery, London, England
- Known for: first translator of George Sand's work into English
- Spouse: Jean Bardonneau Narcy (m. 1849)
- Parents: William Henry Ashurst (father); Elizabeth Ann Brown (mother)
- Relatives: William Henry Ashurst Jr. (brother); Caroline Ashurst Stansfeld (sister); Emilie Ashurst Venturi (sister); Matilda Ashurst Biggs (sister)

Eliza Ashurst Bardonneau (born Elizabeth Ann Ashurst; 8 July 1813 – 25 November 1850) was a member of an important family of radical activists in mid-nineteenth-century England and the first translator of George Sand's work into English. The family supported causes ranging from women's suffrage to Italian unification.

== Early life ==
On 8 July 1813, Elizabeth Ann Ashurst was born to Elizabeth Ann Brown and William Henry Ashurst. She was the oldest child. Her siblings were William Henry Ashurst Jr., Caroline Ashurst (Stansfeld), Emilie Ashurst (Venturi) and Matilda Ashurst (Biggs). She grew up in the Ashurst home in Muswell Hill, London.

== George Sand translations ==
Ashurst and the Italian revolutionary Giuseppe Mazzini met and began corresponding in 1844. She sent him a translation of The Mosaic Workers by George Sand. Mazzini responded that he liked it and suggested that she also translate a work of Sand's he admired, Letter of a Traveller. He was already a correspondent of Sand.

At a period in time when George Sand's advocacy of free-love and her independent lifestyle were quite unusual for a 19th-century woman, Elizabeth Ashurst and Matilda Hays were "broad-minded" and intrigued by the political and social messages addressed in Sand's books. Hays had received support and encouragement from William Charles Macready and George Henry Lewes to translate Sand's novels into English. Both wrote to Sand encouraging the arrangement and a friend of Hays, chaplain Edmund Larken provided funding for the enterprise.

The initial translations of Sand's works were done by Hays and Ashurst. La Derniere Aldini, the first volume, was translated by Hays. Ashurst translated Les Maitres mosaistes (published as The Mosaic Workers in 1844) and Andre (published in 1847). Mazzini wrote a preface for Ashurst's translation of Lettres d'un voyageur (published in 1847). Sand, at Mazzini's urging, invited Ashurt to her home in Nohant. Although they developed a lasting friendship, Sand was quite critical of Ashurst's personality and worldview. Olive Class reported that "Sand was unsettled by the superficial display of feminist rebellion exhibited by her as yet still unmarried disciple and characterized her as 'a prude without modesty.'"

George Henry Lewes suggested to Hays that the translation to the English language toned down some of the rhetoric with an English cultural sensibility. Mazzini, aware of Lewes suggestion to Hays, wrote to Sand, referring to Hays: "My friends and I consider it unthinkable that you would be willing to give such license to someone whose ideas are unknown to you."

Ashurst and Hays translated six volumes of Sand's work, but they floundered. In attempting to tone down Sand's ideas, the translated books were "stripped it of its power", according to Giuseppe Mazzini. The translations were "a smuggler's attempt to conceal the real nature of his infamous cargo," reported the Quarterly Review.

Ashurst blamed the "bad business publisher" for the failure.

=== Published translations ===
Ashurst translated the following books:

- Sand, George. Letters of a Traveller. Transl. by Eliza A. Ashurst. Ed. by Matilda M. Hays. [Introduction by J. Mazzini]. London: Churton, 1847.
- Sand, George. Spiridion. Transl. Eliza A. Ashurst. Ed. by Matilda M. Hays. London: Churton, 1842.
- Sand, George, and Eliza A. Ashurst. The Mosaic Workers: A Tale, to Which Is Added The Orco: a Tradition. London: H.G. Clarke, 1844.
- Sand, George. The Works of George Sand. By Matilda M. Hays. [Translated by Matilda M. Hays, Eliza A. Ashurst, and E. R. Larken.]. 1847.
- Sand, George. Andre'. Transl. Eliza A. Ashurst, Ed. by Matilda M. Hays. London: Churton, 1847.

== Personal life ==
Eliza Ashurst was a dear friend of the Italian nationalist Giuseppe Mazzini until her early death. Mazzini and the Ashurst family grew close, and Mazzini considered himself part of the Ashurst family, calling the Ashurst daughters "sister". Eliza, though, may have wished to have been more than a loving sister. (Note: Mazzini had close relationships with several women who may have wanted a romantic relationship by the feeling was not recipicated: "...some (women), like Eliza Ashurst and Kate Craufurd, may have aspired to be more than loving friends, and there was considerable competition, resentment and even hostility among the women in Mazzini's British circles – to translate his works, to be his prime caregiver, his most cherished acolyte, to be present at his death bed. It was his self-fashioning as asexual sacrificial martyr that provided protective armour for both Mazzini and the women. He was untouchable, and if the roles of wife or lover were closed to women, they could become the brides of Christ.") His letters to her are reprinted in E. F. Richards' collection: Mazzini's Letters to an English Family.

In 1840 she, her sister Matilda, and her father attended the World Anti-Slavery Convention in London although she would not have been permitted to speak as the women were not regarded as full delegates.

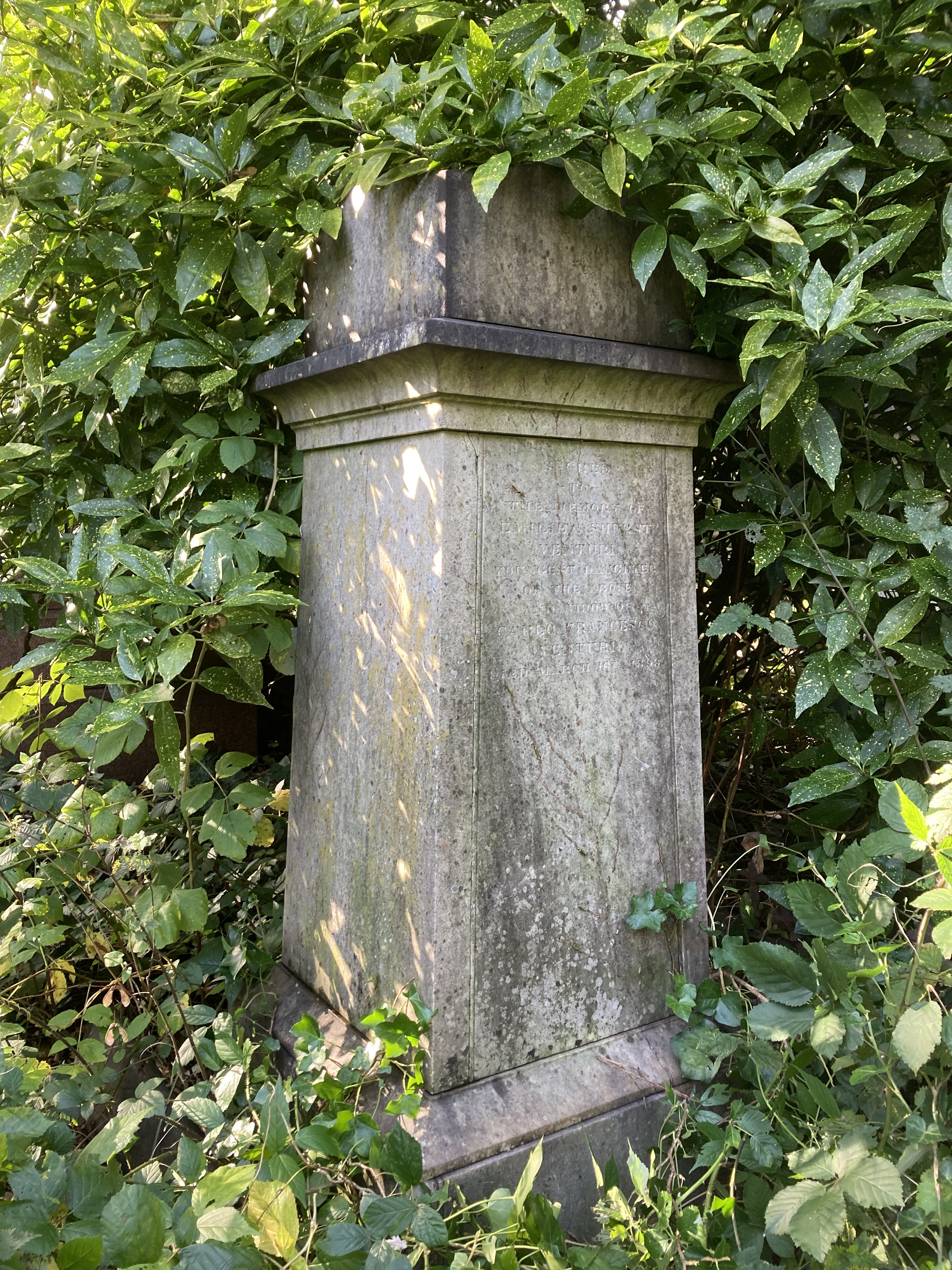
Ashurst family vault in Highgate Cemetery

She met Jean Bardonneau Narcy, a French National Guardsman, in Paris in 1848. They married in Britain in early 1849. Her family and friends, including Mazzini and Sand, opposed the match because they felt he was beneath her in intellect and he had few job prospects. While living in Paris, she miscarried and later died in childbirth on 25 November 1850.

It was Mazzini who relayed the sad news to her sisters, Emilie Ashurst Hawkes (later Venturi) and Matilda Ashurst Biggs, who were in Genoa at the time. Her brother William Henry Ashurst, Jr. and sister Caroline were en route to Paris to attend to her, but Elizabeth died before they made it to Paris. While in Paris they were very unhappy about the burial and burial place for their sister. They later had her body sent back to England for burial in the Highgate Cemetery, where they had a family vault. The Ashurst family suffered dearly from her death and the radical movement lost an important advocate. (Note: Mazzini refers to the ill-fated marriage in his letters to the family, In 1853 and 1854, Mazzini wrote to Bardonneau (who was in London) trying to convince him to board a ship to leave England.)
