= William Henry Ashurst (solicitor) =

English solicitor (1792-1855)

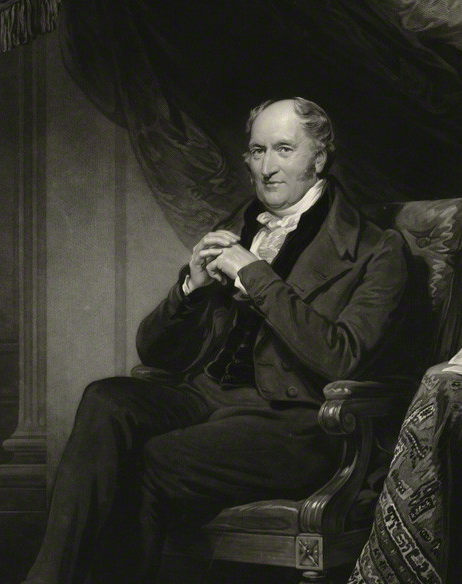
- William Henry Ashurst by Thomas Goff Lupton, after Henry Perronet Briggs (1843)
- Born: 11 February 1792; London, England
- Died: 13 October 1855 (aged 63)
- Resting place: Highgate Cemetery, London, England
- Occupation: Solicitor
- Spouse: Elizabeth Ann Brown (m. 1812)
- Children: 5
- Relatives: Caroline Ashurst (daughter); Elizabeth Ashurst (daughter); Matilda Ashurst (daughter); Emilie Ashurst (daughter)

William Henry Ashurst (1792–1855) was an English solicitor, deeply involved in the radical politics of his time.

== Life ==
Ashurst was born in London 11 February 1792. His father had led an aimless existence, under the impression — due to rumours about his infancy and his likeness to the eminent judge of the name — that he would be some day recognised as belonging to a distinguished family. After some education at a dame school he entered a solicitor's office, and earned his articles. He gained a practice as a solicitor, and married at the age of nineteen (so that he moonlighted also).

Ashurst belonged to a small sect, the 'Freethinking Christians.' He ceased to be a member of any sect, though he regarded his political principles as the logical outcome of the doctrine of human brotherhood. He was much influenced by the political writings of Paine and Franklin. He was an enthusiastic radical, spending both money and labour to advance the cause. His house was one of the first to announce on its walls that it would pay no taxes till the Reform Bill (of 1832) was passed. He was an active member of the common council, and, as under-sheriff for one year, witnessed an execution, which intensified his horror of capital punishment. He took an active part in the agitation against church rates. He refused to pay them himself. He also conducted the well-known Braintree case to a successful result.

In 1840 he attended the World Anti-Slavery Convention in 1840 with his daughters Matilda and Elizabeth. Whilst he was at the conference he had talks with William Lloyd Garrison. Ashurst made contributions towards Garrison's newspaper under a nom de plume.

Ashurst supported the gathering of evidence in favour of Rowland Hill's scheme of postal reform, when it was before the parliamentary committee. He was a supporter of the co-operative movement, and for a time carried on the Spirit of the Age, founded under Robert Owen's influence, till he disapproved of the spirit in which it was written. The friendship with Owen remained unbroken. Ashurst defended many men whom he believed to have been the victims of injustice or oppression, amongst others George Jacob Holyoake on his imprisonment in 1842.

He was an outspoken advocate of the political and social equality of the sexes. He brought up his daughters in habits of independent thought and action. When asked why he had taken up the cause of women's rights, he would say that he had seen a girl tried for child-murder, who had been betrayed by a man, was convicted by men, sentenced by a man, and hanged by a man. 'It made me think.' The cause represented his strongest convictions.

The opening of Giuseppe Mazzini's letters in 1844 led to a friendship with Ashurst. In 1851 and 1852 Ashurst was a founder of the society of the 'Friends of Italy' and of the 'People's International League.' He welcomed many of the refugees at that time. He was a warm admirer of American institutions and of the principles of the Declaration of Independence. He had long been a friend of Garrison, Lucretia Mott, and other abolitionists. He paid a visit to America, and saw Garrison in his home. His health suffered from the journey, and broke down completely on the death of his wife soon after.

He died on 13 October 1855 and was buried in a family vault in the dissenters section of the western side of Highgate Cemetery.

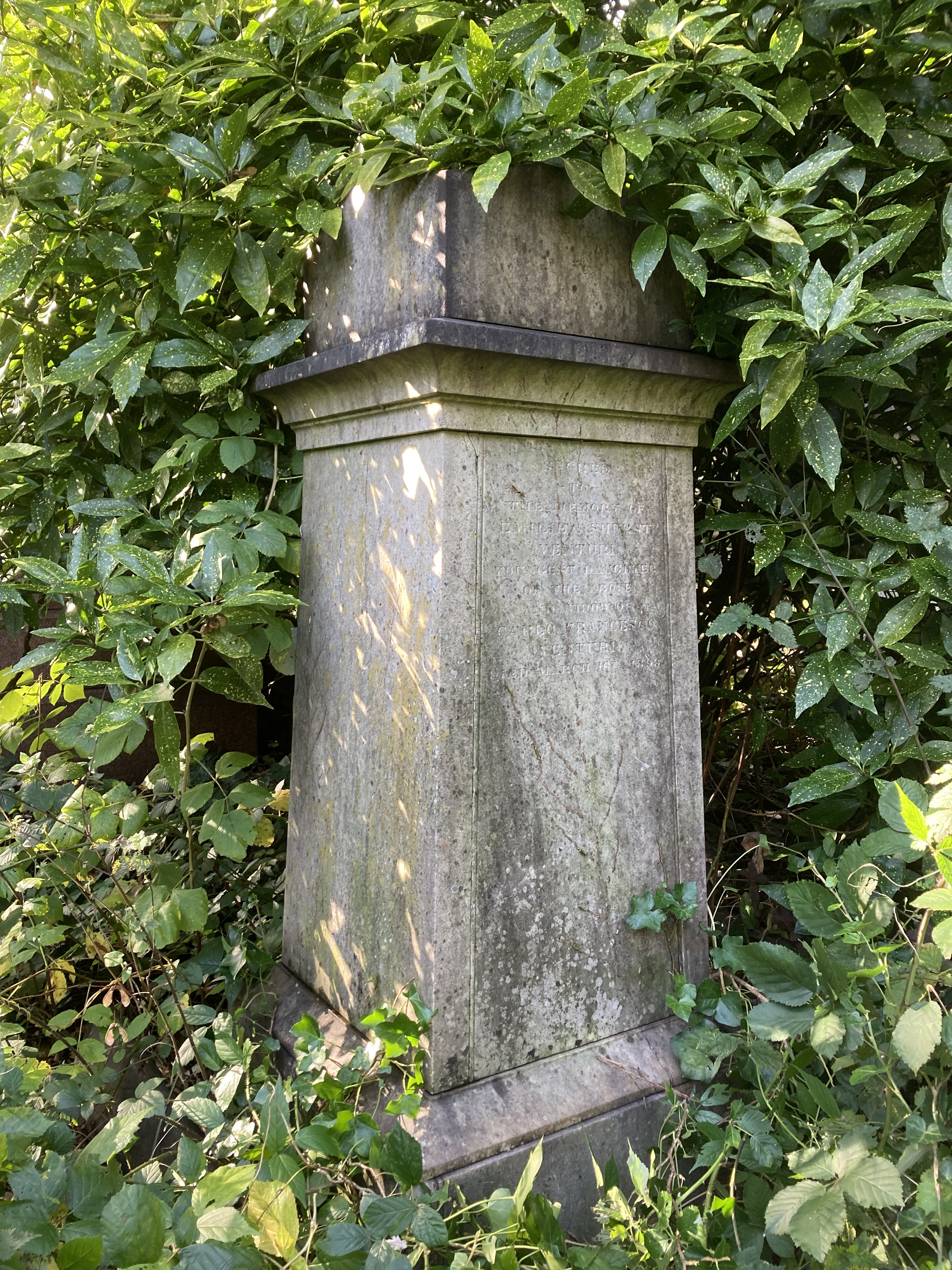
Family vault of William Henry Ashurst in Highgate Cemetery

== Works ==
In 1832 Ashurst published the Corporation Register, advocating reforms in the City of London, and especially in the court of aldermen. He published pamphlets in 1835, 1837, and 1839 against church rates, denouncing the imprisonment of Mr. Childs at Bungay, supporting an agitation in Southwark, and attacking a petition for the imprisonment of John Thoroughgood, who had refused to pay at Chelmsford.

== Family ==
Ashurst was survived by five children, all known as activists:

- William Henry Ashurst, Junior (1819–1879), who was also a solicitor;
- Elizabeth;
- Caroline, who married James Stansfeld;
- Matilda, who married Joseph Biggs; and
- Emilie Ashurst Hawkes Venturi, who married Sidney Milnes Hawkes, and then Carlo Venturi.
