= JAP =

Jap is an English slur abbreviation of the word "Japanese".

Jap may also refer to:

== Jap ==
=== People ===
- Jap Allen, American jazz musician and bandleader in the 1920s, 1930s and possibly later
- Jap Barbeau (1882–1969), American professional baseball player
- Forrest Douds (1905–1979), American college football player and National Football League player and coach
- Ken Eto (1919–2004), also known as "The Jap", American mobster and FBI informant
- Lawrence Haskell (1898–1964), American university administrator and baseball and football coach
- Jap Payne (1879–1942), American baseball player in the Negro leagues
- Jasper K. Smith (1905–1992), American politician
- Philip Jap, English singer and songwriter active in the early 1980s

=== Other uses ===
- Jap Road, former name of Boondocks Road in Fannett, Texas, United States
- The protagonist of Jap Herron, a 1917 novel that author and medium Emily Grant Hutchings claimed was dictated to her by Mark Twain after his death
- jap, ISO 639-3 code for the Madí language, spoken in Brazil

== JAP ==
- Jan Adhikar Party, a political party in Uttar Pradesh, India
- Jana Andolan Party, an Indian political party
- J. A. Prestwich Industries, a British engineering equipment manufacturing company
- Java Anon Proxy, a system designed for anonymous Web browsing
- Jewish-American princess (may also refer to "prince" or other variations)
- Journal of Applied Physics, established in 1931
- Juntas de Abastecimientos y Precios, rationing boards in Chile under president Allende
- Juventudes de Acción Popular, the youth movement of the CEDA in Spain
- JAP, local name for Johan Adolf Pengel International Airport, Paramaribo, Suriname
- JAP, callsign of Yosami Transmitting Station, a defunct VLF transmitting station
- "JAP", a single by J-Pop band Abingdon Boys School
- J.A.P. a former UK engine manufacturer

== See also ==
- Jap fiddle, a one-stringed bowed instrument from the early 20th century
- Jan Adhikar Party (Loktantrik), an Indian political party, abbreviated JAP (L)
- J. A. P. or Josiah A. P. Campbell (1830–1917), American politician and lawyer, Chief Justice of the Supreme Court of Mississippi and member of the Provisional Congress of the Confederate States
- Japji Sahib, a Sikh prayer, from "jap" (repeated praying)
- Japs (disambiguation)
- Jaap (disambiguation)
- Japp (disambiguation)
