= Japa (disambiguation) =

Japa is a spiritual discipline.

Japa may also refer to:

== People ==
- Japa (footballer, born 1986), Jonas Augusto Bouvie, Brazilian football forward
- Japa (footballer, born 1990), Endheu Kléber Nesiyama, Brazilian football forward
- Japa (footballer, born 2004), João Wellington Gadelha Melo de Oliveira, Brazilian football midfielder
- Caio Japa (born 1983), Brazilian futsal player
- Erick Japa (born 1999), Dominican football player
- Theo Japa (born 1995), Japanese-Greek football player

== Other ==
- Journal of the American Psychoanalytic Association
- Journal of the American Planning Association
- Japa, a nickname for Nigerian brain drain
- Japa (slang), a Nigerian slang term for fleeing away quickly or escaping

== See also ==
- Jap (disambiguation)
