= The Dangers of Spiritualism =

1901 Book by John Godfrey

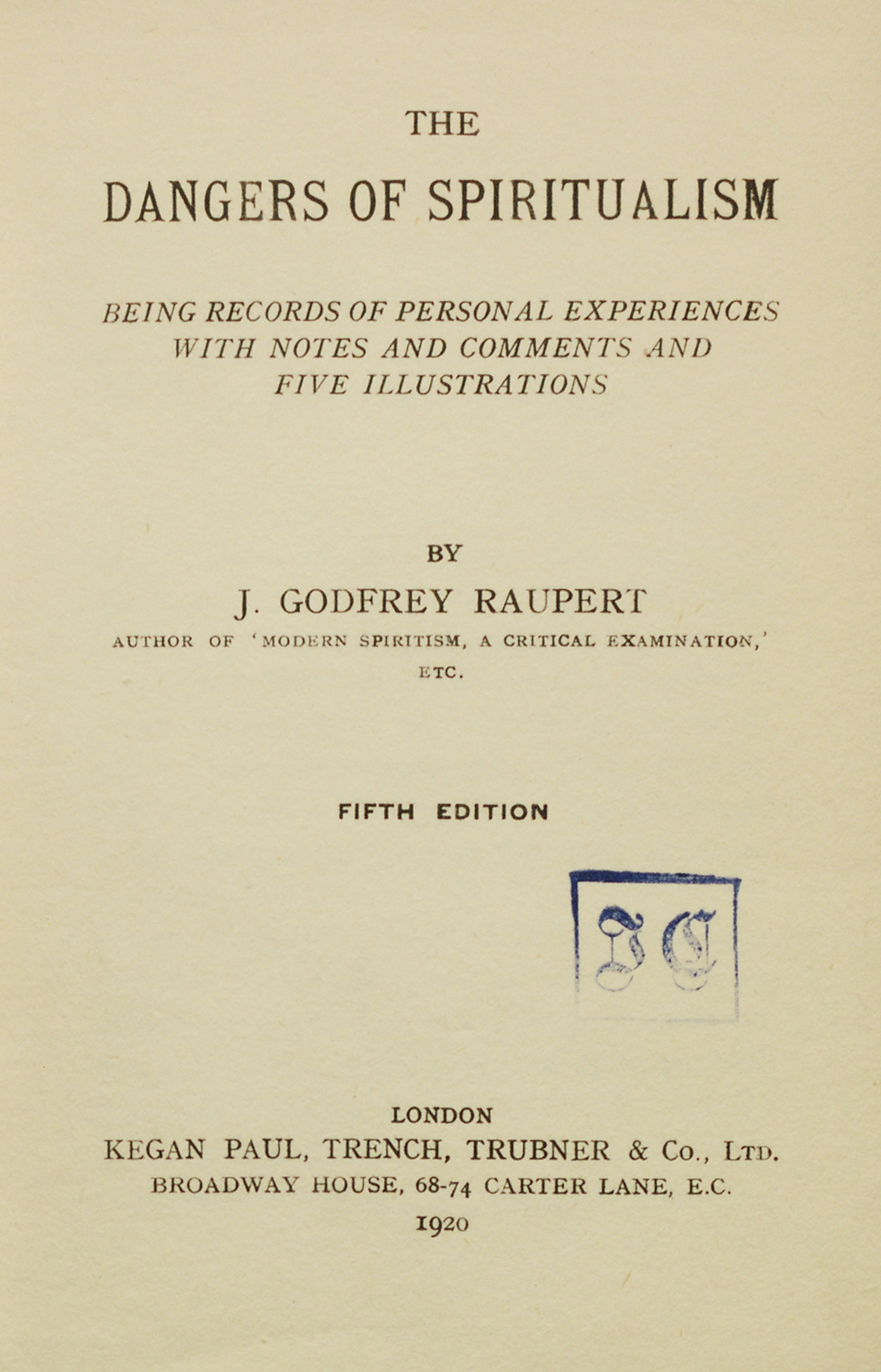
- Title page of the book
- Author: John Godfrey Raupert
- Language: English
- Subject: Spiritualism
- Genre: Case history
- Publisher: Kegan Paul Trench, Trubner & Co (UK)
- Publication date: 1920 (fifth edition)
- Publication place: England
- Media type: print
- Pages: 166 (fifth edition)

The Dangers of Spiritualism is a book by author John Godfrey Raupert (1858-1929), first published in 1901 and again published in 1920 in London (fifth edition).

Rauperts wanted to provide an account of personal experiences with the "spirit world" and a warning against the dangers of investigating it. He hoped to prove the existence of spiritualism using scientific methodology.

The methods he most often uses are spirit photography and automatic writing using a planchette. Given the time the book was published, this view was not regarded as abnormal. The case studies described in the book are collected by the author and consist mostly of his experiences and reports he received.

== Context ==
The book was published during spiritualisms peak growth in membership which happened from the 1840s to the 1920s. During that time, spiritualism flourished and had around eight million followers in Europe and the United States of America. The population of spiritualism followers was mostly composed of middle and upper classes.

== Structure ==
The book is divided into six parts. It contains a preface to the third edition, the introduction to the second edition, an introduction, six chapters, a notes and comments section and an appendix. The introductions of the third and second edition emphasize that the content still holds valid at this later time and the normal introduction is used to discuss the dangers of investigating spiritualism. In the chapters, the book comprises five instances of psychic behavior, each dealing with a different protagonist.

== Content ==
The individual cases described in this book include:

=== Case P.F. ===
This section is about the son of a family friend who the author suspects of having a "psychic gift". Raupert reports that the twenty-six year old is causing things that he comes in contact with to vibrate.

The author then conducts further experiments with P.F. without holding a classical seance. During this, P.F writes using a planchette while the author's wife talks to him to keep him occupied. He reports that they were able to speak to spirits in this way. Later, P.F. suffers a physical collapse while they are performing Spirit photography. Nevertheless, the photography was successful and the spirit was able to tell the name of the person seen on the pictures through writing before the images were developed. P.F. did not know the name and the photos indeed revealed a face similar to the aforementioned person. In a later experiment the author and P.F. are able to talk to a deceased coworker of P.F.

The author continues with describing the adverse effects that the seances had on P.F. but that he regained his good health after they stopped the experiments

=== Case M.S. ===
The second case study is about a grammar school teacher who starts talking to a deceased friend using a planchette. Later, instead of talking to his friend he finds himself talking to a different spirit. Unable to stop the automatic writing the teacher continues even at night. By talking to friends he finds out that the spirit he talks to, Jack W., died in an Asylum. After hearing this he decides to stop using the planchette but soon notices that his personality had changed after interacting with Jack W.. He reports having two personalities, one which he calls "ego"and one which he calls "alter", that represents thoughts that he normally would not have. Although he can not be sure what caused this, he suspects that his "dabbeling in telepathy" caused it.

=== The Photographer ===
This section describes experiments that Raupert conducted with a photographer in the direction of Spirit photography. They meet and take several pictures that are supposed to show spirits, although Raupert expresses concerns that the method was used fraudulent in the past. During one experiment, the author and the photographer take pictures spontaneously, which according to Raupert is evidence enough that the spirits shown on the pictures could not be faked, as they could not prepare. And indeed the developed photos show an old women. The author even talks to the spirit and subsequently shoots a clearer. picture of the spirit talks to a spirit which subsequently.

In another experiment Raupert manages to shoot a picture of a deceased relative that promised to help him in his exploration of spiritualism. Because of this, the author expresses ethical concerns regarding Spirit photography as it could potentially be dangerous to repeat such experiments.

=== Case M. ===
This case study is about an acquaintance of Raupert who underwent a "transformation of his mental and moral life, following his spiritistic experiments". He becomes interested and tries using a Planchette. After slow advances he even uses it at night and like case M.S. finds himself with two personalities after some time. In contrast to M.S. "the other one" takes complete control over M. at an increasing rate. During an experiment with M., Raupert is able to talk to the spirit directly and tells him to leave.

=== Case of the businessman ===
The last case, is about an acquaintance of the author who starts automatic writing. Although not believing in spirits but rather in unconsciousness as the cause of it, he makes it a habit of his. After some time, he experienced a pressing feeling on top of his hat that would only disappear if he writes. After some months apart, the author meets his acquaintance again, who was involved in a severe accident and only just left the hospital. He tells Raupert that he was sitting inside an electric tram, when he had the irresistible urge to jump of the train while it was still in motion and run alongside it. He planned on jumping back on at the front end. Instead, he fell and his feet were crushed by the tram. He thinks the spirits are responsible for it and regrets that he did not follow Rauperts earlier advice to stop automatic writing.

== Reception and Change of John Godfrey Raupert ==
The book seems to have been well received as several editions were published. The author John Godfrey Raupert later converted to Catholicism and renounced Spiritualism. He was commissioned by Pope Pius X to warn Catholics about the Ouija board. The Ouija board is one of the successor of the Planchette. He is reported to have said: "For more reasons than one the board should not be tolerated in any Christian household or placed within the reach of the young."

== See also ==
- Spiritualism
- List of Spiritualist organizations
- Spiritism

== Sources ==
- Raupert, John Godfrey (1920). The Dangers of Spiritualism. London: Kegan Paul Trench, Trubner & Co.
