= Japp =

Japp may refer to:

- Alexander Hay Japp (1837–1905), Scottish author, journalist and publisher
- Francis Robert Japp (1848–1925), British chemist
- Mikel Japp (1952–2012), Welsh musician
- Ted Japp, American politician
- Chief Inspector Japp, a fictional police officer created by crime writer Agatha Christie
- Japp, a chocolate bar produced, marketed and sold by Marabou in Sweden and Freia in Norway

== See also ==
- JAP (disambiguation)
- Jaap (disambiguation)
