= Isa Knox (writer) =

Scottish poet, novelist, editor and writer

- Born: 17 October 1831
- Died: 23 December 1903 (aged 72)
- Occupation: Novelist
- Writing career
- Genre: Poetry

Isa Knox (née Craig; 17 October 1831 – 23 December 1903) was a Scottish poet, novelist, editor, and writer. She was secretary to the National Association for the Promotion of Social Science, and one of the first staff members of the English Woman's Journal.

== Biography ==
=== Early life ===
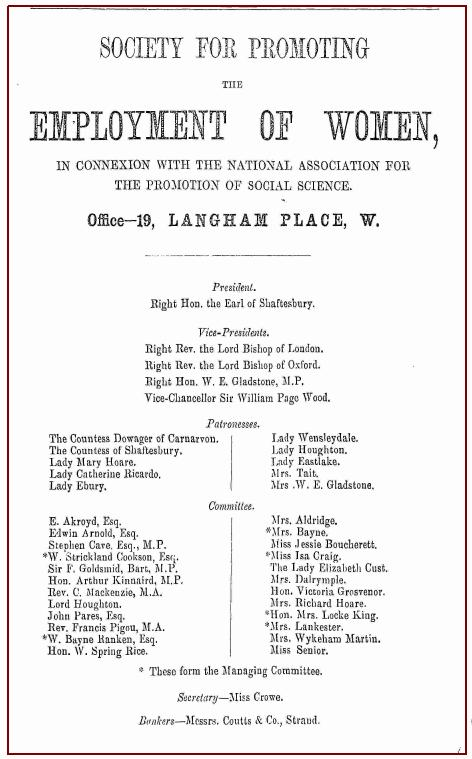
Notice appearing in the Alexandria Magazine mentioning "Miss Isa Craig," 1 May 1864.

Isa Craig Knox was the only child of John Craig, hosier and glover, and Ann Braick Craig, born on 17 October 1831 in Saint Cuthbert's, Edinburgh. In childhood she lost both parents, and was reared by her grandmother. Due to financial hardship, she was forced to leave school in her tenth year; consequently, from a young age, her literary abilities were largely self-taught. A close study of standard English authors such as Gibbon, Addison and his contemporaries, Shakespeare, Milton, Cowper and Burns were major influences and developed her literary tastes, which influenced her subsequent attempts at writing. After contributing verses to The Scotsman with the signature Isa, she was regularly employed on the paper starting in 1853.

=== Marriage and family ===
Several years after relocating to London to pursue a writing and activism career, on 17 May 1866, Craig married her cousin, John Knox, a London iron merchant, at St. John's Church, Deptford in Lewisham. It has been described as an "easy marriage." The couple had a daughter named Margaret, who was born in the same parish in which they were married. On 25 July 1869, Isabella and her husband had their daughter baptized at St Peter's Brockley, Lewisham. In the 1881 United Kingdom census, the family, along with John's older brother William, a book-keeper also working in the iron trade, and a servant is listed as living at 13 South Hill Park, in Hempstead, Kent. Ten years later, in the 1881 United Kingdom census, the same household is listed as having moved to 86 Breakspears Rd in Deptford, London. By the time of the 1901 United Kingdom census, the family had moved to No. 88 on the same street and had taken on an additional servant.

==== Early career and activism ====
After coming to London in 1857, Craig was appointed to be the first female secretary to the National Association for the Promotion of Social Science, and held the position, despite enduring public scorn for several years due to her sex. Craig was one of the first staff members of the English Woman's Journal which routinely questioned customs such as opportunities for employment and the division of labour between men and women; actions for the women of the time were often restrained by notions of what was proper conduct for a "lady." A friend and comrade was another major feminist figure, Elizabeth "Bessie" Rayner Parkes, whom Craig had met through her work with The Waverley Journal, an Edinburgh women's magazine.

During her early career, Craig also faced discrimination due to her obscure origins and Scottish identity. In her 1910 memoir Recollections of What I Saw, What I Lived Through, and What I Learned, during More than Fifty Years of Social and Literary Experience, the Scottish poet Isabella Fyvie Mayo describes hearing a well-connected, literary Englishwoman, Miss Y-, who detested "gutter blood," cast aspersions on the lowly work Isa had taken in Edinburgh to "secure independence before she had made her mark in literature," even bringing it up to her face at a public gathering. To Mayo's admiration, Isa Craig "gently refrained" from offering a retort.

Isa contributed to the advancement of women during the Victorian period, publishing many works specifically to promote the education of women and joining many organizations striving towards that same goal, such as the newly formed Langham Place circle, a group of privileged women who hoped to open up more professions to women, besides those of nurses and teachers. Besides working as a trailblazer for the advancement of women's suffrage in England, Knox also was an anti-slavery advocate. She published many poems on the subject of slavery and treated the subject in other prose works, including The Essence of Slavery, Extracted from "A Journal of a Residence on a Georgian Plantation," by Frances Ann Kemble (1863) and Easy History for Upper Standards (1884).

=== Prize-winning Ode ===
In 1858 Isa wrote and submitted a resonant ode entitled "On the Centenary of Burns: An Ode" as her entry for a prize of £50 offered at the Crystal Palace for a centenary poem on Scottish poet Robert Burns. Out of 621 candidates, among them such literary figures as Frederic William Henry Myers, Gerald Massey, and Arthur Joseph Munby, Isa won the prize. As Burns was regarded as the national poet of Scotland, to win this contest in England as a woman, was quite an achievement for Isa. Unaware that she had won the contest, Isa was absent, so her poem was read aloud in her stead before a cheering crowd of thousands in the Crystal Palace who responded to the poem with a standing ovation and cries for the author to appear; her name was mistakenly pronounced "Esau," since the awarders assumed the winner must be male.

This poem remains her most cited and praised work, one stanza of which appears below:

The land he trod

Hath now become a place of pilgrimage;

Where dearer are the daisies of the sod

That could his song engage.

The hoary hawthorn, wreathed

Above the bank on which his limbs he flung

While some sweet plaint he breathed;

The streams he wandered near;

The maidens whom he loved; the songs he sung;—

All, all are dear!

=== Later career ===
In 1863, cotton exports in Lancashire were significantly decreased due to the American Civil War, causing great financial hardship to mill workers, so Knox edited a volume by poets to dedicate to the town for their hardships and raise money. Among the contributors was the poet Christina Rossetti; the published volume was named Poems: An Offering to Lancashire. In 1863, she contributed along with the likes of Charles Kingsley, W. Holman Hunt, Elizabeth Gaskell, and Thomas Hughes to The Reader, a weekly review of literature, art, and science, newly published in London.

After her marriage, Knox published pieces occasionally in Fraser's Magazine, Good Words, and the Quiver, edited the Argosy, a travel and tales magazine, for a short time, and published some volumes of poems and juvenile histories. She completed many poems, newspaper articles and reviews in the later half of her career, most of whom are little known. Many of Knox's works were never attributed to her. Partial lists of her work can be found in various scholarly works on British literature, but some of her novels, such as her first, Mark Warren, are more obscure.

==== Death and legacy ====
Isa Knox died at 88 Breakspears Road, Brockley, on 23 December 1903. Her burial took place 30 December 1903 in Lewisham, London, England. At the time of her death, she was beloved by many, as her numerous writings and activities had contributed to awareness of the need for social and political reform. Her questioning of the gender roles and class standards of the Victorian Era made her controversial, yet memorable for her time. The 1911 United Kingdom census reveals that her unmarried daughter Margaret, widowed husband, and his brother continued to live at the same address, with two domestic servants.

It appears that on 27 May 1922, Margaret, aged 52 and giving her race as "Scotch," arrived in Quebec on the ocean liner RMS Victorian. She had travelled to Canada to visit a friend, the Rev. Arthur Garlick, incumbent of the Diocese of Caledonia. There is no record of Isa's daughter ever marrying or having children.

== Literary analysis ==
Not only did Isa Knox face contemporary criticism of her writings, but also faced public scorn for her views, especially as expressed in the English Women's Journal. One critic wrote to the editor of the Daily News of their concern regarding Knox's expressions, stating, "women's cause is man's" and "women never can, or ought to compete with man." While Knox's poems and writings have been regarded as "successful" in her own era, she has been praised for possessing and exerting great "intellectual powers."

According to the Dictionary of National Biography, in verse Knox produced nothing that was considered to have surpassed the excellency of the Burns ode. Her first volume, Poems by Isa (1866), showed some promise, and some lyric quality appeared in Poems: an Offering to Lancashire (1863), an anthology edited by Knox, as well as in Duchess Agnes, a Drama and other Poems (1864) and Songs of Consolation (1874). Dr. A. H. Japp edited a Selection from Mrs. Knox's Poems in 1892. Of Mrs. Knox's prose work, The Essence of Slavery (1863) summarized Fanny Kemble's influential Journal of a Residence on a Georgian Plantation, and Esther West (1870; 6th edit. 1884) was a well-constructed story. Mrs. Knox's Little Folk's History of England (1872) reached its 30th thousand in 1899, and the author adapted from it a successful Easy History for Upper Standards (1884). Tales on the Parables, two series, appeared in 1872–7.

Isa Knox's poems focused on themes such as nature and its changes, the Earth as the Lord's gift, and passing time. In her sonnet "Spring" appears the following memorable lines:

I love the spring-time for the lengthening light,

And coming beauty. 'Tis like childhood's hours,

When life is all before is stretching bright,

And full with promise of its summer flowers,-

When tears are soonest shed and soonest dried,

And love hath no disguise, and beauty hath no pride.

Other notable poems include "The Incarnation," "Never to Know," and "Wind and Stars."

== Works ==
- Poems: an Offering to Lancashire (as editor) (1863)
- Poems by Isa (1866)
- The Essence of Slavery (1863)
- Duchess Agnes, a Drama and other Poems (1864)
- Songs of Consolation (1874)
- Esther West (1870; 6th edit. 1884)
- Little Folk's History of England (1872)
- The Good Samaritan (1872)
- The Cumberer of the Ground (1872)
- Tales on the Parables (two series, 1872-7)
- Peggy Ogilvie's Inheritance (1880)
- The Half-Sisters (1881)
- In Duty Bound (1881)
- Deepdale Vicarage (1884)
- Easy History for Upper Standards (1884)
- Our Summer Home (1888)
- Hold Fast by Your Sundays (1889)
- Selection from Mrs. Knox's Poems (edited by Alexander Hay Japp) (1892)
