= Helen Peters Nosworthy =

American spiritualist and medium (1851-1940)

Helen Augusta Peters Nosworthy (September 19, 1851 – November 8, 1940) was an American spiritualist and medium. She is considered the "mother" of modern Ouija, having named and helped patent the board in 1890.

== Early life ==
Helen Peters was born in 1851 in Baltimore, Maryland. Her affluent family was part of Southern society had many ties to the Confederate Army during the American Civil War. Helen and her siblings would often take buttons from dead soldiers after battles.

== Ouija board ==
The spiritualist movement began in the United States around the time of Nosworthy's birth. The movement gained further popularity following American Civil War. Mediums did significant business in allegedly allowing survivors to contact lost relatives. Living in Baltimore, Nosworthy became a medium and spiritualist herself. Her sister, Mary, had married Elijah Bond who had invented a talking board with his business partner, Charles W. Kennard. Nosworthy became a stockholder in the Kennard Novelty Company but they needed a marketable name to manufacture the board. One night in 1890, they decided to hold a seance and ask the board what it wanted to be called. Nosworthy repeatedly asked the board, and it answered O-U-I-J-A. When they asked what that meant, the board answered, G-O-O-D L-U-C-K. Nosworthy was wearing a locket at the time containing a portrait of English novelist Ouida whose signature below seemed to spell out "ouija". The local patent office at first refused a patent of the talking board. Bond and Nosworthy then traveled to Washington, D.C. where they were also denied a patent until the chief patent officer asked the board to spell out his name, which it did.

== Later life ==
Sometime in the years after the ouija board patent was granted, Nosworthy's family's collection of Confederate buttons went missing. They asked the ouija board who had stolen them, and the board implicated one of the family members. Nosworthy refused to believe the board and disavowed it, spending the rest of her life telling her family that the board ‘told lies.’ In 1891, Nosworthy married Ernest Nosworthy (1864–1937), a Shakespearean actor and later traveling salesman and relocated to Denver, Colorado.

Nosworthy died in Denver in 1940. Little was known about her life or contributions to the ouija board until the Robert Murch of the Talking Board Historical Society found correspondence from ouija board inventors Charles Kennard and Elijah Bond published in the Baltimore Sun. On September 22, 2018, the Talking Board Historical Society, the mayor of Denver, the president of the Fairmount Heritage Foundation as well as descendants and onlookers gathered at the gravesite of Nosworthy in Denver's Fairmount Cemetery to dedicate a memorial in her honor.
