= Planchette =

Wood paddle used in spiritualist activities

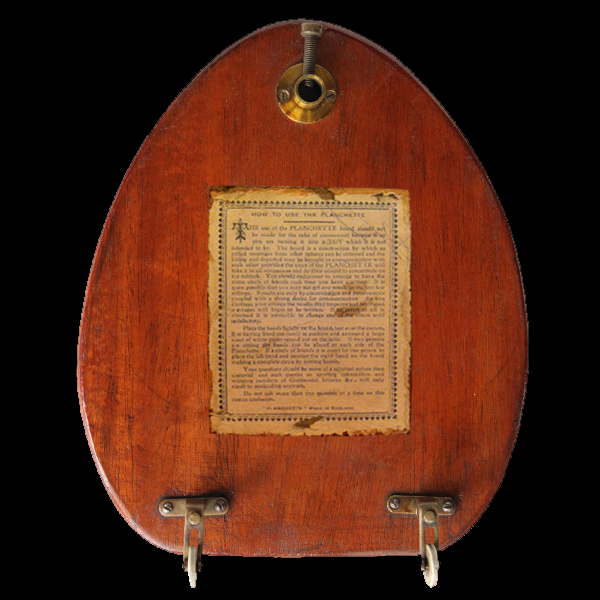
Early British Planchette, 1850s–60s.

A planchette ( /plɑːnˈʃɛt/ or /plænˈʃɛt/), from the French for "little plank", is a small, usually heart-shaped flat piece of wood, equipped with two wheeled casters and a pencil-holding aperture pointing downwards, used to facilitate automatic writing. The use of planchettes to produce mysterious written messages gave rise to the belief that the devices foster communication with spirits as a form of mediumship. The devices became popular in séances during the Victorian era, before their eventual evolution into the simpler, non-writing pointing devices for ouija boards that eclipsed the popularity of their original form. Scientists explain that the motion is due to the ideomotor effect, but paranormal advocates believe that the planchette is moved by the presence of spirits or by some form of subtle energy.

Planchettes took on a variety of forms during the height of their popularity. American planchettes were traditionally heart- or shield-shaped, but manufacturers produced a wide range of shapes and sizes, hoping to distinguish themselves in the highly competitive and profitable market of the devices' late-1860s heyday. Manufacturers espoused the wonders and benefits of different materials (including various hardwoods, India rubber, and even glass), insulated casters, and various attachments meant to "charge" the devices or to insulate the user from malevolent spirits. In Great Britain, planchettes took on the classical shapes popularized in early illustrations and newspaper depictions, with round, blunt noses and flat backs. Regardless of their shape or country of origin, almost all planchettes were equipped with brass casters and small wheels of bone or plastic, and their sometimes lavishly illustrated boxes were often packed with blank parchment, pencils, ouija-like folding letter-sheets, and esoteric instructions claiming the mysterious communicative powers for the items.

Though planchettes experienced great surges of popularity in Victorian times, in modern usage the term is most commonly associated with the heart-shaped pointers for Ouija or "talking boards". Rather than writing, these devices "dictate" messages by pointing to the board's printed letters and numbers. As writing planchettes were popularized during the beginning of the spiritualist movement of the mid-19th century, planchettes pre-date the popularization of talking boards by nearly four decades.

== History ==
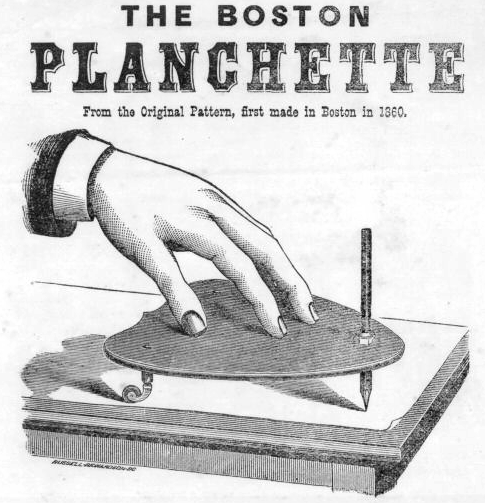
1860 ad for Boston Planchette

Planchettes rose to prominence in the years following the establishment of spiritualism in America, which began with the purported spirit communications of the Fox Sisters in 1848 and the resulting popularity of supernatural-themed parlor games, séances, and experiments in mediumship and table-turning. Participants in these events would experience strange movements of tables, and communicate with spirits that indicated their messages through a series of coded negative or affirmative knocks. In other instances, sitters received more complicated messages of spelled-out words and phrases by transcribing letters indicated by the knocks or raps as the participants called out the alphabet into the empty air. Believers in these spirit communications soon began to experiment with refining and expediting various forms of communication, including pointing to letters printed on alphabet cards, automatic writing, direct channeling, and other methods.

In the winter of 1852–53, the fervor of the Modern Spiritualism movement and spirit communications reached Europe, where the French educator and eventual founder of Spiritism, Allan Kardec claimed that on 10 June 1853 a séance participant received a spiritual message proposing a more expedient alternative to the laborious processes of alphabet-calling and rapped responses. According to Kardec, the spirit suggested the group secure a pencil to a small upturned basket, allowing multiple participants to cooperatively write out messages from the attending spirits. After some refinements to construct a more sturdy wooden plank, word of the invention spread throughout Paris and into England, where a cottage industry sprang up to produce the devices.

The use of planchettes in Europe became popular enough to attract the attention of the Bishop of Viviers, who railed against their use in a pastoral letter in 1853. Despite their respected status in the growing religion of Spiritualism, planchettes remained a specialized novelty for adherents for the next 15 years, produced only within a small cottage industry or on special request by scientific instrument manufacturers. During this period, they remained popular only among devout séance circles and enthusiastic Spiritualists, who at the time still largely relied on the services of celebrity mediums (such as the Fox Sisters and D.D. Home) to lead spirit communications, rather than using planchettes and other "do-it-yourself" devices. Mediums, seeing their monopoly threatened, often rallied against the devices and warned of the dangers of amateur experimentation.

Planchettes came to America in 1858 when Spiritualist and social reformer Robert Dale Owen and his friend Dr. H.F. Gardner observed the devices in use at séances in Paris, and returned with several of them. Their friend, the Boston bookseller G.W. Cottrell, became the first to manufacture planchettes on a large scale the following year.

In 1867, the British publication Once a Week published a sensational piece on planchettes. The article was reprinted in European and American newspapers, and by 1868 dozens of booksellers and toy manufacturers were producing the items to meet an insatiable demand on both sides of the Atlantic. Kirby & Co., the undisputed kings of planchette manufacturing, claimed to have sold over 200,000 in their first season alone.

Over the years, planchette manufacturers included such established firms as Selchow & Righter, George G. Bussey, Jaques & Son, Chad Valley, and even the great magician and crystal seer Alexander.

== Decline and evolution ==
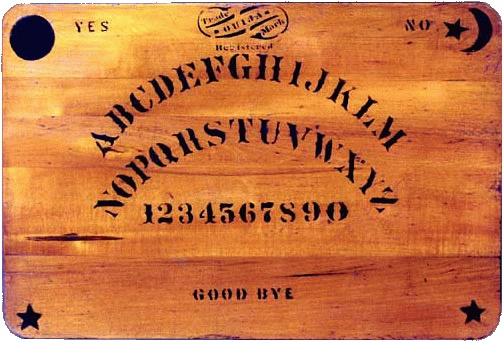
1891 Kennard Novelty Co. Ouija Board

Following the commercial introduction of the Ouija board by Charles Kennard's Kennard Novelty Company and acquisition of the talking board patent by his partner Elijah Bond on 1 July 1890, automatic-writing planchettes took a secondary role to the suddenly popular Ouija board and the many imitators its success spawned. Though early press articles had dubbed the Ouija the "new planchette", the patentees were initially quick to differentiate their devices from classic automatic writers by pairing them with paddle-shaped, pencil-less pointers far different in shape from other planchettes of the period. The design changes and focus on the elegantly varnished boards and their clearly stenciled letters arching across their fronts seem to have had the intended effect, and the items were enthusiastically welcomed by the public in much the same way planchettes had experienced their own craze some 23 years previously. From this point on, the pencil-equipped planchettes that had facilitated often-garbled spirit writing for nearly four decades were quickly shoved aside in favor of the cleaner, faster communications of these new "talking boards". Though writing planchettes would enjoy brief revivals in subsequent years as the Ouija's popularity similarly waxed and waned, by the 1930s only British toy companies such as Glevum Games continued to produce true writing planchettes in any worthwhile numbers. By the Ouija revival that followed the Second World War, true writing planchettes were no longer being manufactured in any significant numbers anywhere, having been finally completely taken over by the more popular Ouija as they faded into obscurity.

== In popular culture ==
"Mystic Hand" planchette

During the initial craze in the late 1860s, planchettes became the subject of several popular songs sold in sheet music form. In 1868, the C.Y. Fonda sheet music company of Cincinnati published the "Planchette Polka", composed by August La Motte, dedicated to Kirby & Co, which was the dominant planchette manufacturer of the day. Also in 1868, the Lee & Walker sheet music company of Philadelphia debuted the song "Planchette" with words by Elmer Ruan Coates and music by Eastburn. The song includes the chorus "Planchette, planchette, oh! Let me see/What luck you have in store for me!" In 1870, Oliver & Ditson sheet music company of Boston published "Planchette: The Celebrated Comic Song" with words by G.A. Meazie Jr, as popularized by the singer Henry Clay Barnabee. Barnabee described the song as "named after a little pseudo-psychic machine, a fad of the hour".

The 9 July 1892 Volume 103 edition of Punch included a cartoon depicting an impish devil pushing a planchette toward a prediction of the next Derby winner, claiming the device would "put an end to all speculation".

The 25 March 1907 edition of the Washington Post famously depicted President Teddy Roosevelt as a scribbling planchette in their satirical "Political Planchette Board" cartoon. The illustration depicts Roosevelt's struggle between Independent Democracy on one hand, and Progressive Republicans on the other. Roosevelt's planchette form is writing out "Victory" over the two factions with the planchette's pencil.

Use of a planchette is featured in the 1948 novel No Highway by Nevil Shute, where the written message obtained by automatic writing provides the information necessary to locate of the tail plane of a crashed aircraft.

In The Haunting of Hill House, a 1959 novel by Shirley Jackson, Mrs. Montague uses a planchette in an attempt to communicate with spirits in Hill House, while Mr. Montague and the original group disagree with her charlatanic methods.

Artist Frederick Sands depicted the planchette in use in his watercolor "La Planchette" in the 1960s.

Drag queen Sharon Needles wore a "Mystic Hand" planchette on her forehead as a fashion statement when she was crowned "America's Next Drag Superstar" on RuPaul's Drag Race, April 2012. Ms. Needles has confirmed on her Facebook wall that the planchette was a 1940s original, not a modern reproduction. The wooden planchette was manufactured c. 1940 by the Haskell Manufacturing Corporation in Chicago, Illinois, and was sold with a version of a Ouija board called the "Hasko Mystic Board".

In August 2012, the Baltimore Museum of Industry hosted the first-of-its-kind retrospective ouija board exhibit. The exhibit featured two rare planchette specimens to represent the early evolution of talking boards, including a Selchow & Righter "Scientific Planchette" and a G.W. Cottrell "Boston Planchette".

== See also ==
- Fuji (planchette writing)
- Song: "Planchette" on IMSLP
