= Japa (footballer, born 1990) =

Brazilian footballer

Personal information
- Full name: Endheu Kléber Nesiyama
- Date of birth: 28 March 1990 (age 36)
- Place of birth: São Paulo, Brazil
- Height: 1.75 m (5 ft 9 in)
- Position: Forward

Youth career
- Vila Flor

Senior career*
Years	Team	Apps	(Gls)
2013	Espinho	9	(3)
2013	Covilhã	1	(0)
2014	Vila Flor	5	(1)
2014–2015	Oliveira do Hospital	10	(2)
- * Club domestic league appearances and goals

Endheu Kléber Nesiyama (born 28 March 1990), commonly known as Japa, is a former Brazilian footballer.

== Career statistics ==
=== Club ===
Club	Season	League			National Cup		League Cup		Other		Total	
Club	Season	Division	Apps	Goals	Apps	Goals	Apps	Goals	Apps	Goals	Apps	Goals
Espinho	2012–13	Segunda Divisão	9	3	0	0	–		0	0	9	3
Covilhã	2013–14	Segunda Liga	1	0	0	0	1 (Note: Appearances in the Taça da Liga)	0	0	0	2	0
Vila Flor	2013–14	Campeonato Nacional de Seniores	5	1	0	0	–		0	0	5	1
Oliveira do Hospital	2014–15	Campeonato Nacional de Seniores	10	2	0	0	–		0	0	10	2
Career total			25	6	0	0	1	0	0	0	26	6
