= Jap Herron =

1917 novel by Emily Grant Hutchings and Lola Hays

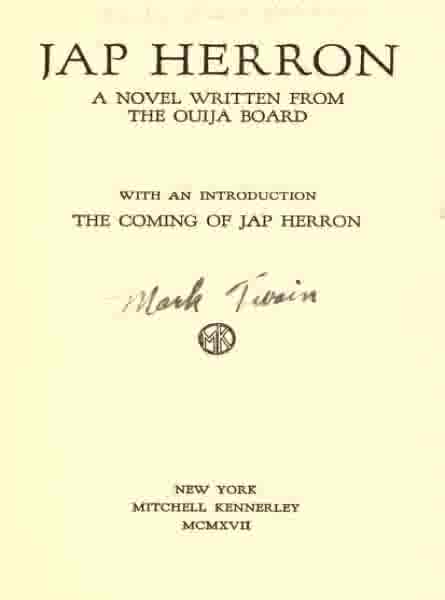
- Author: Emily Grant Hutchings, Lola V. Hays
- Language: English
- Genre: American fiction
- Publisher: Mitchell Kennerley
- Publication date: 1917
- Publication place: United States
- Pages: 245
- Text: Jap Herron at Wikisource

Jap Herron: A Novel Written From The Ouija Board is a 1917 novel that author and self-proclaimed medium Emily Grant Hutchings claimed was written by Mark Twain, seven years after his death. Hutchings said that the novel was dictated to her and medium Lola Hays from beyond the grave by the deceased Twain through use of a Ouija board.

== Plot summary and reception ==
The main character is Jasper James Herron, whose nickname serves as the book's title. The New York Times, in the aforementioned 1917 review, described the book's plot and provided comment:

The story itself, a long novelette, is scened in a Missouri town and tells how a lad born to poverty and shiftlessness, by the help of a fine-souled and high-minded man and woman, grew into a noble and useful manhood and helped to regenerate his town. There is evident a rather striking knowledge of the conditions of life and the peculiarities of character in a Missouri town, the dialect is true, and the picture has, in general, many features that will seem familiar to those who know their "Tom Sawyer" and "Huckleberry Finn." A country paper fills an important place in the tale, and there is constant proof of familiarity with the life and work of the editor of such a sheet. The humor impresses as a feeble attempt at imitation and, while there is now and then a strong sure touch of pathos or a swift and true revelation of human nature, the "sob stuff" that oozes through many of the scenes, and the overdrawn emotions are too much for credulity. If this is the best that "Mark Twain" can do by reaching across the barrier, the army of admirers that his works have won for him will all hope that he will hereafter respect that boundary.

The Oakland Tribune commented:

"Jap Herron," without Mark Twain's name, would find ready sale as an interesting story in which humor and pathos are mingled. Had Mark Twain written it while he was alive it is probable that his publishers would have advised against its appearance, for in no way could it do anything but detract from his reputation. The style is not Mark Twain's, the choice of words is not his, and to the lover of the humorist, the book is in no other way his.

== Production history ==
The novel rose to fame when The New York Times ran a review of the book on September 9, 1917. The work was claimed to be authored by the spirit of late Mark Twain by two mediums, Emily Grant Hutchings and Lola V. Hays, with Hays being the passive recipient whose hands guided the Ouija board. Previously, Hutchings had tried to contact Patience Worth. The two mediums purported to have started transcribing the novel in 1915, and that it took Twain two years to complete. Due to the popularity of Ouija boards at the time, many Americans purchased the book and accepted Hutchings' claims at face value.

=== Copyright lawsuit ===
In an attempt to stop Hutchings from profiting from Mark Twain's name, Clara Clemens (Mark Twain's daughter) filed a lawsuit in New York County Supreme Court against Hutchings and her publisher, Mitchell Kennerley, on June 8, 1918. Because Clemens and her publishers were unable to prove that the book was not written by the ghost of Twain, a lawsuit was filed to have Hutchings either admit the book was a fraud or surrender all profits to the Mark Twain estate and Harper & Brothers, who at the time had sole rights to the publication of Mark Twain stories. While Hutchings never retracted her claims, the lawsuit was eventually dropped when Hutchings agreed to destroy all existing copies and cease publication.
