= Japs (disambiguation) =

Japs is a slur abbreviation of Japanese people. It may also refer to:

- Japs Cuan, Filipino basketball coach and former player
- Japs Sergio (born 1979), Filipino musician, singer and record producer
- Järvenpään Palloseura (abbreviated JäPS), a Finnish football club
