= Ouija =

Flat board for communicating with spirits

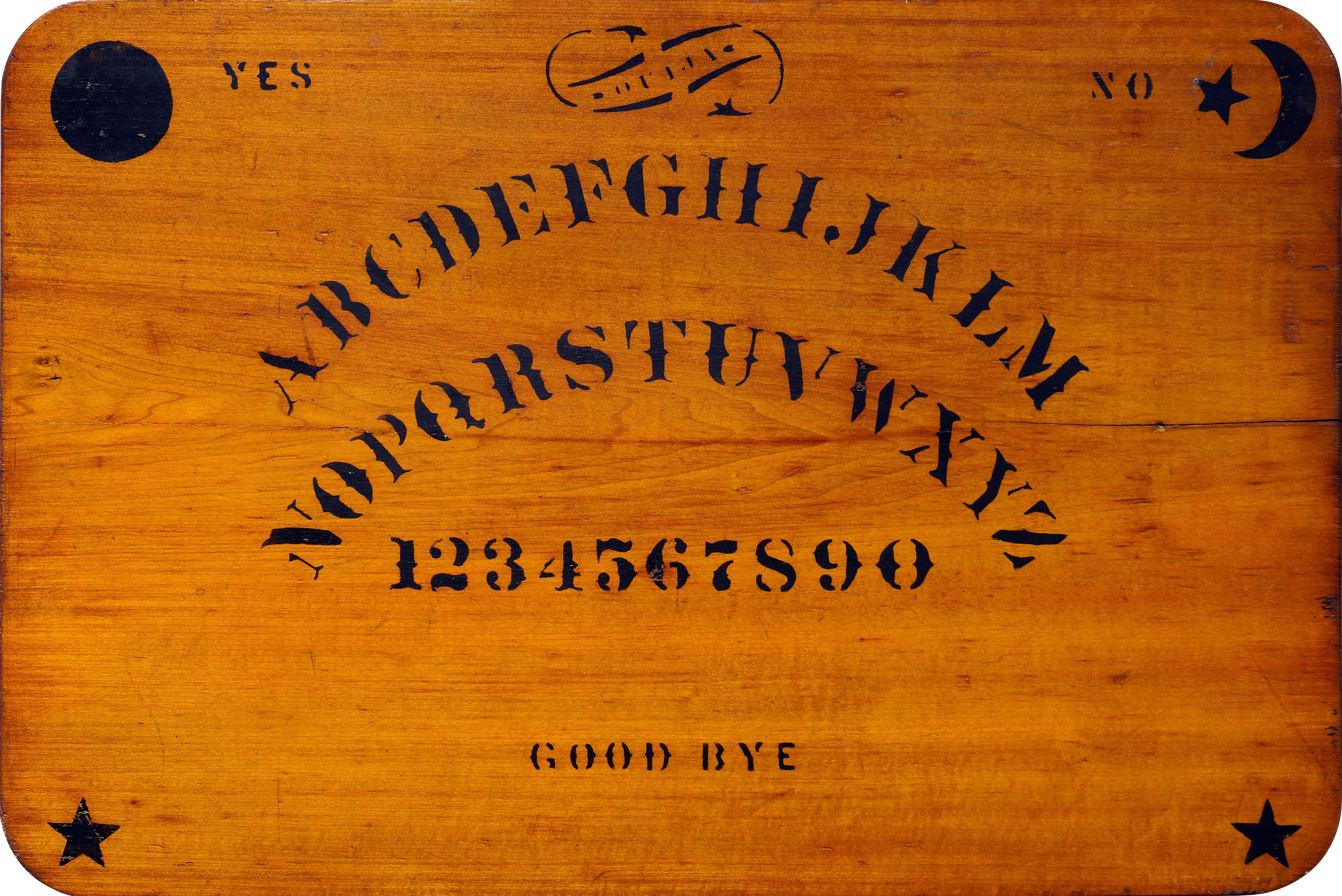
An original Ouija board circa 1890

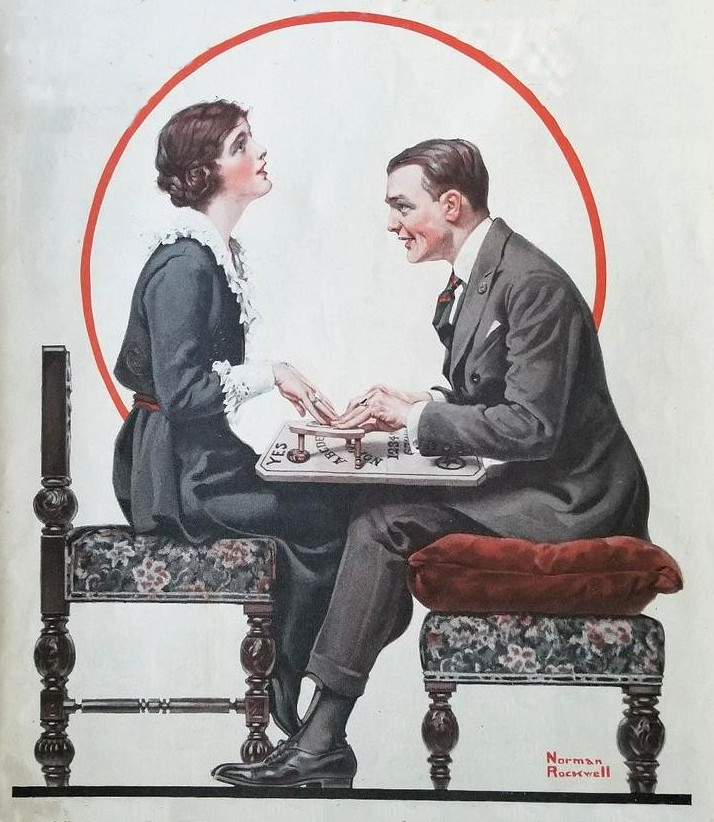
Norman Rockwell cover of the May 1, 1920, issue of The Saturday Evening Post, showing a Ouija board in use

The Ouija (/ˈwiːdʒə/ WEE-jə, /-dʒi/ -jee), also known as a Ouija board, spirit board, talking board, or witch board, is a flat board marked with the letters of the Latin alphabet, the numbers 0–9, the words yes, no, and occasionally hello and goodbye, along with various symbols and graphics. It uses a planchette (a small heart-shaped piece of wood or plastic) as a movable indicator to spell out messages during a séance. Participants place their fingers on the planchette, which is moved about the board to spell words. The name "Ouija" is a trademark of Hasbro (inherited from Parker Brothers), but is often used generically to refer to any talking board.

Spiritualists in the United States believed that the dead were able to contact the living, and reportedly used a talking board very similar to the modern Ouija board at their camps in Ohio during 1886 with the intent of enabling faster communication with spirits. Following its commercial patent by Baltimore lawyer Elijah Bond in 1891, the Ouija board was regarded as an innocent parlor game unrelated to the occult until American spiritualist Pearl Curran popularized its use as a divining tool during World War I.

Paranormal and supernatural beliefs associated with Ouija have been criticized by the scientific community and are characterized as pseudoscience. The action of the board can be most easily explained by unconscious movements of those controlling the pointer, a psychophysiological phenomenon known as the ideomotor effect.

Catholicism and many Protestant Christian denominations have warned against the use of Ouija boards, considering their use in Satanic practices, while other religious groups hold that they can lead to demonic possession. Occultists, on the other hand, are divided on the issue, with some claiming it can be a tool for positive transformation, while others reiterate the warnings of many Christians and caution "inexperienced users" against it.

== Etymology ==
Ouija is a product name first used in the United States in the early 1890s. It has no established origin or meaning; although, there are numerous claimants all connected to the same Baltimore, Maryland, company that marketed and sold the boards.

The principal of the Baltimore company that originally made Ouija boards, William Fuld, claimed to have invented the name by combining the words for yes in French (oui) and German (ja); however, another principal of the same company, C. W. Kennard, claimed it was Egyptian for "good luck". Both men said the board itself gave them the name. According to historian Robert Murch, the name "Ouija" was provided by medium Helen Peters Nosworthy, the sister in-law of Baltimore lawyer Elijah Bond, connected to the same Baltimore company. During one session, Nosworthy asked the board what they should name it, and the board spelled out "Ouija". When she asked the board what the word meant, the answer she found was "good luck". In a further mystery to the name's origin, Nosworthy later acknowledged that during the reading she had been wearing a locket with a picture of English author "Ouida".

== History ==
=== Precursors ===
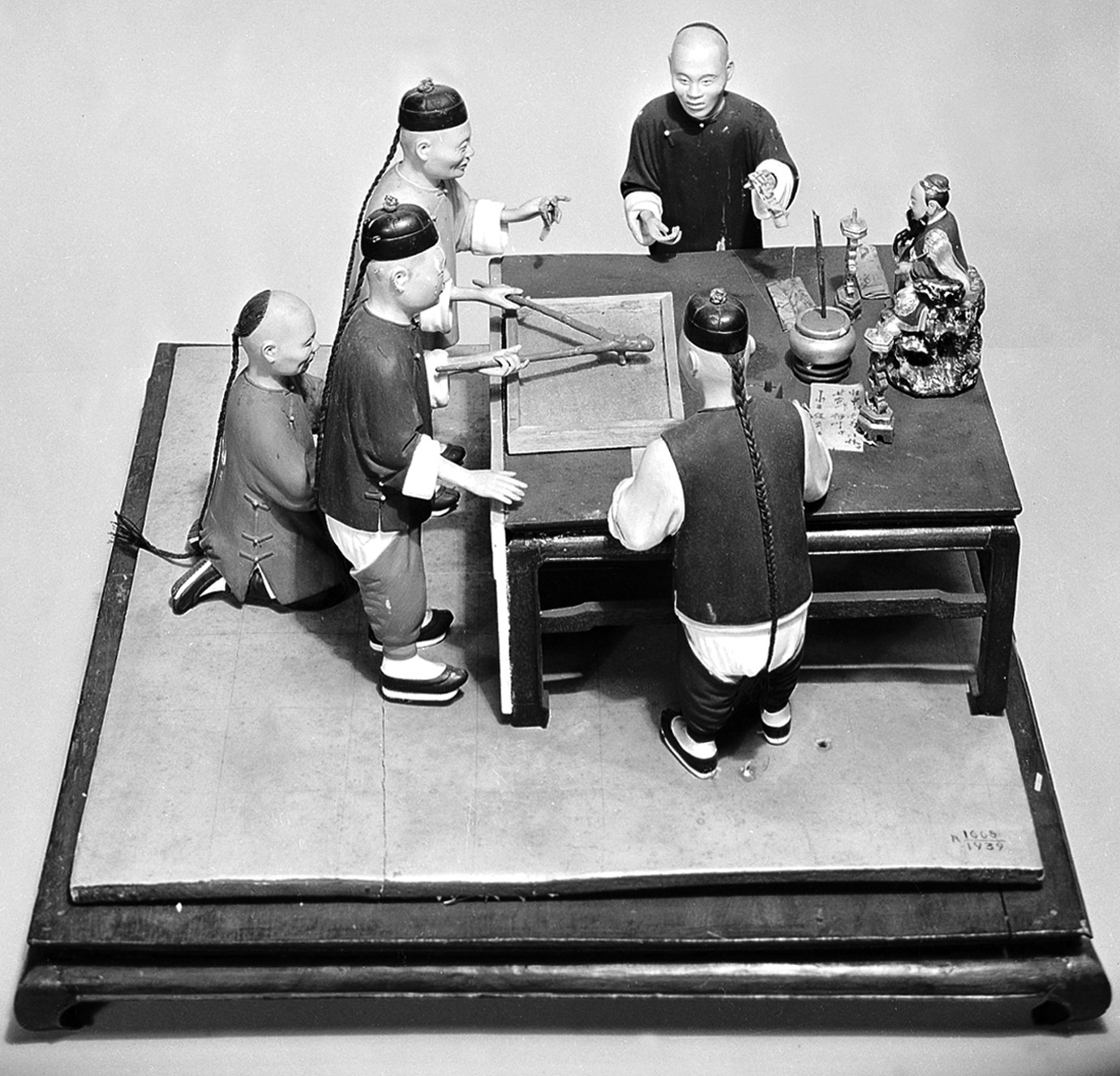
A model of a scene depicting divination

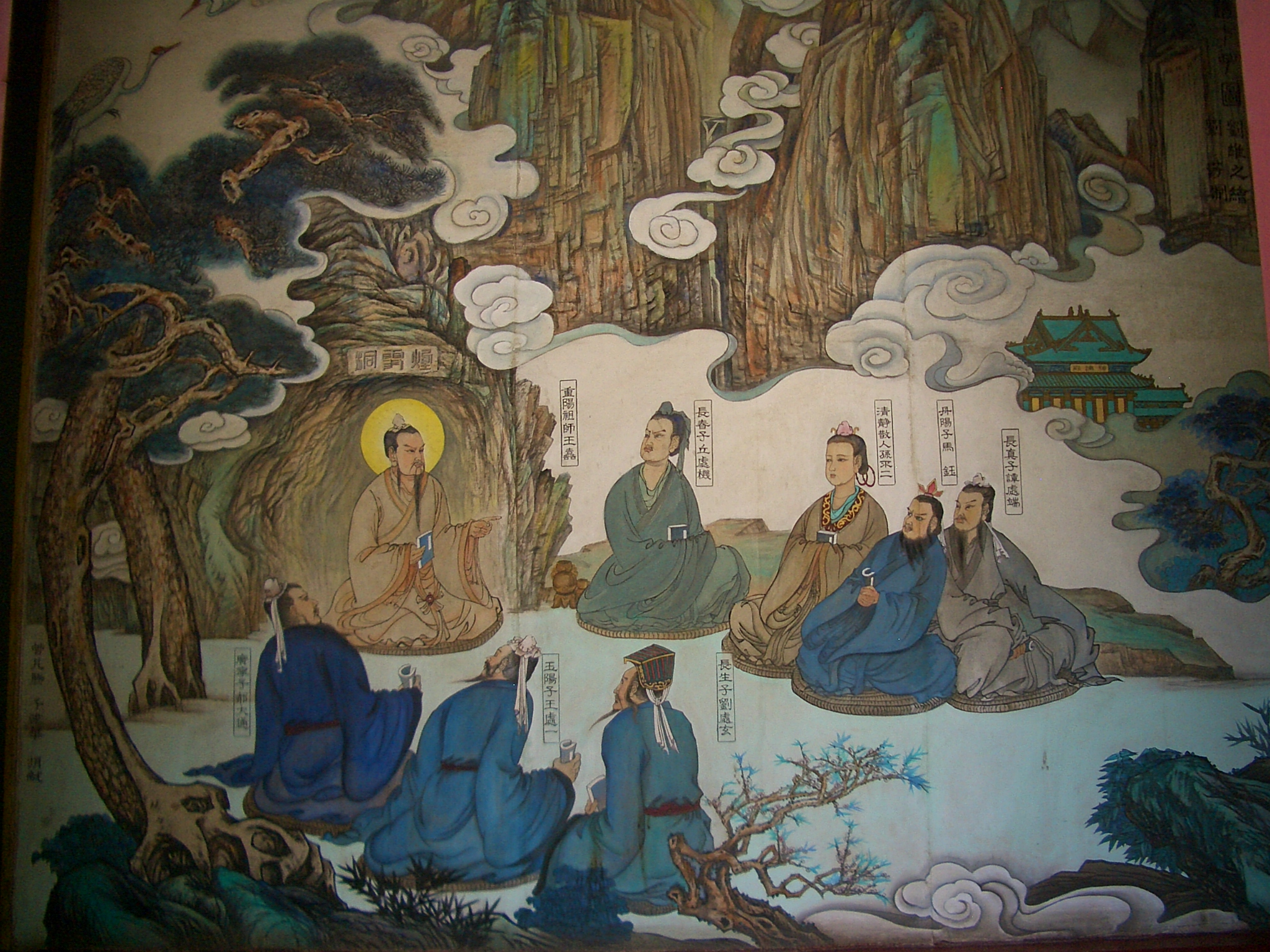
Wang Chongyang, founder of the Quanzhen School, depicted in Changchun Temple, Wuhan

Fuji writing, a form of automatic writing similar to the method later used by the Ouija board, was first recorded in China around 1100 AD. It was used as a method for contacting the spirit world. It was practiced by the Quanzhen School until the Qing dynasty forbade it.

The American Spiritualist movement began around 1848 notably when Fox sisters claimed to hear a spirit rapping in their home in Hydesville, New York. Séance circles would spell out messages with alphabet cards, pointing to one letter at a time and wait for a rap or a tilt of the table as a signal from the spirit world. The popular interest in "table-tipping" in the early 1850s set off a craze for devices designed to make this quicker. One of these was the planchette, invented in Paris, a small heart-shaped board on wheels that held a pencil. In 1886, spiritualist groups in northern Ohio began pairing modified planchettes with printed alphabets. Initially called the "New Planchette" and later the "talking board".

=== Kennard Novelty Company ===
By 1890 talking boards had become popular and investors sought to capitalize on the trend. The Kennard Novelty Company was incorporated in Baltimore, Maryland, on 30 October 1890 with its primary product a talking board. As background, the company went through a series of changes during its formative years involving the company officials. It had five incorporators: Charles Kennard, Washington Bowie, Harry Welles Rusk, William H. A. Maupin and John F. Green. Rusk was president, Bowie treasurer, and Kennard general manager; Bowie put up most of the starting capital. Elijah Bond, a Baltimore lawyer, applied for a patent on it on 28 May 1890, and US Patent 446,054, for a "toy or game", was issued on 10 February 1891, naming Bond as inventor and Kennard and Maupin as assignees. A story told by the Talking Board Historical Society recounts that the patent office turned the application down until the chief patent officer asked the board to spell his name, which it supposedly did.

According to the founders of Kennard Novelty Company, the board chose its name: asked what it wanted to be called, it spelled out O-U-I-J-A under the hands of Bond's sister-in-law, the medium Helen Peters Nosworthy. Kennard said the word was Egyptian for "good luck"; Fuld took credit for the name saying he had joined oui and ja, the French and German words for "yes".

Who invented the board was disputed for decades. Kennard claimed to have invented it with Bond, saying he had made a crude version from a cake board in 1886; however, drawings of the original Ohio boards published that year closely resemble the Ouija design. In 1920, at the height of the board's popularity, Kennard, Bond and several former employees each wrote to the Baltimore Evening Sun claiming to be its inventor. Dorian Cole of the Strong National Museum of Play rather names the Maryland cabinetmaker E. C. Reiche (d. 1899) as the most likely candidate.

=== Ouija Novelty Company and William Fuld ===
Kennard did not stay long at the company that carried his name. In 1891 or 1892, Bowie and Rusk reorganized the business and dismissed the other founders, Kennard among them. The Hustle describes Kennard and Maupin as having "cashed out" in 1892, although forced, willingly, or why, is unstated. On 8 March 1892 the company was renamed the Ouija Novelty Company and moved to 909 East Pratt Street. Bowie put William Fuld, a friend of his who had worked at the company as a varnisher, in charge of making the boards.

Kennard went on to make rival boards: the Volo, sold by the Northwestern Toy and Manufacturing Company, which he set up in Chicago in 1892, and the Igili, sold by the American Toy Company of Baltimore in 1897. Bowie and Fuld fought both with lawsuits, which ended Kennard's involvement in talking boards. Bond also left the company, after a failed attempt to run its factory in the United Kingdom.

William Fuld and his brother Isaac, who joined him in 1897, made the boards for the Ouija Novelty Company until 1901. That year the company gave William an exclusive agreement to produce the board, and Isaac was forced out, beginning a feud that lasted decades. William re-established the business as the William Fuld Manufacturing Company, and Isaac brought out a near-identical board he called the Oriole. William Fuld held the production rights and the Ouija trademark, which he defended in court against imitators, but he never held the patent. When the patent expired in 1908, Bond brought out a rival, the Nirvana board, and stated publicly that Fuld had "never had any title in said patent".

Fuld advertised himself as the "inventor and exclusive manufacturer" of the board. Asked by the Baltimore Sun in 1920 whether he believed in it, he replied: "I should say not. I'm no spiritualist. I'm Presbyterian." He died in 1927 after falling from the roof of his factory while supervising the installation of a flagpole, and his children carried on the business.

=== Popularity ===
In July 1913, Pearl Curran of St. Louis began receiving messages through the board from a spirit who called herself Patience Worth, a 17th-century Puritan Englishwoman. Over the next two decades Curran produced The Sorry Tale, six more books and thousands of poems. The public argued over whether Patience was a spirit or a part of Curran's own mind. Emily Grant Hutchings, an acquaintance of Curran, published Jap Herron (1917), which she said had been dictated by the late Mark Twain. Sales rose during World War I, as families tried to reach dead sons and husbands.

The board reached a height of popularity in 1920, with Fuld's largest factory at 1508 Harford Avenue plant. One writer that year said it produced "a national industry which bids fair to rival that in chewing gum", and the Baltimore Sun appointed an Ouija editor to keep up with readers' letters. Norman Rockwell painted a couple with a board across their knees for a 1920 cover of The Saturday Evening Post. Interest fell away in the late 1920s and revived after the attack on Pearl Harbor; by 1944 Macy's was selling thousands of boards.

=== Parker Brothers and Hasbro ===
The Fuld family made the board until 1966, when they sold the rights to Parker Brothers for about $975,000, according to a 1986 interview with the company's president. The following year Ouija outsold Parker Brothers' Monopoly. By the 1970s it became "the most feared spirit board in history", in part because of William Peter Blatty's popular 1971 novel The Exorcist that was based on a 1949 case in which a boy was said to have been possessed after using the board. The 1973 film version portrayed a girl playing with the board and later becoming possessed. Hasbro now owns it but as of 2024 does not regularly sell it. Hasbro has occasionally issued special editions tied to other media, for example the Stranger Things edition in 2017.

== Scientific investigation ==
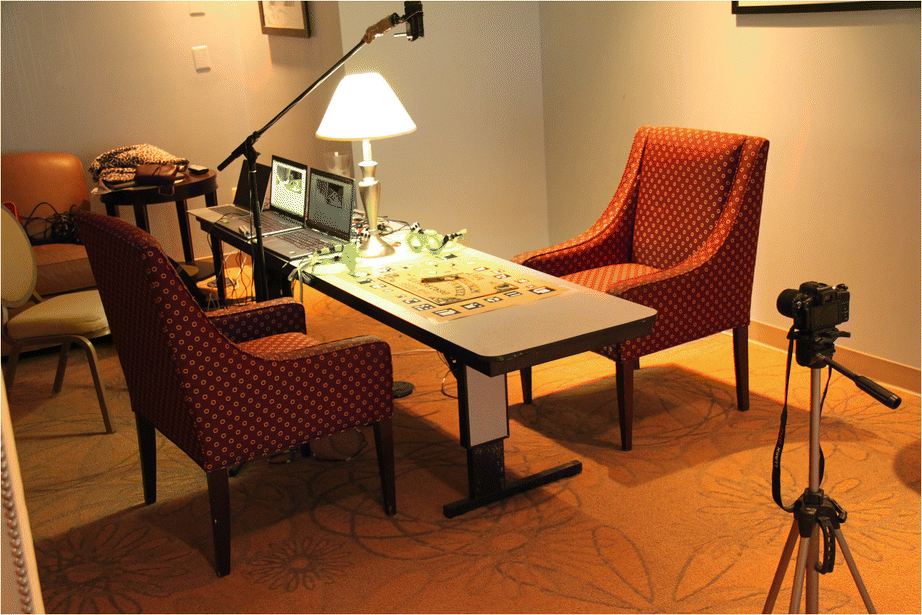
Experimental setup with eye tracking

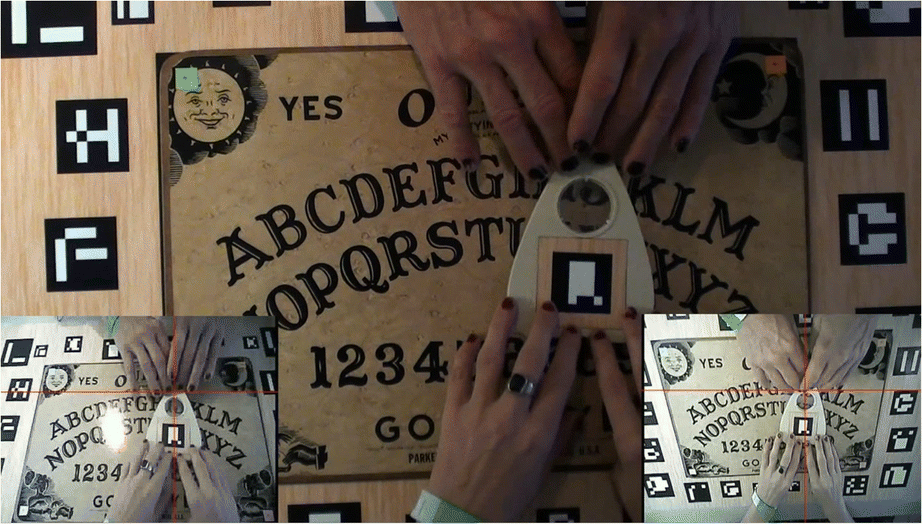
Video capture of experiment

The scientific community considers the Ouija phenomenon to be the result of the ideomotor phenomenon. Michael Faraday first described this effect in 1853, while investigating table-turning.

Various studies have been conducted, recreating the effects of the Ouija board in the lab and showing that, under laboratory conditions, the subjects were moving the planchette involuntarily. A 2012 study found that when answering yes or no questions, Ouija use was significantly more accurate than guesswork, suggesting that it might draw on the unconscious mind. Skeptics have described Ouija board users as "operators". Some critics have noted that the messages ostensibly spelled out by spirits were similar to whatever was going through the minds of the subjects such as where a knife was hidden in the room by one of the participants. In one study, researchers used cameras to monitor the eye movements of board users, noting eye direction predicted where the board would go in what the researchers called "voluntary conditions." According to professor of neurology Terence Hines in his book Pseudoscience and the Paranormal (2003):

The planchette is guided by unconscious muscular exertions like those responsible for table movement. Nonetheless, in both cases, the illusion that the object (table or planchette) is moving under its own control is often extremely powerful and sufficient to convince many people that spirits are truly at work ... The unconscious muscle movements responsible for the moving tables and Ouija board phenomena seen at seances are examples of a class of phenomena due to what psychologists call a dissociative state. A dissociative state is one in which consciousness is somehow divided or cut off from some aspects of the individual's normal cognitive, motor, or sensory functions.

Some involuntary movements are known as "Automatism".

This correlates with the ideomotor phenomenon because both rely on unconscious movement. The difference is that the ideomotor phenomenon is based on the idea that just the idea that something can happen tricks the brain into doing it. For example, thinking about not moving the planchette leads to the possibility of the planchette moving, which then makes someone unconsciously move the planchette. Studies also show a strong correlation between the action of the board and prior belief in its authenticity.

Ouija boards were already criticized by scholars early on, being described in a 1927 journal as "'vestigial remains' of primitive belief-systems" and a con to part fools from their money. Another 1921 journal described reports of Ouija board findings as 'half truths' and suggested that their inclusion in national newspapers at the time lowered the national discourse overall.

== Religious responses ==
Since early in the Ouija board's history, it has been criticized by several Christian denominations. The Catholic Church in the Catechism of the Catholic Church explicitly forbids any practice of divination, which includes the usage of Ouija boards. Catholic Answers, a Roman Catholic Christian apologetics organization, claims that "The Ouija board is far from harmless, as it is a form of divination (seeking information from supernatural sources)."

In 2005, Catholic bishops in the Chuuk State of the Federated States of Micronesia called for the boards to be banned and warned congregations that they were talking to demons when using Ouija boards The Catholic Church and the Wisconsin Evangelical Lutheran Synod both forbid its faithful from using Ouija boards as a violation of the Ten Commandments. Earlier in a 1995 pastoral letter, The Dutch Reformed Churches encouraged its communicants to avoid Ouija boards, as it is a practice "related to the occult".

In 2001, Ouija boards were burned in Alamogordo, New Mexico, by fundamentalist groups as "symbols of witchcraft". Religious criticism has expressed beliefs that the Ouija board reveals information which should only be in God's hands, and thus it is a tool of Satan. A spokesperson for Human Life International described the boards as a portal to talk to spirits and called for Hasbro to be prohibited from marketing them.

These religious objections to use of the Ouija board have given rise to ostension type folklore in the communities where they circulate. Cautionary tales that the board opens a door to evil spirits turn the game into the subject of a supernatural dare, especially for young people.

== Notable users ==
=== Literature ===
Ouija boards have been the source of inspiration for literary works, used as guidance in writing or as a form of channeling literary works. As a result of Ouija boards' becoming popular in the early 20th century, by the 1920s many "psychic" books were written of varying quality often initiated by Ouija board use.

- Emily Grant Hutchings claimed that her novel Jap Herron: A Novel Written from the Ouija Board (1917) was dictated by Mark Twain's spirit through the use of a Ouija board after his death
- Pearl Lenore Curran (1883–1937), alleged that for over 20 years she was in contact with a spirit named Patience Worth. This symbiotic relationship produced several novels, and works of poetry and prose, which Pearl Curran claimed were delivered to her through channelling Worth's spirit during sessions with a Ouija board, and which works Curran then transcribed
- Much of William Butler Yeats's later poetry was inspired, among other facets of occultism, by the Ouija board
- In late 1963, Jane Roberts and her husband Robert Butts started experimenting with a Ouija board as part of Roberts' research for a book on extra-sensory perception. According to Roberts and Butts, on 2 December 1963, they began to receive coherent messages from a male personality (an "energy personality essence no longer focused in the physical world") who eventually identified himself as "Seth", culminating in a series of books dictated by "Seth"
- In 1982, poet James Merrill released an apocalyptic 560-page epic poem titled The Changing Light at Sandover, which documented two decades of messages dictated from the Ouija board during séances hosted by Merrill and his partner David Noyes Jackson. Sandover, which received the National Book Critics Circle Award in 1983, was published in three volumes beginning in 1976. The first contained a poem for each of the letters A through Z, and was called The Book of Ephraim. It appeared in the collection Divine Comedies, which won the Pulitzer Prize for Poetry in 1977. According to Merrill, the spirits ordered him to write and publish the next two installments, Mirabell: Books of Number in 1978 (which won the National Book Award for Poetry) and Scripts for the Pageant in 1980.

=== Aleister Crowley ===
Aleister Crowley had great admiration for the use of the ouija board and it played a passing role in his magical workings. Jane Wolfe, who lived with Crowley at Abbey of Thelema, also used the Ouija board. She credits some of her greatest spiritual communications to use of this implement. Crowley also discussed the Ouija board with another of his students, and the most ardent of them, Frater Achad (Charles Stansfeld Jones): it is frequently mentioned in their unpublished letters. In 1917 Achad experimented with the board as a means of summoning Angels, as opposed to Elementals. In one letter Crowley told Jones:

Your Ouija board experiment is rather fun. You see how very satisfactory it is, but I believe things improve greatly with practice. I think you should keep to one angel, and make the magical preparations more elaborate.

Over the years, both became so fascinated by the board that they discussed marketing their own design. Their discourse culminated in a letter, dated 21 February 1919, in which Crowley tells Jones,

Re: Ouija Board. I offer you the basis of ten percent of my net profit. You are, if you accept this, responsible for the legal protection of the ideas, and the marketing of the copyright designs. I trust that this may be satisfactory to you. I hope to let you have the material in the course of a week.

In March, Crowley wrote to Achad to inform him, "I'll think up another name for Ouija". But their business venture never came to fruition and Crowley's new design, along with his name for the board, has not survived. Crowley has stated, of the Ouija Board, that

There is, however, a good way of using this instrument to get what you want, and that is to perform the whole operation in a consecrated circle, so that undesirable aliens cannot interfere with it. You should then employ the proper magical invocation in order to get into your circle just the one spirit you want. It is comparatively easy to do this. A few simple instructions are all that is necessary, and I shall be pleased to give these, free of charge, to any one who cares to apply.

=== Others ===
- Roland Doe used a Ouija board, which the Catholic Church stated led to his possession by a demon
- Dick Brooks, of the Houdini Museum in Scranton, Pennsylvania, uses a Ouija board as part of a paranormal and seance presentation
- G. K. Chesterton used a Ouija board in his teenage years
  - Around 1893, he had gone through a crisis of scepticism and depression, and during this period Chesterton experimented with the Ouija board and grew fascinated with the occult
- Bill Wilson, the co-founder of Alcoholics Anonymous, used a Ouija board and conducted seances in attempts to contact the dead
- Early press releases stated that Vincent Furnier's stage and band name "Alice Cooper" was agreed upon after a session with a Ouija board, during which it was revealed that Furnier was the reincarnation of a 17th-century witch with that name. Alice Cooper later revealed that he just thought of the first name that came to his head while discussing a new band name with his band
- Former Italian Prime Minister Romano Prodi claimed under oath that, in a séance held in 1978 with other professors at the University of Bologna, the "ghost" of Giorgio La Pira used a Ouija to spell the name of the street where Aldo Moro was being held by the Red Brigades
  - According to Peter Popham of The Independent: "Everybody here has long believed that Prodi's Ouija board tale was no more than an ill-advised and bizarre way to conceal the identity of his true source, probably a person from Bologna's seething far-left underground whom he was pledged to protect."
- The Mars Volta wrote their album Bedlam in Goliath (2008) based on their alleged experiences with a Ouija board
  - According to their story (written for them by a fiction author, Jeremy Robert Johnson), Omar Rodriguez Lopez purchased one while traveling in Jerusalem. At first the board provided a story which became the theme for the album. Strange events allegedly related to this activity occurred during the recording of the album: the studio flooded, one of the album's main engineers had a nervous breakdown, equipment began to malfunction, and Cedric Bixler-Zavala's foot was injured. Following these bad experiences the band buried the Ouija board
- In the murder trial of Joshua Tucker, his mother insisted that he had carried out the murders while possessed by the Devil, who found him when he was using a Ouija board
- In London in 1994, convicted murderer Stephen Young was granted a retrial after it was learned that four of the jurors had conducted a Ouija board séance and had "contacted" the murdered man, who had named Young as his killer. Young was convicted for a second time at his retrial and jailed for life
- E. H. Jones and C. W. Hill, whilst prisoners of the Turks during the First World War, used a Ouija board to convince their captors that they were mediums as part of an escape plan

== In popular culture ==
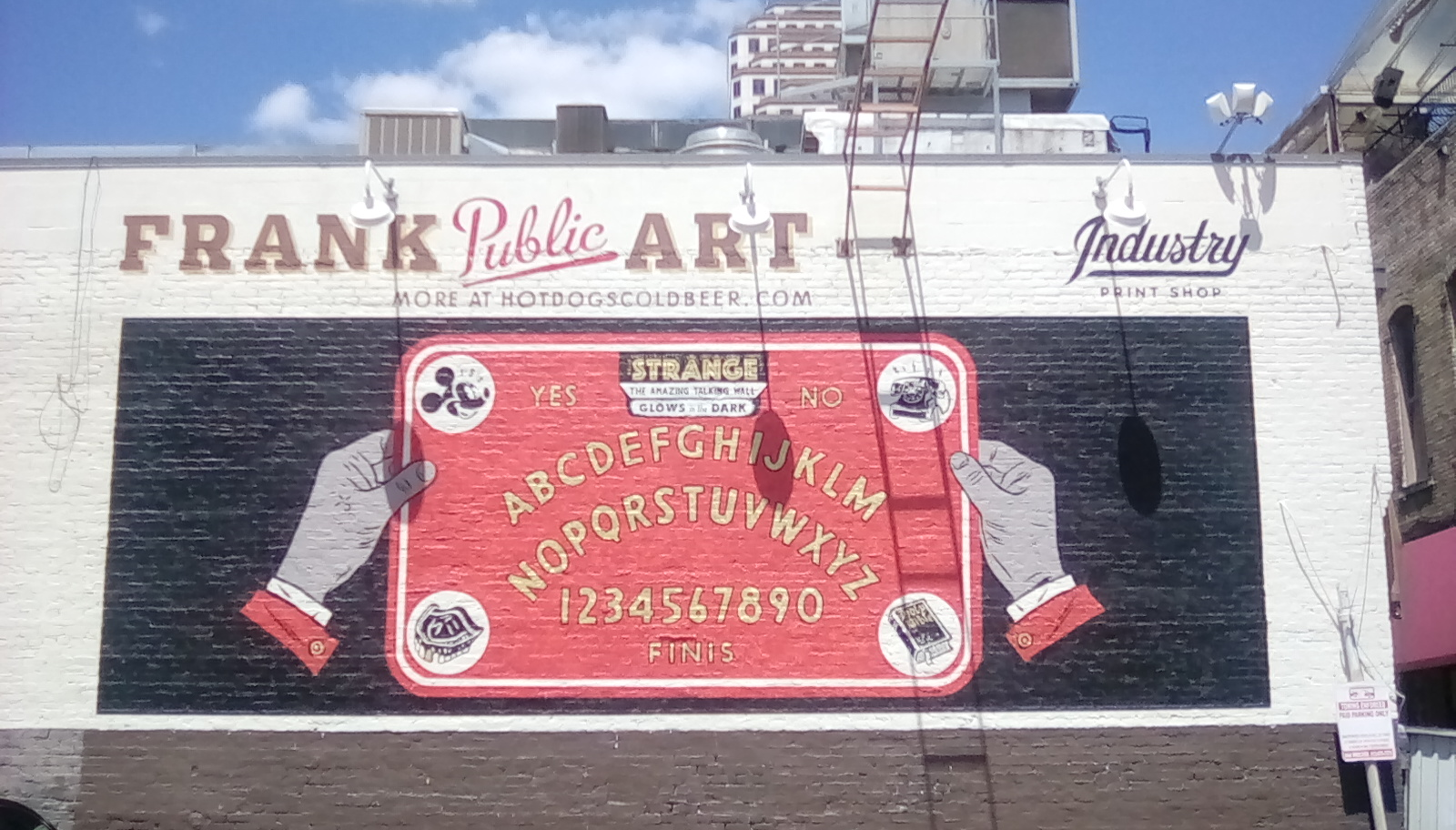
Ouija board painted on a two-story building in downtown Austin, Texas

Ouija boards have figured prominently in horror tales in various media as devices enabling malevolent spirits to scare their users.

In the 1919 American comedy film When the Clouds Roll By, Douglas Fairbanks asks his board: "Ouija - can two live as cheaply as one?"

In the 1960 supernatural horror film 13 Ghosts, the Zorba family plays the game "Ouija, the mystifying oracle".

Episodes of Lost in Space ("Ghost in Space" (1966)) and The Waltons ("The Ghost Story" (1974)) have spirit boards as part of their plots.

A Ouija board is an early part of the plot of the 1973 horror film The Exorcist. Using a Ouija board the young girl Regan makes what first appears to be harmless contact with an entity named "Captain Howdy". She later becomes possessed by a demon.

Based on Ouija Board, a song and album of the name, Ojah Awake, by Osibisa, was released in 1976.

The 1986 film Witchboard and its sequels center on the use of Ouija. The 1991 film And You Thought Your Parents Were Weird features use of a Ouija board in an important early scene. What Lies Beneath (2000) includes a séance scene with a board. Paranormal Activity (2007) involves a violent entity haunting a couple that becomes more powerful when the Ouija board is used.

Since the early 1990s, Metallica guitarist Kirk Hammett has used several guitars featuring Ouija board graphics on the body of the guitar itself. These have been produced by both ESP and their subsidiary LTD.

Aparichithan (The Stranger) is a 2004 Indian Malayalam-language horror film. The plot centers around a Ouija board and spiritualism.

Another 2007 film, Ouija, depicted a group of adolescents whose use of the board causes a murderous spirit to follow them. In 2011, The Ouija Experiment portrayed a group of friends whose use of the board opens, and fails to close, a portal between the worlds of the living and the dead. The 2012 film I Am Zozo follows a group of people that run afoul of a demon, based on Pazuzu, after using a Ouija board. The 2014 film Ouija features a group of friends whose use of the board prompts a series of deaths. A 2016 prequel, Ouija: Origin of Evil, also features the device.

Romancham (Goosebumps) is a 2023 Malayalam-language horror-comedy film. The plot involves several bachelors from Bangalore who improvise a Ouija board from a Carrom game.

The British singer Morrissey released a controversial single titled "Ouija Board, Ouija Board" in 1989. The lyrics and the video of the song mockingly play with the idea of supernaturally contacting dead persons.

The rap group Bone Thugs-n-Harmony referted to Ouija on their Horrorcore albums Creepin on ah Come Up and E. 1999 Eternal, having been inspired by seeing the board at Toys "R" Us.

Jeremy Gans's 2017 nonfiction book, The Ouija Board Jurors: Mystery, Mischief and Misery in the Jury System, based on an article he wrote for the University of Melbourne, recounts an incident in which four jurors sought the help of a Ouija board during a double murder trial, both for guidance and to relieve the stress precipitated by the brutal images of evidence.

The National Geographic show Brain Games Season 5 episode "Paranormal" clearly showed the board did not work when all participants were blindfolded.

The sitcom Steptoe and Son in Series 8 Episode 6, includes a scene with a Ouija board where Harold briefly fools Albert into believing that they are in contact with the ghost of Adolf Hitler.

Ouija boards appear in the video game Phasmophobia as an item investigators can use to communicate with the ghost, although using it can prove dangerous.

Ouija Board ( ওইজা বোর্ড ) is a Bangladeshi television drama directed by Humayun Ahmed and starring Bipasha Hayat, Shila Ahmed, Al Monsoor, Dilara Zaman, Abul Hayat and others.

The novel The Stand by Stephen King features a Ouija board (referred to only as a planchette) as a plot device.

== See also ==
- Alien hand syndrome – Neuropsychiatric disorder
- Automatic writing – Claimed psychic ability
- Bicameral mentality – Hypothesis in psychology
- Bunshinsaba (2004 film)
- Charlie Charlie challenge – Divination game
- Divided consciousness
- Dowsing – Pseudoscientific attempts to locate underground objects
- Dual consciousness – Hypothetical concept in neuroscience
- Fuji (planchette writing) – Method of planchette writing originated in China
- Gope boards – Papua New Guinean tribal art
- Kokkuri – Japanese game
- Left brain interpreter – Neuropsychological concept
- List of topics characterized as pseudoscience
- O-mikuji – Fortunes written on paper at shrines and temples in Japan
- Planchette – Wood paddle used in spiritualist activities
- Tengenjutsu (fortune telling) – Traditional Japanese fortune-telling method
