= Elijah Bond =

American inventor and lawyer (1847–1921)

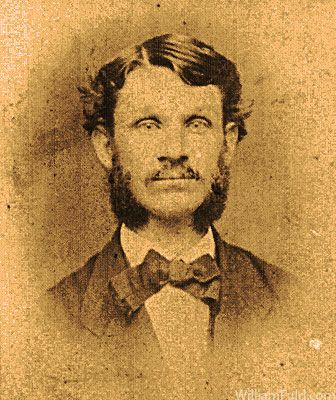
- Born: Elijah Jefferson Bond; January 23, 1847; Bel Air, Maryland, U.S.
- Died: April 14, 1921 (aged 74); Baltimore, Maryland, U.S.
- Resting place: Green Mount Cemetery; Baltimore, Maryland, U.S.
- Education: University of Maryland School of Law
- Occupations: Lawyer; inventor
- Known for: patenting of the ouija board
- Spouse: Mary Peters
- Children: 1
- Military career
- Allegiance: Confederate States of America
- Branch: Confederate States Army
- Conflicts: American Civil War

Elijah Jefferson Bond (January 23, 1847 – April 14, 1921) was an American lawyer and inventor. He is best known for patenting the ouija board.

== Early life ==
Elijah Jefferson Bond was born on January 23, 1847, in Bel Air, Maryland, to Charlotte Howard (née Richardson) and William B. Bond. His father was a judge. Bond graduated from the University of Maryland School of Law.

== Career ==
Bond served in the Confederate States Army during the American Civil War. He worked as a lawyer in Baltimore until around 1918.

=== Inventions ===
Although he invented and patented items, including a steam boiler, he is best remembered for patenting what became known as the Ouija board. He filed for a United States patent on May 28, 1890. Charles W. Kennard and William H. A. Maupin were listed as assignees. The patent was granted on February 3, 1891. Bond assigned the US distribution rights for the Ouija board to the Kennard Novelty Company.

Who invented the board has been disputed. See Ouija#History for the complex history. Claimants include Charles Kennard, William Fuld, several former employees of the board manufacturing company, and Maryland cabinetmaker E. C. Reiche, who researcher Dorian Cole of the Strong National Museum of Play considers the most likely candidate. Nevertheless, Bond maintained that he was the inventor.

Who named the board, what the name means, and how the name was chosen, remains a matter of dispute. See Ouija#Etymology. One story holds that Bond's sister-in-law, the medium Helen Peters Nosworthy, asked the board what they should name it, and the board spelled out "Ouija". When she asked the board what the word meant, the answer she found was "good luck". In a further mystery to the name's origin, Nosworthy later acknowledged that during the reading she had been wearing a locket with a picture of English author "Ouida". The first floor of the building where the séance took place is today a 7-Eleven convenience store. A plaque commemorating Bond and the Ouija board is installed inside the store.

=== Swastika Novelty Company ===
By the mid-1890s William Fuld gained control of the Baltimore company that made the Ouija board and successfully stopped imitators on trademark grounds. Bond left the company, after a failed attempt to run its factory in the United Kingdom. By 1907 Bond had relocated to West Virginia where he established the Swastika Novelty Company. The patent for Oiuja expired in January 1908, and Bond's new company began producing a knock-off of the original Ouija called the "Nirvana". The Swastika Novelty Company was a U.S. corporation that was incorporated on June 1, 1907, and dissolved on December 30, 2014. The company status was revoked after failure to file an annual report. The company's officers were Bond, E. T. Crawford and J. E. Crawford.

== Personal life ==
Bond married Mary Peters of Baltimore. They had at least one son, William B. Bond.

Bond died on April 14, 1921, at the home of his son at 3304 Clifton Avenue in Baltimore. He was buried in Baltimore's Green Mount Cemetery. In 2007, his grave marker was replaced with a custom headstone resembling a Ouija board.

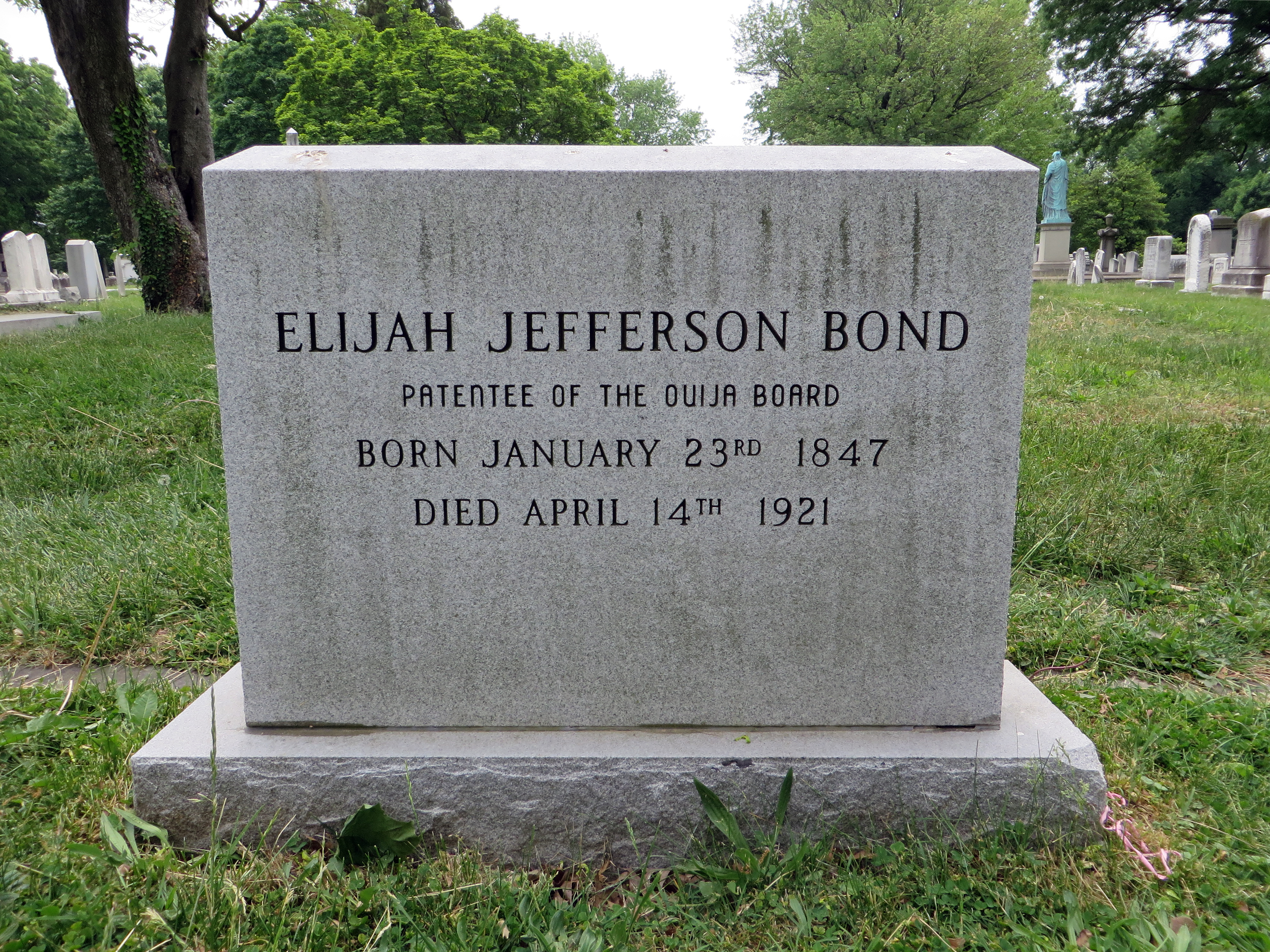
Gravestone front detail

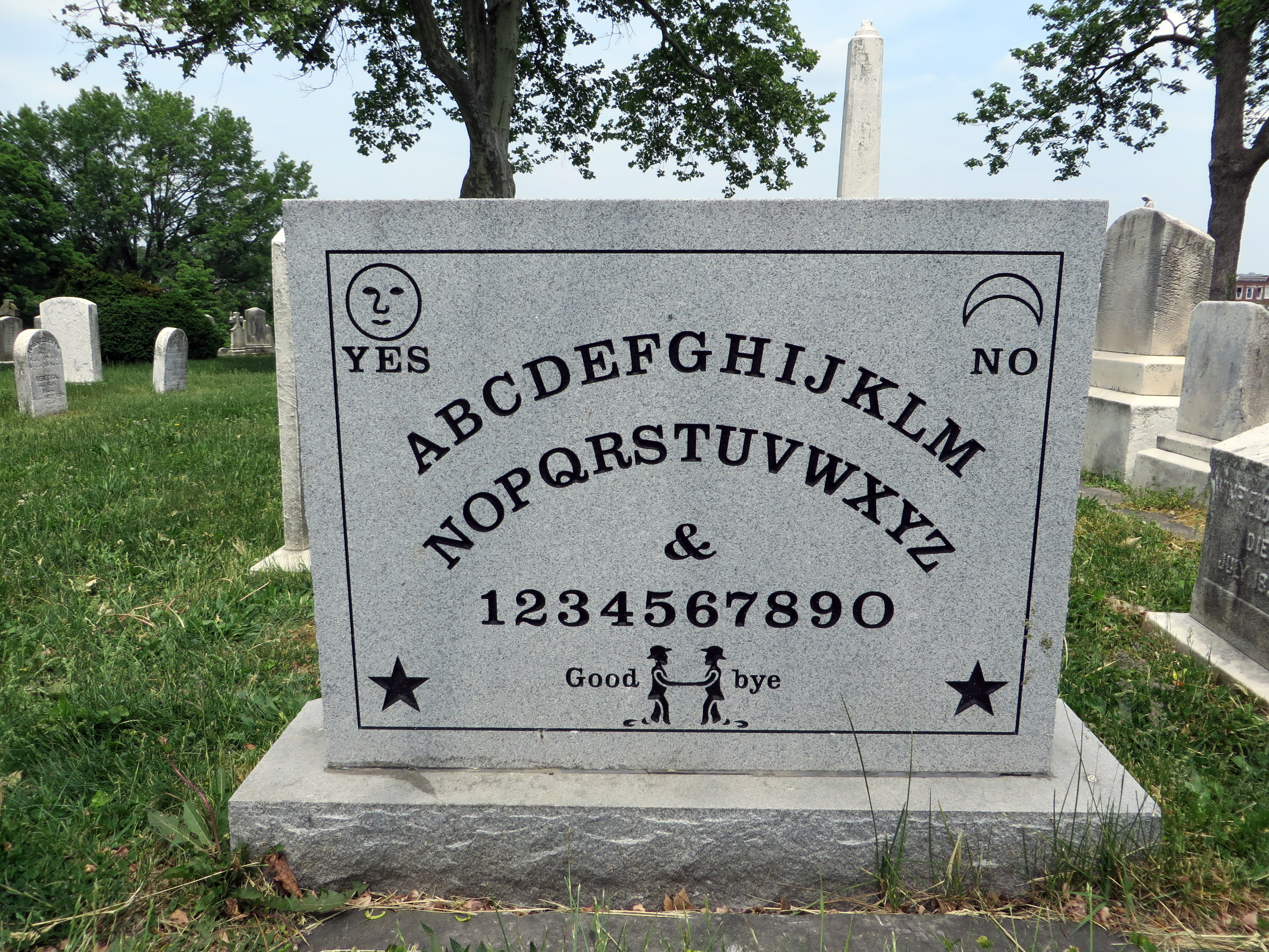
Gravestone rear detail

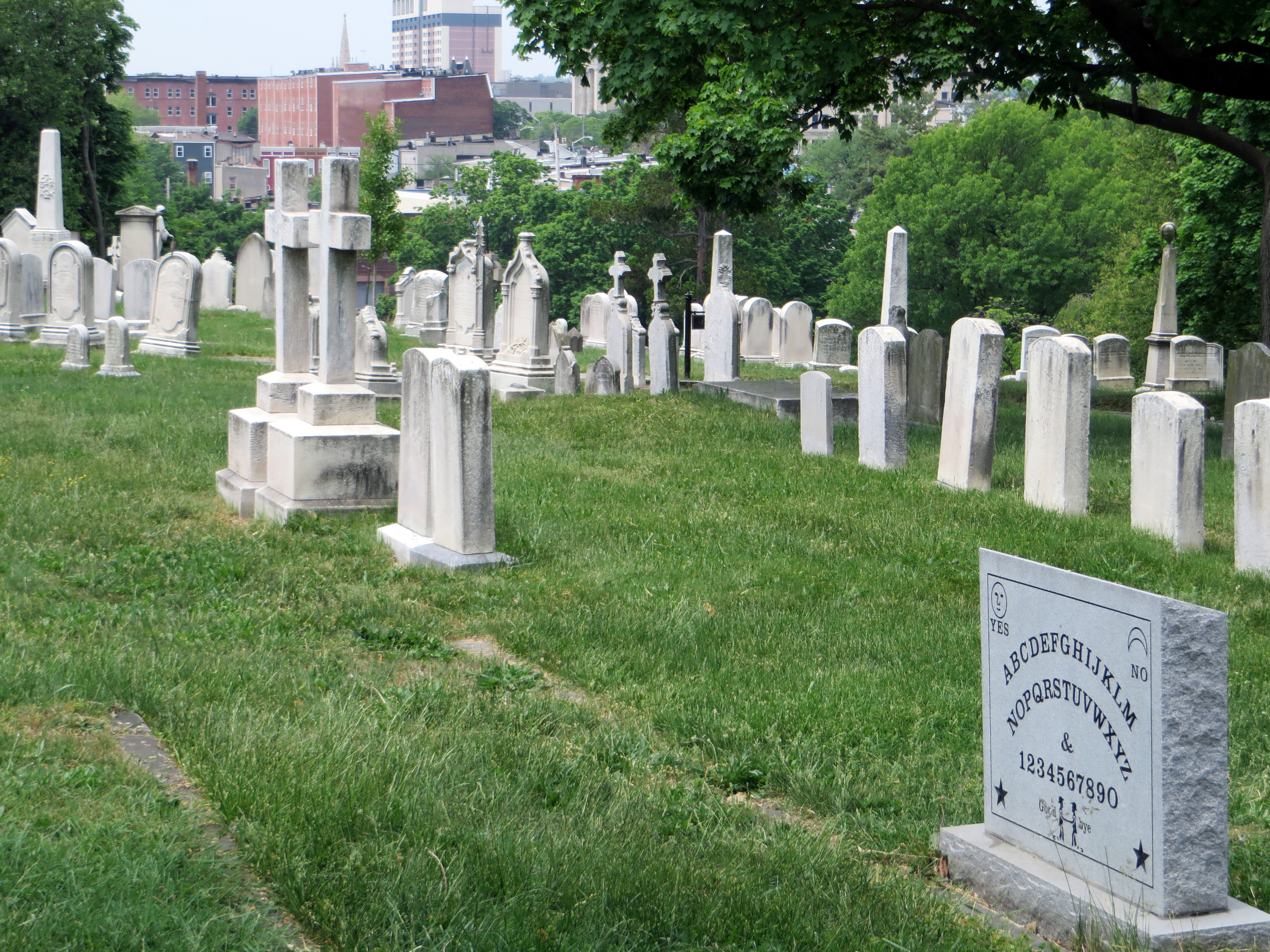
Gravestone rear three quarter

== Bibliography ==
- Gruss, Edmund (1994), The Ouija Board: Horror of Reality, New York: P&R Publishing, pp. 13–15

== Sources ==
- US Expired - Lifetime grant 446,054A, E. J. Bond, "Toy or game", issued February 10, 1891
- Official website
  - "Elijah Bond". William Fuld. Biography.
