= Jaap =

Jaap may refer to:

- Jaap (given name), Dutch given name (short for "Jacob")
- Johnny Jaap (1895–1974), Scottish-American soccer player
- Jaap, protagonist of the Dutch version of Bobo (Belgian comic)
