= Alexander Hay Japp =

Scottish author, journalist and publisher (1837–1905)

Alexander Hay Japp (26 December 1836 – 29 September 1905) was a Scottish author, journalist and publisher.

== Life ==
Born at Dun, Angus, on 26 December 1836, he was youngest son of Alexander Japp, a carpenter, by his wife Agnes Hay. After his father's early death, the mother and her family moved to Montrose, where he was educated at Milne's school. At seventeen Japp became a book-keeper with Messrs. Christie and Sons, tailors, at Edinburgh. Three years later he moved to London, and for two years was employed in the East India department of Smith, Elder and Co.

Returning to Scotland in poor health, he worked for Messrs. Grieve and Oliver, Edinburgh hatters, and in his leisure in 1860–1 attended classes at the university in metaphysics, logic, and moral philosophy. He became a double prizeman in rhetoric, and received from Professor William Edmondstoune Aytoun a special certificate of distinction; but he did not graduate.

At Edinburgh Japp associated with young artists, including John Pettie and his friends. Turning to journalism, he edited the Inverness Courier and the Montrose Review. Having settled in London in 1864, he joined The Daily Telegraph for a short time. While writing for other papers, he acted as general literary adviser to the publishing firm of Alexander Strahan (later William Isbister &Co.), and assisted in editing their periodicals: Good Words, Sunday Magazine (from 1869 to 1879), and The Contemporary Review from 1866 to 1872, while Henry Alford was editor. He also assisted Robert Carruthers in the third edition of Chambers's Cyclopædia of English Literature.

In October 1880, Japp started as a publisher, under the style Marshall Japp and Co., at 17 Holborn Viaduct; but bad health and insufficient capital led him to make the venture over to T. Fisher Unwin in 1882. From that year to 1888 he was literary adviser to the firm of Hurst and Blackett. From 1884 till 1900 he lived at Elmstead, near Colchester, where he cultivated his taste for natural history. After three years in London he finally settled at Coulsdon, Surrey, in September 1903. There, busy to the last, he died on 29 September 1905, and was buried in Abney Park cemetery. He was made LL.D. of Glasgow University in 1879, and in 1880 was elected Fellow of the Royal Society of Edinburgh.

== Relationship with Stevenson ==
Japp's interest in Henry Thoreau brought him the acquaintance of Robert Louis Stevenson. The two men met at Braemar in August 1881, and Japp's conversation attracted Stevenson and his father. Stevenson read to Japp the early chapters of Treasure Island, then called The Sea Cook, and Japp negotiated its publication in Young Folks. Subsequently Stevenson and Japp corresponded on intimate terms; and Japp's last work, Robert Louis Stevenson: a Record, an Estimate, and a Memorial (1905), was the result of their contacts.

== Works ==
Japp was versatile and prolific writer, writing under pseudonyms such as "H. A. Page", "A. F. Scot", "E. Conder Gray", and "A. N. Mount Rose" as well as in his own name. In his own name he issued in 1865 Three Great Teachers of our own Time: Carlyle, Tennyson, and Ruskin, which Ruskin found perceptive. He issued a selection of Thomas de Quincey's Posthumous Works (vol. i. 1891; vol. ii. 1893) and De Quincey Memorials: being Letters and other Records here first published (1891).

As "H. A. Page" he published:

- The Memoir of Nathaniel Hawthorne (1872; with several uncollected contributions to American periodicals);
- an analytical Study of Thoreau (1878); and
- his major work, De Quincey: his Life and Writings, with Unpublished Correspondence (supplied by De Quincey's daughters) (2 vols. 1877; 2nd edit. 1879, revised edit. in one vol. 1890).

Japp tried many genres. Under a double pseudonym he issued in 1878 Lights on the Way (by "the late J. H. Alexander, B.A.", with explanatory note by "H. A. Page"), which was semi-autobiographical fiction. There followed:

- German Life and Literature (1880; studies of Lessing, Goethe, Moses Mendelssohn, Herder, Novalis, and other writers);
- Hours in my Garden, and Other Nature-Sketches (1893)
- three volumes of verse: The Circle of the Year: a Sonnet Sequence with Proem and Envoi (privately printed, 1893);
- Dramatic Pictures, English Rispetti, Sonnets and other Verses (1894);
- Adam and Lilith: a Poem in Four Parts (1899; by "A. F. Scot");
- Animal Anecdotes arranged on a New Principle (by "H. A. Page") (1887); it attempted to show that the faculties of certain animals differ in degree rather than in kind from those of men;
- Offering and Sacrifice: an Essay in Comparative Customs and Religious Development by "A. F. Scot" (1899);
- Some Heresies in Ethnology and Anthropology dealt with under his own name (1899);
- More Loose Links in the Darwinian Armour (1900);
- Our Common Cuckoo and Other Cuckoos and Parasitical Birds (1899), a criticism of the Darwinian view of parasitism; and
- Darwin Considered Mainly as Ethical Thinker (1901), criticism of the hypothesis of natural selection.

== Family ==
Japp married twice:

1. in 1863 Elizabeth Paul Falconer (died 1888), daughter of John Falconer of Laurencekirk in Kincardineshire;
2. Eliza Love, of Scottish descent.

There were seven children of the first marriage.
