= Brazilian Abolitionist Confederation =

Brazilian political organization

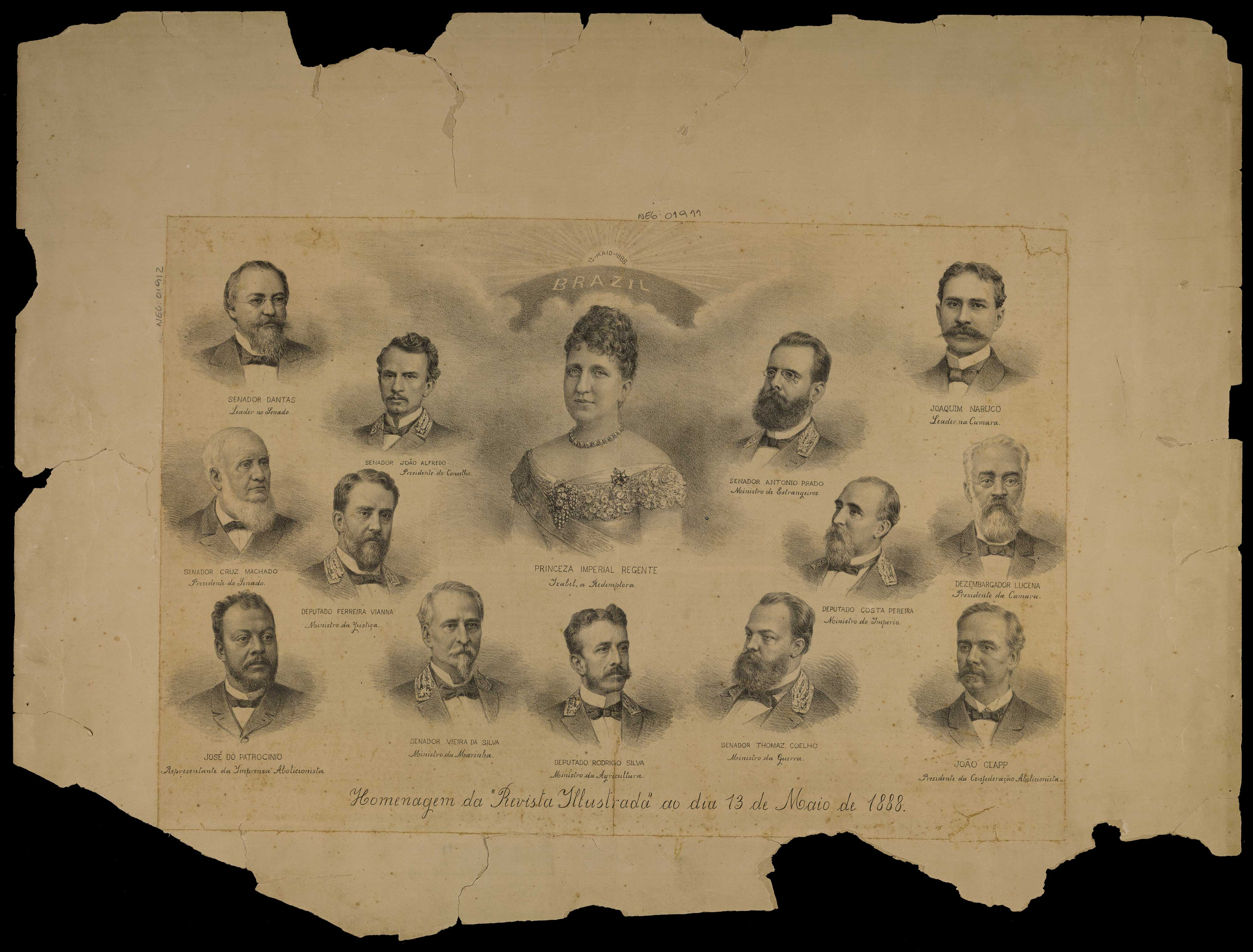
João Clapp, as president of the Abolitionist Confederation, in a press image about the João Alfredo Cabinet.

The Brazilian Abolitionist Confederation was a political organization created on May 9, 1883, which brought together anti-slavery societies from all over the Empire with the objective of pressuring the Brazilian government to put an end to slavery. It mainly used the press, theater, meetings, conferences and local emancipation funds as forms of activism. Some of the most famous leaders of the Brazilian Abolitionist Movement were involved in the organization, such as José do Patrocínio, Joaquim Nabuco, André Rebouças, Luiz Gama and João Clapp.

The institutionalization of the Abolitionist Confederation occurred within a political and economic context marked by strong international pressure to end slavery in Brazil. Although the subject had been in vogue since the late 1860s, it was only in the 1880s that the Abolitionist Movement gained strength. At this time, there was an increase in the circulation of activists, rhetoric and strategies through new technologies such as steamships and telegraph technology, which made it possible to spread political debates and experiences on an international scale and pushed various activists from different countries to build alliances or sociability networks. As a result, groups of people who shared the same interests developed, and over the years these associations began to work together to establish communication, resulting in the emergence of several national political associations. This model of properly structured collective action, known as associativism, was originally found in European countries such as England and France, and was used as a reference by Brazilian anti-slavery activists to build local activism in harmony with the subjectivities found in Brazil's national context and political tradition.

An adaptation made in Brazil can be noted regarding the meeting places, since in other countries, the groups met in churches, and in Brazil, most abolitionists gathered in theaters, which brought some characteristics to the movement, such as involvement with the arts, the dramatization of slavery and the theatricalization of politics. According to a survey carried out in the Almanak Laemmert, Cláudia Regina Andrade dos Santos demonstrates the expansion of associative life in Rio de Janeiro during the 1880s. According to her, the increase in the number of these institutions was strongly connected to the intensification of political debates and the political activism of Brazil's popular abolitionist sectors. She also states that the National Abolitionist Movement changed the field of politics through associations, creating clubs, societies, guilds and schools of different ideological, social and political hues. As a result, in 1883, the Abolitionist Movement succeeded in bringing together various organizations in a common program, known as Abolitionist Confederation.

The Brazilian Abolitionist Confederation was created at 6 p.m. on May 9, 1883, at a meeting organized at the headquarters of Gazeta da Tarde in Rio de Janeiro and was responsible for coordinating several anti-slavery associations and developing the Abolitionist Movement among the provinces of the Empire. It was also able to nationalize the campaign with its way of easily reproducing events and decisions, using public sessions, conferences and festivals. Its activities in newspapers, which published articles, pamphlets, essays, artistic productions, translations and manifestos, were responsible for enabling contact at national level between those who led the provinces and the others who took part in the movement. Before its creation, there were two other institutions fighting against slavery in Brazil: the Sociedade Brasileira Contra a Escravidão (English: Brazilian Society Against Slavery) and the Associação Central Emancipadora (English: Central Emancipation Association).

Initially, the societies that formed the Abolitionist Confederation were mostly student unions, but there was also a social variety, which included associations of printers, commercial employees and former slaves. Most of the organizations were located in the provinces of Rio de Janeiro, Pernambuco, Ceará, Rio Grande do Sul and Espírito Santo, but as time went by, they became more widespread in the territory. There were several historical figures among the anti-slavery groups that joined the Confederation who stood out for their work in the Abolitionist Movement, including Joaquim Nabuco, André Rebouças, Abílio Borges and Luiz Gama. The last three mentioned receive less prestige when the subject of abolition comes up, but their participation, even if independent, was fundamental to the development of political strategies in the Abolitionist Movement.

== Members of the Abolitionist Confederation ==
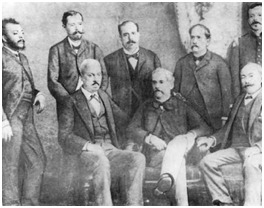
Photo of the board of the Abolitionist Confederation, May 16, 1888. Standing, from right to left: José do Patrocínio, Luís de Andrade, Inácio von Doellinger, Praxedes Medella and Luiz Pereira. Seated, from right to left: André Rebouças, João Clapp and José de Seixas Magalhães.

Abolitionism had several promoters, both regional and national, including Luiz Gama, who, according to Angela Alonso, was the person behind the articulation of judicial activism; Abílio Borges, who united national and international mobilization; José do Patrocínio, who coordinated the excellent strategies in the public arena; and André Rebouças, the most important articulator of the group, since he was an aristocrat and the son of a politician, which allowed him to circulate in public spaces, do business with employers and get close to students and theater professionals.

One of the greatest virtues of the Brazilian Abolitionist Movement is its diversity – differences in social position, status, region of origin, career, access to the political system among abolitionists – which, despite generating internal conflicts, enables the process of forming new alliances. A significant part of the activists had a lifestyle unrelated to slavery; they were part of the middle and lower sectors of the Empire's urban social stratum. With the end of the transatlantic slave trade and the rise of the interprovincial slave trade, the number of captives had become concentrated in areas of agricultural production and among wealthier families; civil servants, merchants and liberal professionals generally had few or no slaves. Abolitionists also included students, journalists, writers, artists, members of the army, commercial employees, printers, journeymen, among others.

Women took part in activism through philanthropy, organizing events and fundraisers, helping their husbands, fathers and brothers, and taking part in artistic performances. They also founded abolitionist societies, including Ave Libertas, which was formed in Recife. Angela Alonso states that throughout the abolitionist campaign, women were part of six mixed societies and 21 exclusively female societies. In general terms, this diversity boosted the number of people in the movement and made it possible to divide up activities, which proved to be unique but complementary styles of activism.

== Manifesto of the Abolitionist Confederation ==
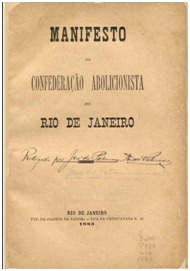
Cover of the Manifesto of the Abolitionist Confederation of Rio de Janeiro published by the Central Typography, Rio de Janeiro, 1883.

The Manifesto of the Abolitionist Confederation of Rio de Janeiro was written at a meeting of the Confederation on August 11, 1883, and signed by a group of abolitionist organizations. One of the manifesto's main points was that abolitionist propaganda was not a sentimental anarchist yearning or question, nor was it philosophical, but rather a presentation of the rights contained in parliamentary treaties. Within constitutional limits, abolitionist propaganda had the right to ask to be heard by the people's representatives. The intention of the document is to ensure that all the provinces and people of the Empire listen to what is being said, because according to the text, slave ownership is criminal, given that human freedom is fundamental for the three natural laws of social progress to operate: solidarity, competition and mutuality.

According to the manifesto, the city of Rio de Janeiro is the space that provides the debate over abolition, by uniting and opposing those interested in the issue from an economic, institutional and political perspective. At first, the text presents a history of slavery that began in the colonial period, showing the background to the enslavement of indigenous people and Africans in Brazil. The document also reports on other aspects of the history of the advances and setbacks made in the Empire's path towards abolition.

In the manifesto, freedom must be an essential and decisive principle in the organization of a society. In this political dispute, the Manifesto of the Abolitionist Confederation of Rio de Janeiro states that everyone should be free, affirming that equality and the right to freedom is everyone's right.

== Methods of activism ==
In the early days of its formation, the Brazilian Abolitionist Movement interacted with international movements and was inspired by their forms of action. However, given the specificities of the Brazilian scenario, the actions could not simply be transposed to Brazilian militancy. The Anglo-American model of mobilization guided the actions of the Brazilian movement, but unlike the US, for example, which had the support of the Protestant Church and organized its militancy in Quaker associations, in Brazil, a Catholic country, the Church was one of the state institutions, as was slavery. This scenario was similar to that of the Spanish colonies, Puerto Rico and Cuba, which were also going through the abolition process in the 1870s.

The Abolitionist Confederation formulated several strategies to win the fight against slavery, and one of the greatest resources used by the abolitionists was rhetoric, whose practice was introduced by the country's intellectual and political tradition through Portuguese educational institutions. According to the author Júlio César de Souza Dória, rhetoric was the structure of the Brazilian linguistic and political context in the 1880s. The presence of rhetorical elements in parliamentary speeches, streets, conferences and newspaper articles that circulated in the Empire show that the adoption of this discursive practice served as a way of organizing ideas, with the purpose of convincing the public and opponents of the cause. However, after 1885, the Abolitionist Movement, dissatisfied with the slow pace of the project to gradually abolish slavery, rebelled against the state, changing its peaceful orientation.

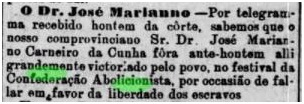
On January 14, 1984, a telegram from Rio de Janeiro reported that the Pernambuco abolitionist José Marianno Carneiro da Cunha, who had spoken out in favor of the freedom of slaves, had been acclaimed by the people of the Empire on January 13, 1984, at the Abolitionist Confederation festival.

According to Angela Alonso, there were three phases of the Brazilian Abolitionist Movement. The first took place between 1868 and 1871, when the first cycle of anti-slavery mobilization emerged in the Brazilian public arena, led by members of the imperial elite. The state's reaction to this early mobilization was tolerant, and these pioneering activists of the Abolitionist Movement managed to convey the movement's cause and strategy, even if their actions were not very active.

The second phase took place between 1872 and 1887. With the law in force, the departure of the Conservative Party from government and the arrival of the Liberals, there was a nationalization of mobilization and an intensification of abolitionist protests. Between 1884 and 1887, there were 896 pro-abolition mobilization events in Brazil, without support from other institutions, but also without state repression.

The third and final phase covers the 80s of the 19th century, characterized by the predominance of the Abolitionist Movement. The most radical confrontations between abolitionists and slaveholders took place during this period, mainly in 1885. In this context, the abolitionists used legal and extra-legal strategies to succeed in the end of slavery. In 1884, the movement became institutionalized and began to help the government with the gradual emancipation project. The opposition to the union between the government and the movement was considerable, and the group formed by slave owners showed its strength in the elections. In 1885, the final period of confrontational abolitionist mobilization occurred. After being expelled from the public arena, the movement began to break the law with direct actions.

=== Legal forms of activism ===
==== Press ====
The periodical press has been present in Portuguese America regularly since the 17th century, through publications from Portugal and other European countries. In Brazil, newspapers began to be produced in 1808 and were consolidated in 1821. During the 19th century, periodicals began to be published daily and consequently became an important source of information for Brazilian society. As a result, the Abolitionist Confederation used the press as an essential tool to build public opinion on slavery. Throughout the 1980s, the discussion about abolition became intensified and the positions against slavery became increasingly clear. During this period, the press served as a means of propagandizing abolitionist ideas, especially during the 1880s, with abolitionists defending their conceptions in debates against reactionary and conservative subjects.

Although there was a significant circulation of periodicals in the Empire, the type of publication that provided the greatest number of debates on abolition was the newspaper. Through them, activists gave greater visibility to the Abolitionist Movement, reporting on the progress of the abolitionist cause in Brazil. After 1885, the indignation of those opposed to slavery was reflected in the countless debates in the newspapers. One of their most powerful arguments was that slavery was the social backwardness of the country; this claim had a considerable impact on the public sphere, which formed its opinion on the cause. Even in the newspapers, the abolitionists constantly affirmed their actions against slavery, such as theatrical performances promoted to raise awareness of the cause, conferences and meetings and the collection of donations for local emancipation funds. One of the main abolitionist newspapers of the time was Gazeta da Tarde, founded in Rio de Janeiro in 1880 by Ferreira de Menezes and taken over in 1881 by José do Patrocínio, whose pages served as a platform for the enthusiastic speeches of several abolitionists. In addition to newspapers, abolitionists also spread their precepts through meetings (public and private), conferences and kermesses.

While the literate activists wrote their oratory in the newspapers and followed the heated debates in the news, the illiterate abolitionists consumed the famous cartoons with an anti-slavery message in Angelo Agostini's Revista Ilustrada. In addition to abolition, other issues were discussed in the press. One of the recurring subjects concerned the political structure of the Empire, where republicans and monarchists confronted their conceptions at the end of the 19th century, especially between 1888 and 1889. In addition, the forms and rules of abolitionist demonstrations to bring about popular mobilization were also discussed.

==== Theater ====
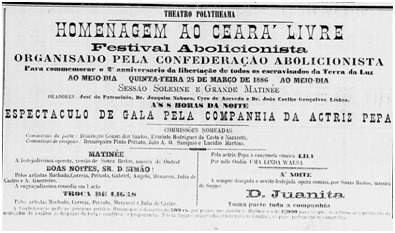
Announcement of an abolitionist festival in the form of a conference-concert to commemorate the abolition of Ceará, organized by the Abolitionist Confederation.

The educator Abílio Cesar Borges (1824–1891) pioneered the "Boomerang Method", which sought to put pressure on Brazilian institutions through international allies. He was also a pioneer in organizing civic ceremonies in the 1860s at his schools in Salvador and Rio de Janeiro, where anti-slavery speeches were made and students wrote and recited poems on the subject; one of whom was Castro Alves (1847–1871). During civic ceremonies at his abolitionist association Libertadora 7 de Setembro, which were the origin of the conferences-concerts of the 1880s, he received donations that allowed him to buy and distribute letters of freedom.

In the 19th century in Brazil, theaters were one of the main forms of entertainment and propagation of culture. Due to their popular reach among different classes, they became an important vehicle for disseminating the movement. According to Ricardo Tadeu Caires Silva, from 1850 onwards the theater began to receive a wider and more diverse audience, ceasing to be an exclusively elitist environment. Abolitionists such as Rebouças, who travelled around Europe in the 1870s, had contact with the anti-slavery conferences at the Theatro Variedades in Madrid, organized by the Spanish Abolitionist Society. Inspired by the actions of Spanish abolitionism, which made use of theaters in its propaganda, the Brazilian movement used this space not only as a meeting point to discuss its agendas, but also to provoke reflection in the audience. The first abolitionist show was organized by Vicente de Souza in 1879 at the São Luís Theatre. According to Angela Alonso, national mobilization increased after the abolition in Ceará in 1884, with a series of public actions by the Abolitionist Movement.

The theater shows promoted by the abolitionists brought a wider audience into contact with the movement's ideas than other activities. The program had a diverse repertoire, including the presentation of poetry, orchestras, conferences and the delivery of letters of freedom, which took place at the end of each event. Poetry and plays served to disseminate anti-slavery morals and sensitize the urban population to the abolitionist cause. Works such as the theatrical adaptation of Uncle Tom's Cabin by Harriet Beecher Stowe, and the poem Navio Negreiro by Castro Alves, were several times represented in the artistic repertoire of these events. The productions moved streetcar lines, which ran at special times to attend abolitionist events, and the small businesses around the theater on performance days. Commemorations and events that contributed to the liberation of slaves were brought to the theater, such as the Eusébio de Queiroz Law, the Free Womb Law and Abolition in Ceará.

At the end of the event, which combined an artistic performance with a political speech, the audience threw camellias, the flower symbol of the movement, onto the stage. Through art, Brazilian abolitionists raised public awareness of the problem of slavery. The concert-conferences were decisive for the growth of public acceptance of abolition and for joining the mobilization.

==== Meetings and conferences ====
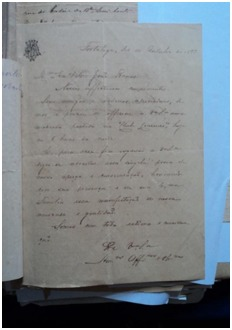
Letter from Fortaleza on October 20, 1883, addressed to Pernambuco abolitionist João Ramos. In the letter, the Clube Abolicionista Cearense invites João Ramos to take part in a meeting and says that the invitation is proof of its consideration for the abolitionist. At the time, João Ramos was president of the Clube do Cupim, an abolitionist society in Pernambuco affiliated to the Abolitionist Confederation. Source: Mário Melo Collection, IAHGP – Historical and Geographical Archaeological Institute of Pernambuco, 1883.

The National Abolitionist Movement transformed the field of politics through associations, creating clubs, societies, guilds and schools of different ideological, social and political hues. In 1883, the movement managed to bring together various organizations in a common program, known as Abolitionist Confederation.

The members of the Abolitionist Confederation were in constant communication through meetings, letters and telegrams. In this way, the clubs from different provinces that belonged to the Confederation functioned as a single entity. In the 1880s, the abolitionists formed a considerably strong group, capable of opposing the slave-owning elite of the time. In this context, meetings, conferences and gatherings formed the essential gear that kept the confederation communicating and brought organization and success to the movement's actions.

==== Emancipation funds ====
The Free Womb Law, enacted in 1871, established the creation of a national emancipation fund, a legal instrument created with the aim of raising resources to buy letters of freedom. The Emancipation Fund was made up of taxes on the transfer of slave property, the proceeds of six annual lotteries and a tenth of those granted to run in the national capital, fines imposed for non-compliance with the law, donations, and part of the general, provincial and municipal budgets. Within a decade, according to a survey by Evaristo de Moraes, the emancipation fund had succeeded in freeing only 1% of the slave population. Faced with the slow progress of the government's program for gradual emancipation, abolitionist associations created their own emancipation funds to finance a greater number of freedmen.

According to Castilho and Cowling, the practice of granting letters of freedom was crucial to the development of the Abolitionist Movement in the 1880s. While criticizing the inefficiency of the national emancipation fund, they used local emancipation funds to mobilize popular opinion. Abolitionists publicized the donations they received and the names of the donors in newspapers, and also invited enslaved people to submit petitions for manumission, which were usually made by the enslaved themselves at abolitionist society meetings. Unlike the national emancipation fund, the local emancipation funds were mainly raised through donations, concerts and fairs, with a broad donor base. Abolitionist associations used public ceremonies and concert-conferences to distribute letters of freedom as a way of advertising and encouraging donations to their respective emancipation funds.

In the early 1880s, as local emancipation funds became increasingly important, local governments set up their own funds as a way of taking control of the emancipation process. This was the case with the legislative assembly of Pernambuco in 1883, and the city councils of Recife and Rio de Janeiro in 1884. In the latter, the Golden Book was created with the aim of freeing all the enslaved people in the municipality. According to a survey by Castilho and Cowling (2013), between 1885 and 1887, the Golden Book freed 797 enslaved people in nine emancipation ceremonies. These ceremonies were held in the Paço Municipal on the birthdays of members of the royal family and the independence movement, which promoted not only the ideal of abolition, but also the royal family and the Rio de Janeiro City Council. Despite dividing opinions among members of the Abolitionist Movement, Castilho and Cowling claim that the Abolitionist Confederation and the Rio de Janeiro City Council collaborated in financing the purchase of freedoms. Finally, in the 1880s, the money from the emancipation funds was also used to finance two extralegal abolitionist practices: the harboring of enslaved people and the planning of escapes by captives.

==== Abolition in Ceará and Amazonas ====
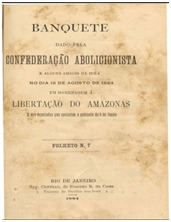
Cover of a pamphlet describing the banquet to commemorate the abolition of Ceará, offered by the Abolitionist Confederation. Source: Central Typography, 1884, Rio de Janeiro.

The Abolitionist Confederation sought to build alliances with the militancy of the provinces. Inspired by the "free territories" strategy of US abolitionism, the Confederation spearheaded a campaign to abolish slavery in Brazilian territories. According to Angela Alonso, the liberation campaign was only successful in territories where it was possible to combine the low political organization of local slavery, a facilitating provincial executive and a movement that was structured and connected to the court. From this combination, abolition was celebrated in Ceará on March 25, 1884, and in Amazonas on July 10 of the same year.

In the first half of the 1880s, Ceará and Rio de Janeiro were the main centers of activism, with 24 and 21 new abolitionist associations formed there respectively. In 1883, Sátiro de Oliveira Dias, a supporter of abolitionism, became president of the province of Ceará and implemented the emancipation fund in the province, as stipulated by the 1871 law. Then, on October 3, the Provincial Assembly approved the bill that increased the tax for every slave in the province and the tax for every slave that was exported; what was left of the enslaved was sold before the law came into force, as a profit strategy for the owners. From 1883 onwards, municipalities in Ceará gradually achieved the abolition of slavery. The confederation, as a strategy against a possible regression in the validity of Provincial Law No. 2,034 of October 19, 1883, published in the press and postponed the commemorations of the Abolition in Ceará to March 25. News of the state spread through the international press, and conferences and concerts were held to celebrate the achievement. Patrocínio and Nabuco organized events in Paris and London to publicize the feat and move foreign opinion in favour of the actions taken in Ceará. The actions of the raftsmen, who refused to transport enslaved people, were also important. This accelerated the discussion of liberation and inspired abolitionists. Among the raftsmen, their leader, Francisco José do Nascimento, is a symbol of resistance and affirms the contribution of black people to the abolition process in Brazil.

In Amazonas, the enslaved population was around 1,500 in the 1880s. Teodureto Carlos de Faria Souta, who took office in March 1884 and was also a supporter of abolitionism, followed in Dias' footsteps and approved the Amazonas Abolition Bill, Provincial Law No. 632, in April of the same year. The commemorations of the liberation in Amazonas were scheduled for May 24, 1884, and ceremonies were held following a model that was already widespread among the provinces, like the banquet offered by the Abolitionist Confederation on August 19, 1884, to commemorate the liberation of the state. The ceremony was attended by the president of Amazonas and Confederation leaders such as João Clapp, Rebouças, Patrocínio and Nabuco.

=== Illegal forms of activism ===
The social struggles against slavery that took place in the 1980s led Brazil to a climate of constant conflict which, along with the repercussions of the criticism of slavery widely disseminated by the Empire through the abolitionists, led to a feeling of repulsion in some people about the servile system. These struggles, however, were able to bring the slave system to its degradation by the end of the 19th century.

Before 1887, there were several abolitionist groups, some more conservative and others more radical. The conservatives did not support the fight for abolition with direct contact with slaves, while the more radicals fought for complete social reform in Brazil. In 1887, the Abolitionist Movement became unanimous, and according to Maria Helena Machado, after this period the abolitionists began to penetrate the senzalas, organizing mass escapes and the abandonment of the farms. From then on, the protest of the enslaved gained content and effective political direction.

After total abolition in the provinces of Ceará and Amazonas, interprovincial escapes became a strong strategy of abolitionists to free captives, like a Brazilian adaptation of the US Underground Railroads. At this time, the activists paid for several expenses, such as the accommodation of the enslaved person in the province where they were held captive, their escape to one of the provinces that had decreed abolition, the start of their stay in the new province and their new condition as a free person.

== See also ==
- Abolitionism in Brazil
- Golden Law
