= Ave Libertas Society =

Brazilian abolitionist association

- Sociedade Ave Libertas
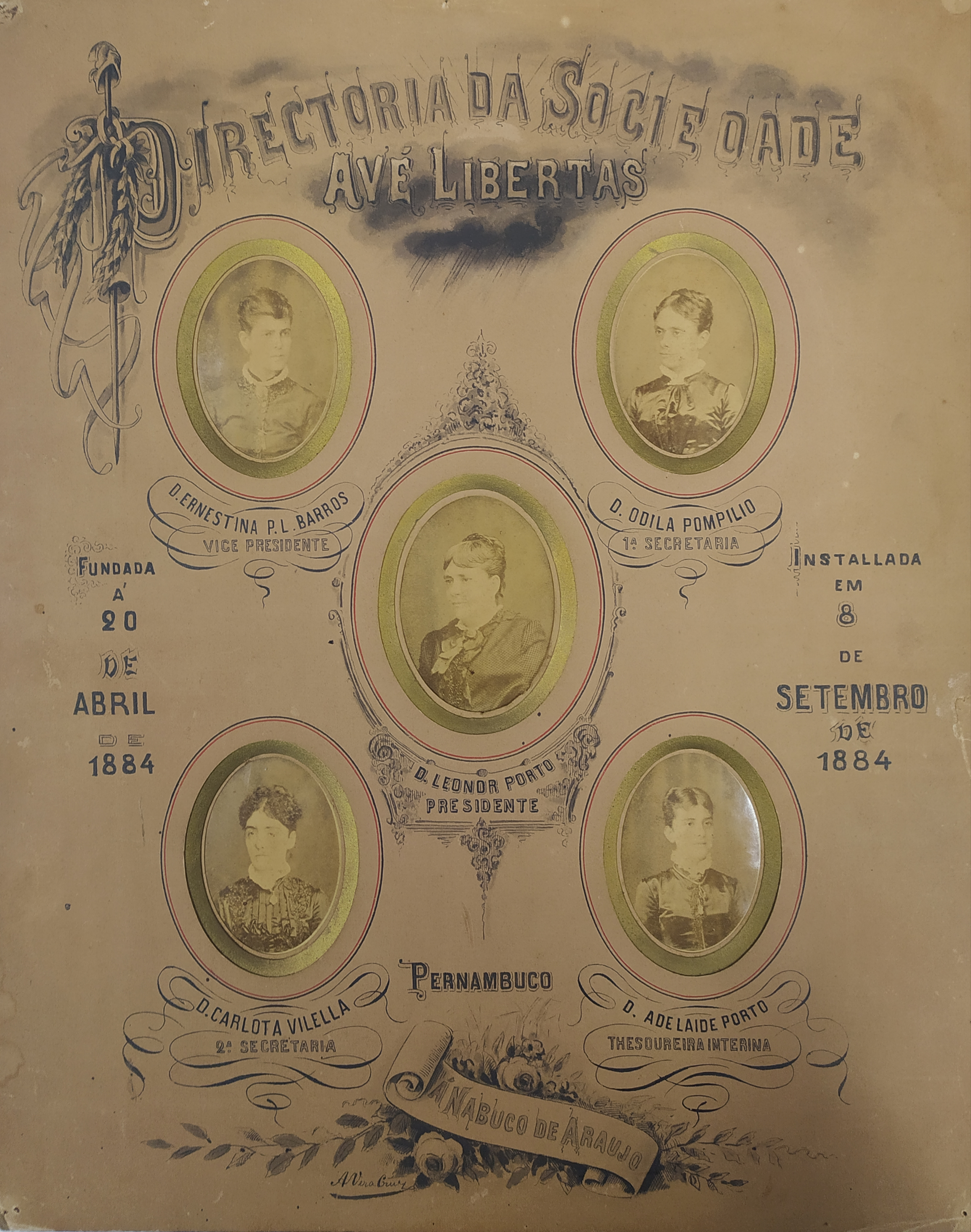
- Picture showing the director, vice-president, 1st and 2nd secretaries and treasurer of the Ave Libertas society. Contains a tribute to Joaquim Nabuco at the bottom of the picture.
- Formation: April 20, 1884; 142 years ago
- Dissolved: 1888; 138 years ago
- Headquarters: Recife, Pernambuco, Brazil
- Secretary General: Odila Pompilio
- President: Leonor Porto
- Vice-President: Ernestina P. L. Barros
- 2nd Secretary: Carlota Vilella
- Acting treasurer: Adelaide Porto

Ave Libertas Society (English: Hail to Freedom) was an abolitionist association based in Recife, founded and composed exclusively of women activists residing in the capital of Pernambuco. It was established on April 20, 1884, and officially inaugurated and registered on September 8.

== Creation ==
After March 25, 1884, the date marking the liberation of enslaved people in the province of Ceará, the number of abolitionist societies increased across the country. The association gained prominence by highlighting the positive outcomes of the abolition of slavery in Ceará, which became the first province in Brazil to abolish slavery fully.

The societies that emerged after Ceará's liberation sought to replicate some of the strategies adopted there in other provinces. Celso Castilho documented the growth of abolitionist associations in the province of Pernambuco, identifying that seven societies were established in 1884, including the Ave Libertas women's society.

For the association, the significance of Ceará's abolition was such that it was initially named "March 25." However, as another group already bore that name, the society chose the name "Ave Libertas" instead.

The association was founded on April 20, 1884, by Leonor Porto, a fashion designer and seamstress at the time, and a former member of the Cupim Club.

== History of the Association ==
From the Nova Emancipadora Society, which included both men and women, some members came together to form a women's society. In addition to advocating for the abolitionist cause, these women sought greater autonomy in decision-making, as abolitionism, like other political movements, was traditionally dominated by men.

=== Invitation to start a women's association ===
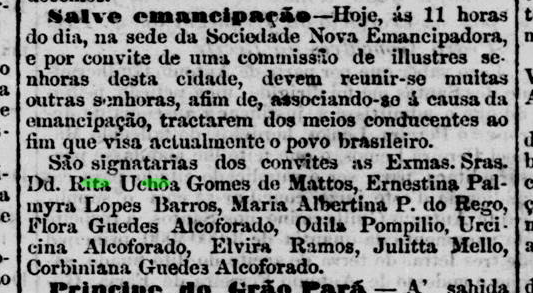
Extract from the newspaper Diario de Pernambuco, April 20, 1884, Number 91, p. 3.

In 1884, militant abolitionists submitted a request to João Ramos, the president of the New Emancipation Association, to convene a meeting for the new society. This group, which consisted exclusively of women advocating for the freedom of enslaved individuals, was officially established as the Ave Libertas Society on September 8 of the same year.

Ave Libertas aimed to combat slavery through lawful means, with its primary strategy being the purchase of freedoms. In its first year of operation, the association succeeded in freeing 200 captives. To achieve this, its members organized bazaars and cultural events, held conferences, and spread their ideas through speeches, raising awareness and garnering support within society.

Leonor Porto was one of the most prominent members of the society, and her contributions were instrumental to its success. A fashion designer and seamstress, she used her profession to connect with other women. Initially, Leonor served as the society's interim treasurer on a provisional board of directors. However, when the association was formally established, she was elected president. With the founding of Ave Libertas, Leonor freed the enslaved people she still owned. This act, which became a significant political event, not only brought visibility to the society but also inspired others to follow her example.

Other notable members included D. Odila Pompílio and D. Maria Albertina Pereira do Rego. Odila served as interim president and was known for her frequent speeches within the association. Maria Albertina, the association's first secretary, delivered the group's inaugural speech. These three women are frequently mentioned in historical documents for their contributions to the association and the abolitionist movement in Recife.

The society also included mothers and daughters who worked together within Ave Libertas. Their identities have been uncovered through newspaper publications detailing aspects of the activists' personal lives. Once again, Leonor Porto stands out, as she and her two daughters, Adelaide and Albertina, were actively involved in the society's activities.

Historical figures such as Joaquim Nabuco, José Mariano, José do Patrocínio, André Rebouças, and João Clapp, among others, were prominent in the abolitionist movement and are frequently highlighted in historiography. Despite this, the contributions of the members of Ave Libertas, whether in collaboration with these prominent abolitionists or through their independent efforts, were invaluable in strengthening the movement and ultimately contributing to the abolition of slavery. The abolitionists mentioned above recognized the contributions of the association. Joaquim Nabuco and José Mariano, in particular, maintained direct contact with its members and attended events organized by the society.

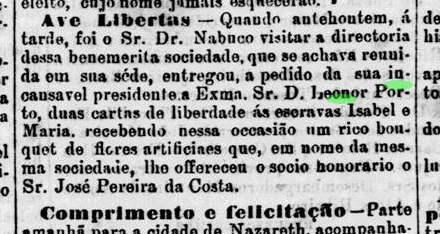
Extract from the newspaper Jornal do Recife, June 20, 1885. Ed. 139 p.1.

The newspaper Jornal do Recife archive highlights the relationship between the association's members and prominent abolitionists, mentioning a visit by Joaquim Nabuco to the association's board. During the visit, Nabuco presented D. Leonor with two letters of freedom for enslaved individuals, Isabel and Maria.

In the province of Pernambuco, the Ave Libertas society emerged as a women's organization dedicated to freeing all captives in Recife, not just women and children, as was often the case with women's groups in other provinces.

== Practices ==
Through the Ave Libertas association, the abolitionist women of Recife engaged in the common strategies of the broader abolitionist movement. Like men's and mixed societies, they operated both institutionally and in public spaces. A significant number of the society's women activists had access to education, enabling them to work in various professions, such as teaching, poetry, and music. This access allowed them to participate in professional spaces and express themselves through newspapers and magazines. Luzilá Ferreira referred to their press involvement as an “intellectual struggle.”

The members of Ave Libertas cultivated a network of activism to recruit more women into the association, raise awareness of the abolitionist cause, and involve them in broader political issues. By 1887, the society had grown to 60 members. However, there are no records of dark-skinned women participating in the institutionalized abolitionist movement in Recife. Nevertheless, writer Luzilá Ferreira argues that the individual actions of enslaved women seeking their freedom were a fundamental aspect of women's resistance to slavery.

Regarding the association's practical activities, members organized events to raise funds, ranging from smaller initiatives to larger efforts such as theatrical festivals. The money collected was used to purchase freedom for enslaved individuals.

=== Abolitionist Performance and Festival ===
A performance at the Santo Antônio Theater was held to benefit the Ave Libertas association and was especially dedicated to D. Leonor Porto in recognition of her contributions to the abolitionist cause. Another notable event, a festival, took place at the Santa Isabel Theater as an extraordinary session of the Ave Libertas society. During the event, the new board of directors was announced: Leonor Porto as president; Ernestina P. Lopes de Barros as vice president; Odila Pompilio and Carlota Villela dos Santos as the first and second secretaries, respectively. Flora Guedes Alcoforado served as treasurer but was later replaced by Adelaide Porto.

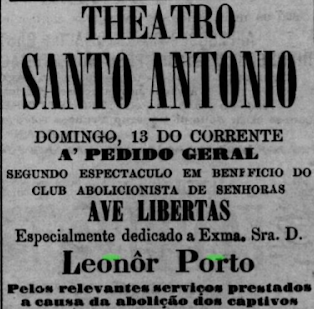
Announcement of the show in the printed newspaper Diario de Pernambuco (July 11, 1884).

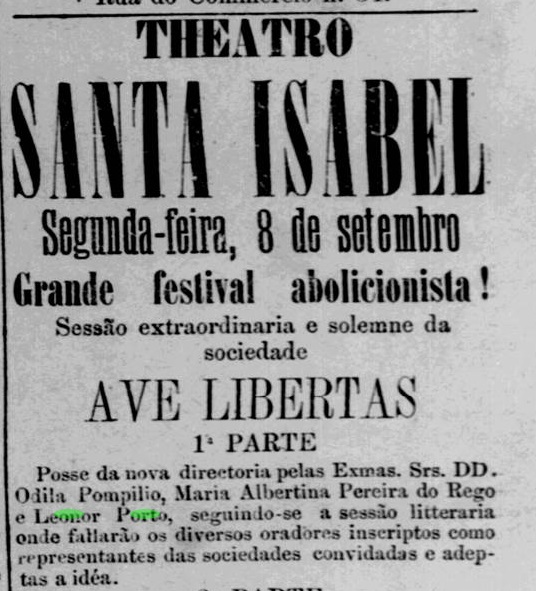
Invitation to the Great Abolitionist Festival, in the printed newspaper Diário de Pernambuco (September 8, 1884).

=== Conference of March 25, 1885 ===
On March 25, 1885, the Ave Libertas Society organized an abolitionist conference at the Santa Isabel Theater. The date was chosen not only to commemorate the abolition of slavery in the province of Ceará but also to honor the anniversary of Brazil's first constitution in 1824.

In his speech, Fernando de Castro praised the women present, describing them as embodiments of work and patriotism. He then turned to the early days of Portuguese colonization in Brazil, offering a critical account of how the foundations of colonial slavery were established. During his address, Castro directly criticized the Jesuits, accusing them of promoting the enslavement of both Africans and Indigenous peoples. He argued that South America witnessed the moral destruction of two races and lamented that, even with English efforts to intercept slave ships, Brazil continued to engage in the trafficking of Africans.

== Ave Libertas newspaper ==
According to Luzilá Ferreira, Leonor Porto is depicted on the front page of the newspaper as a venerable matron, dressed in a high-collared gown with her hair tied up. She is presented as a leader, not in the traditional form of a male figure, but as a woman. Her portrait is framed by laurel branches on one side, symbolizing victory, and oak branches on the other, representing strength and resilience. Above her image is the Society's flag, symbolizing protection.

The second, third, and fourth pages of the newspaper feature libertarian writings by other members of the association. On the second page, several abolitionist writings signed by women are included. One of these is addressed to the enslaved, assuring them that the association would remain steadfast in its efforts. It concludes with the powerful statement: “We will liberate the homeland or die in the struggle, embracing the banner of abolition, which is the banner of progress and civilization!”

On the second page of the newspaper, there is a text addressed to Brazilian women, in which the association calls on them to join the abolitionist cause, stating: “Let us be the martyrs of the present to become the heroines of the future.”

The third page, like the previous one, features abolitionist writings published by the association. These writings encourage women to join the struggle and reaffirm the association's commitment to the anti-slavery cause, even in the face of insults and attacks from slaveholders.

The fourth page continues with the abolitionist theme, once again emphasizing the society's determination to persist in its mission while criticizing those who oppose freedom. However, unlike the previous pages, this one also includes a sonnet.

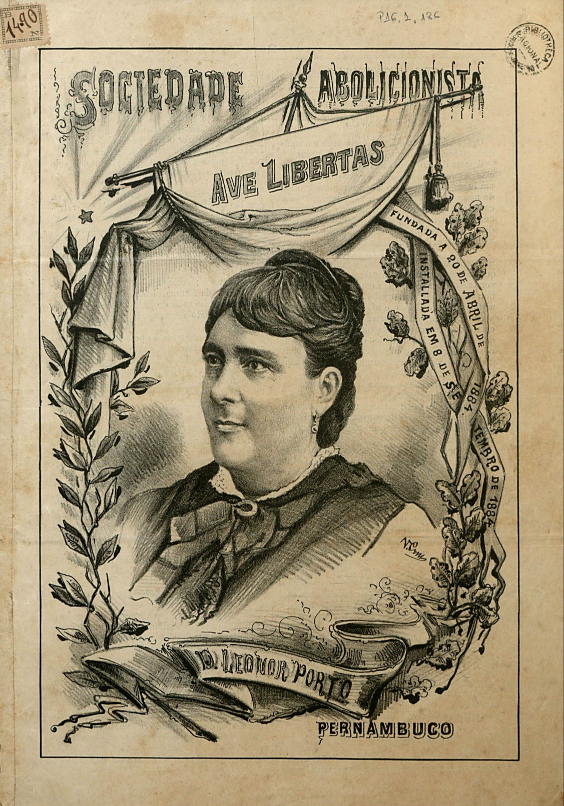
Cover of the newspaper of the abolitionist society Ave Libertas featuring its director Leonor Porto.

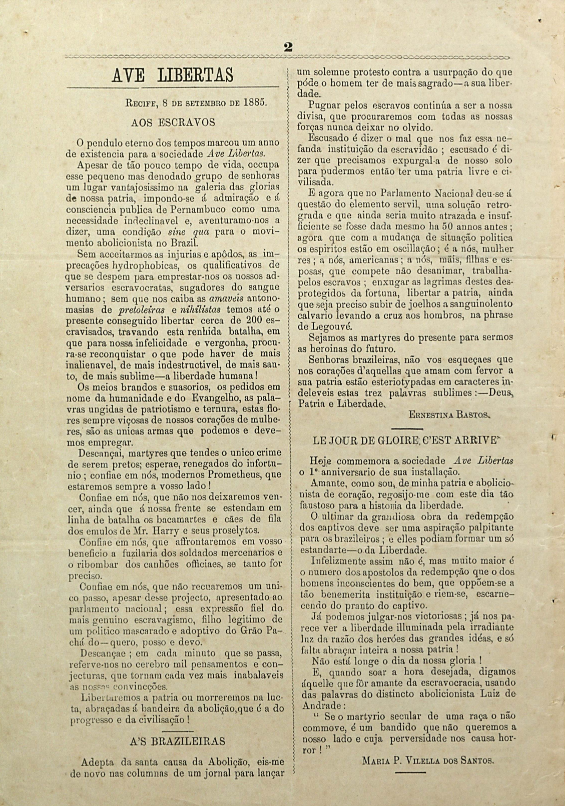
Ave Libertas Society Newspaper, page 2.

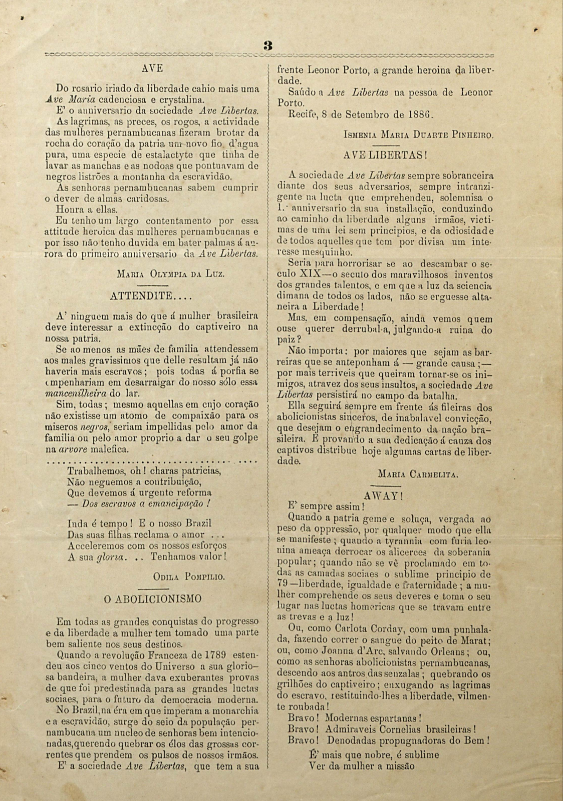
Ave Libertas Society Newspaper, page 3.

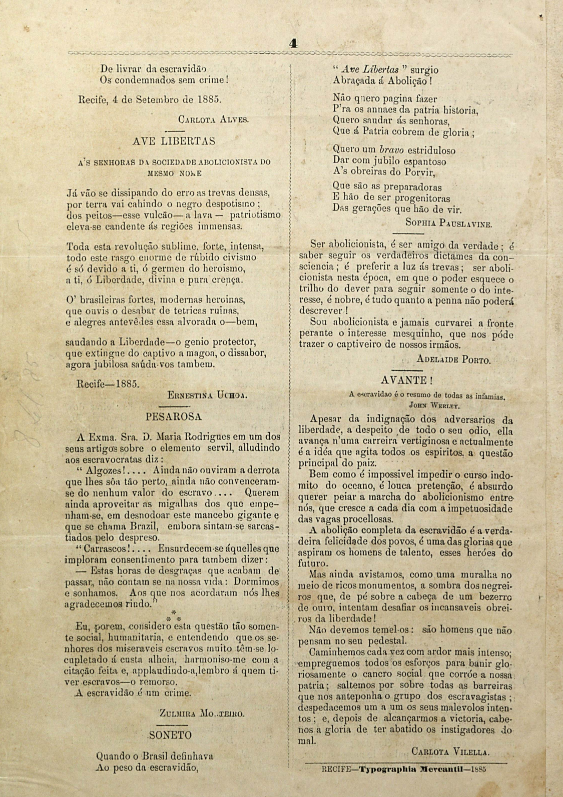
Ave Libertas Society Newspaper, page 4.

== Statutes of the Ave Libertas Society ==
The following statute was formalized on May 4th, 1884:

=== Title 1 ===
Article 1 - An abolitionist association is created in Recife under the name of Sociedade Ave Libertas, whose aims are:

§ 1º - To promote the liberation of all slaves in the municipality of Recife by all lawful and legal means at its disposal.

§ 2º - To protect their fate by demanding that their masters cease their ill-treatment, punishments, and torture by all lenient and appropriate means.

=== Title 2: Partners, rights and obligations ===
Article 2 - Members are ladies of families from the city of Recife and its suburbs who sign up in a book adapted for the Society or who are proposed by full members.

Article 3 - Members are divided into full members, honorary members, and benefactors.

§ 1 - Full members are all those included in Article 2.

§ 2 - Honorary members are those the Society deems worthy of this title for their services rendered to the cause of emancipation.

§ 3 - Benefactors are those who donate one or more freebies or more than 100$000 at a time.

§ 4 - Honorary and benefactor members may be of any nationality, and these titles are extended to men.

Article 4 - Full members may vote and be voted for.

Article 5 - A full member is obliged to:

§ 1 - To pay a membership fee of no less than 2$000 and a monthly fee of 1$000.

§ 2 - To attend the meetings and be able to discuss any issue and make any comments that may be suggested.

=== Title 3: The Board ===
Article 6 - The board of directors shall consist of a president, vice-president, 1st and 2nd secretaries, and treasurer.

=== Title 4: The President and Vice-President ===
Article 7 - The President is responsible for:

§ 1 - Convene and chair the sessions, appointing the day and time.

§ 2 - Appointing any necessary committees.

§ 3 - Authorizing the treasury to make the necessary expenditures.

§ 4 - Promoting vacant positions until new elections are held.

Article 8 - The vice-president is responsible for replacing the president in her impediments.

=== Title 5: Secretaries ===
Article 9 - The 1st secretary is responsible for:

§ 1 - Drafting and reading the minutes of the sessions and all that pertains to their office, such as official letters, reports, correspondence, and keeping the company archives.

Article 10 - The 2nd secretary is responsible for:

§ 1 - Accept all the work assigned to them or distributed by the 1st secretary.

§ 2 - Substitute for the 1st secretary in the event of his/her impediment.

=== Title 6: Treasury ===
Article 11 - The treasurer is responsible for:

§ 1 - To be in charge of the Society's cash office.

§ 2 - Receive all monies owed and offered to the Society.

§3 - Appoint a person to be in charge of collection, being able to set a percentage if deemed necessary.

§4 - To keep a cash book.

§5 - To present a trial balance every 3 months.

=== Title 7: Sessions ===
Article 12 - The assembly will meet once a month in ordinary session, and may meet extraordinarily when the president deems it necessary or when the meeting is requested by 10 or more members who are in good standing with the treasury.

Article 13 - On the anniversary of the solemn installation, which is considered festive for the society, there will be a literary session, which may include music, on which occasion the new board of directors will be sworn in. The abolitionist societies of Recife will be invited to this session, while other invitations will be at the discretion of the board of directors. At this session, the society shall free as many slaves as possible.

Article 14 - Whenever the interests of the society so require, there shall be a meeting of the board of directors.

Article 15 - Sessions will be held with any number of members.

=== Title 8: Society's income ===
Article 16 - The Society's income will be made up of: membership fees, donations, the results of subscriptions promoted by committees, benefits, lotteries, and subscriptions requested from the government.

=== Title 9: Alforries ===
Article 17 - The Society will not compensate for freedom that is achieved for an amount greater than Rs$100000 for each slave.

Article 18 - The Society will give preference to slaves who have already been enrolled in other societies organized in this city.

=== Title 10: General provisions ===
Article 19 - The election of the Board of Directors shall take place 15 days before the anniversary of the installation, unless the session designated for this purpose, which corresponds to that period, is attended by less than 10 members, the election shall take place with any number.

Article 20 - In the event of the dissolution of the society, the remainder of the social fund that is not enough for liberation, will be offered to the societies of St. Vincent de Paul of Recife.

== Bibliography ==
- Leandro, Jacilene de Lima (2020). "O discurso soletrado no feminino": O engajamento de mulheres no movimento abolicionista na cidade do Recife (1884-1888) [“The discourse spelled feminine": The engagement of women in the abolitionist movement in the city of Recife (1884-1888)] (PDF) (in Portuguese). Recife: UFRPE. Archived from the original (PDF) on 2025-01-07.
- Castilho, Celso Thomas (2008). Abolitionism Matters: The Politics of Antislavery in Pernambuco, Brazil, 1869-1888. Berkeley: University of California.
- Silva, Wladimir Barbosa; Barreto, Maria Renilda N. (2014). "Mulheres e abolição: protagonismo e ação" [Women and abolition: protagonism and action]. Revista da ABPN. 6 (14): 50–62.
- Ferreira, Luzilá Gonçalves (1999). Suaves amazonas: mulheres e abolição da escravatura no nordeste [Gentle Amazons: women and the abolition of slavery in the northeast] (in Portuguese). Recife: UFPE. ISBN 9788573151534.
- Santos, Maria Emilia Vasconcelos dos; Leandro, Jacilene de Lima (2019). "As mulheres e o movimento abolicionista: participação e engajamento (Recife, 1880-1888)" [Women and the abolitionist movement: participation and engagement (Recife, 1880-1888)]. Gnarus. 10 (10): 48–55. Archived from the original on 2023-02-25.
- Costa, Francisco Augusto Pereira da (1884). Pernambuco ao Ceará: O dia 25 de Março de 1884 [Pernambuco to Ceará: March 25, 1884] (in Portuguese). Recife: Typographia Central.
- Leandro, Jacilene de Lima (2023). A luta abolicionista, a Ave Libertas e uma nova geração feminina de ativismo (Recife, 1884-1888) [The abolitionist struggle, Ave Libertas and a new generation of female activism (Recife, 1884-1888)] (PDF) (in Portuguese). Recife: UFPE. Archived from the original (PDF) on 2025-01-07.
