= Post-abolition in Brazil =

Period following the abolition of slavery

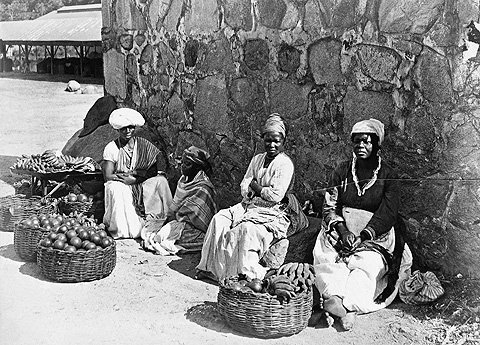
May 14th, 1888, the day after the end of slavery.

Post-abolition is the period of Brazilian history immediately following the abolition of slavery in 1888. Defined as a major break in the system practiced until then, the period triggered significant changes in the Brazilian economy and society, which depended largely on slave labor. For the freedmen, in many ways their situation worsened. In the late 1800s and early 1900s, there was an influx of European and asian immigrants into Brazil in hopes of keeping working wages low as there would be competition for the limited jobs between the freed slaves and immigrants. The government did not organize any program for their integration into society, and they were left to their own devices. The dominant white society remained steeped in racism and discrimination manifested itself at all levels. The vast majority of freedmen remained marginalized and deprived of access to health, education, vocational training, and the exercise of citizenship. Many lost their jobs and their homes and were forced to migrate in search of new jobs, which generally proved to be precarious and difficult. Misery became commonplace. Freed women faced additional sexualization, responsibilities, and abuse in comparison to their male counter parts after abolition. The post-abolition period was the beginning of a long process of struggle by blacks for rights, dignity, recognition, and inclusion, which to this day is still unfinished. The abolition freed about 700,000 slaves in 1888. At that moment most of the black and brown people in Brazil were already free. According to the 1872 census (the only one to take place in the imperial period), the slave population represented 15.24% of the total population of Brazil, while black and brown people in general represented 58% of that total.

== Abolitionist campaign ==
Golden Law Diploma.

In the 1880s, with the influence of Joaquim Nabuco, two movements of great importance for the abolition of slavery, the Brazilian Society against Slavery and the Central Emancipating Association, began to gain strength.

It was after a visit to a chapel in Massangana, Pernambuco, that Nabuco recognized a moral problem regarding slavery, sparking a genuine interest in putting his life at the service of the "generous race". At the age of 20, a deputy at the time, Joaquim began debates in Parliament on the project that aimed to free all slaves.

Nabuco wrote several works about slavery, among them "Minha Formação" and "O Abolicionismo", claiming that "it is a crime, an attempt to civilization and to economic and political progress, it is responsible for the backwardness of the country, an obstacle to national construction. These are civic, public reasons".

Nabuco's travels abroad facilitated his involvement with the abolitionist campaign. Inspired by the campaign against the slave trade and the "social movement", two forms of pressure on the state, consequently on the authorities.

Another important figure for the success of this movement was José do Patrocínio, a radical abolitionist, unlike Nabuco, who was considered a moderate. Patrocínio defended that the campaign should take to the streets with the participation of the people, however, he affirmed that the people alone could not achieve the objectives, that it should be an "alliance of the sovereign with the people".

In opposition to Patrocínio's radicalism, Nabuco defended that this struggle was for a people without a voice, consequently it should be led by whites. These processes involved two aspects. The first, the progress of this movement could not go beyond the limits of monarchical legality, this should be a decision initially taken by the State and the slaveholding farmers, being solved within the institutional space, so that the situation would not have a dimension that the control could be lost. The second side is the one defended by Nabuco, that blacks could not be active subjects in the movement. There was a concern of the white elite involved in the conflict that emancipation could not affect the landowning economic order. In this case, the involvement of blacks in this process was fearful, because the elite feared that they could cause an uncontrolled society.

Despite the existence of some laws, such as the Free Womb Law in 1871, it was necessary to have a law that abolished slavery. Meanwhile, the abolitionist campaign initially promoted by Joaquim Nabuco in 1880, was of extreme importance for the Golden Law to be sanctioned by Princess Isabel in 1888, of No. 3,353, which had two articles "Art. 1°: It is declared extinct since the date of this law slavery in Brazil. And Art. 2°: The provisions to the contrary are revoked".

== Migration ==
Escapes and rebellions of captives in the imperial period were common, becoming one of the main concerns of the plantation owners of the time. In order to avoid such problems, the landlords tried to make sure that the slaves had a connection to the farm and to the owner. Some strategies, as an example of this, were the ties of gratitude. The plantation owner granted mass releases. This process occurred before abolition, and was intended to "arouse their gratitude... the slaves were to receive their freedom from his hands, not from the state, and perceive it as a lordly gift".

These strategies used by the landlords, had nothing but the intent that after emancipation, the blacks would remain loyal to him and his land, in the "hope of retaining the freedmen".

It was up to the captives the decision, post-abolition, of whether or not to remain on the land where they spent most of their lives. However, this displacement had to take into account how these newly freed men would survive in face of the freedom they had been given, in face of the slaves' desire to build a "family life, housing and domestic production", thus controlling the pace of life they wanted. However, as the years went by, the mobility conquered by the slaves turned from an exercise of their freedom into a curse, taking into account the working conditions negotiated between the plantation owner and the free man who needed to survive.

To hinder the enslavement process, the registrations were important for the landlords, since a slave without them would be considered a freed man. The Republic burned these registrations, emphasizing the distinctions between the freeborn and the freedmen, who sought this distinction.

Migration in this period resulted in the marginalization of the black man, when the woman went from being a slave to being a maid in some residence. Freedom continued to be curtailed. The "study of this migration, in particular, as one of the elements of post-abolition history is that it originates from a context created both in the process of fixing the new forms of labor in the countryside, and from the absence of policies specifically aimed at ensuring some kind of access to land and credit for freedmen and their descendants".

== Immigration ==
Even before slavery was abolished in Brazil, slave owners feared abolition would leave them with vast farms and plantations without a cheap labor force. As word of abolition began to spread in the 1870s, the government started to look towards European immigrants, most commonly from Portugal, Spain, and Italy, to fill the labor and job markets which were opened by abolition. In 1872, the government doubled their expenditure on marketing to persuade European immigrants to move to Brazil. The idea was that if there was an influx of workers, plantation owners could keep the cost of labor low as slaves and immigrants would be competing for the limited jobs available. In addition to European immigrants, there were many Asian immigrants who Brazilian leaders considered valuable to their economy because they believed Asians were more equipped to handle the farm work and would work for a cheaper wage than European immigrants. Brazil's government officials at the time stereotyped Chinese immigrants to be obedient, efficient, passive, and twice as productive as European immigrants. However, the role of European's immigrating to Brazil was not only for employment opportunities, but to push the governments motives for "whitening".

Scientific racism was on the rise throughout the world in the mid to late 1800s, and Brazil believed their large black population was harmful towards the countries blood and future. The government attempted to whiten the population by encouraging interracial marriages. European immigrants not only were able to fulfill the many jobs left by the abolishment of slavery, but were seen as an asset to help whiten Brazil's future populations. These white and Asian immigrants were given many bottom class jobs over freed slaved. The large numbers of immigrants made it hard for freed slaves to find paid labor and break through the oppression holding them down at this time.

== Parental power ==
After the Abolition, one of the issues that started to appear in guardianship proceedings was the color of the skin of poor mothers whose children were being taken under their guardianship, in an evident demonstration of the synonym of poverty that the simple mention of the "black" or "mulatto" color of such mothers could indicate. The legislation used by Brazilian Law in granting guardianship to orphans considered unfit was based on both Roman Law and the Philippine Ordinances, in which the woman was not granted parental power (characterized by the right to have control over the upbringing of underage children or, in some way, seen as incapable, by the parents).

After 1890, another issue that started to be recurrent in the guardianship processes was that of duly officialized marriages being used as support to try to recover the children under guardianship, a task undertaken by many families that had their children given to guardianship. However, in addition to the struggle for possession of their children these women would still have to submit to the good will of their partners, not always willing to contract marriage in the official sense.

== Marginalization ==
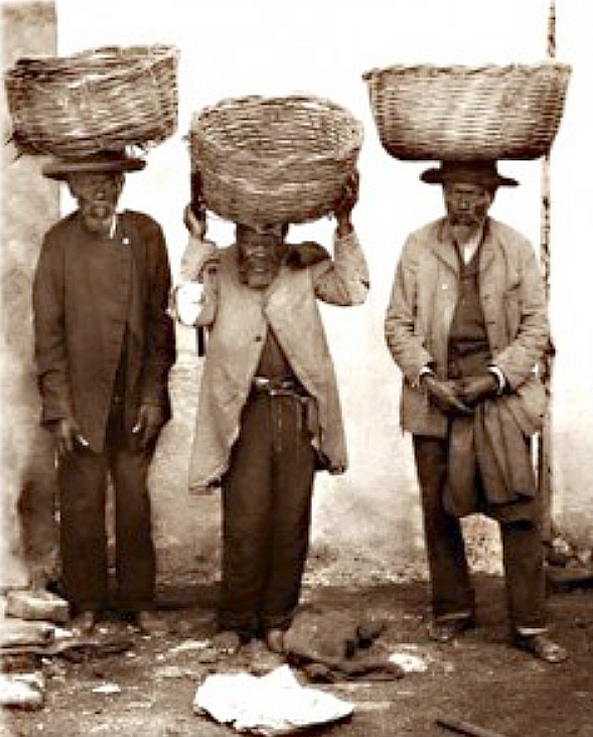
Three black men in Porto Alegre, in 1895, 7 years after abolition.

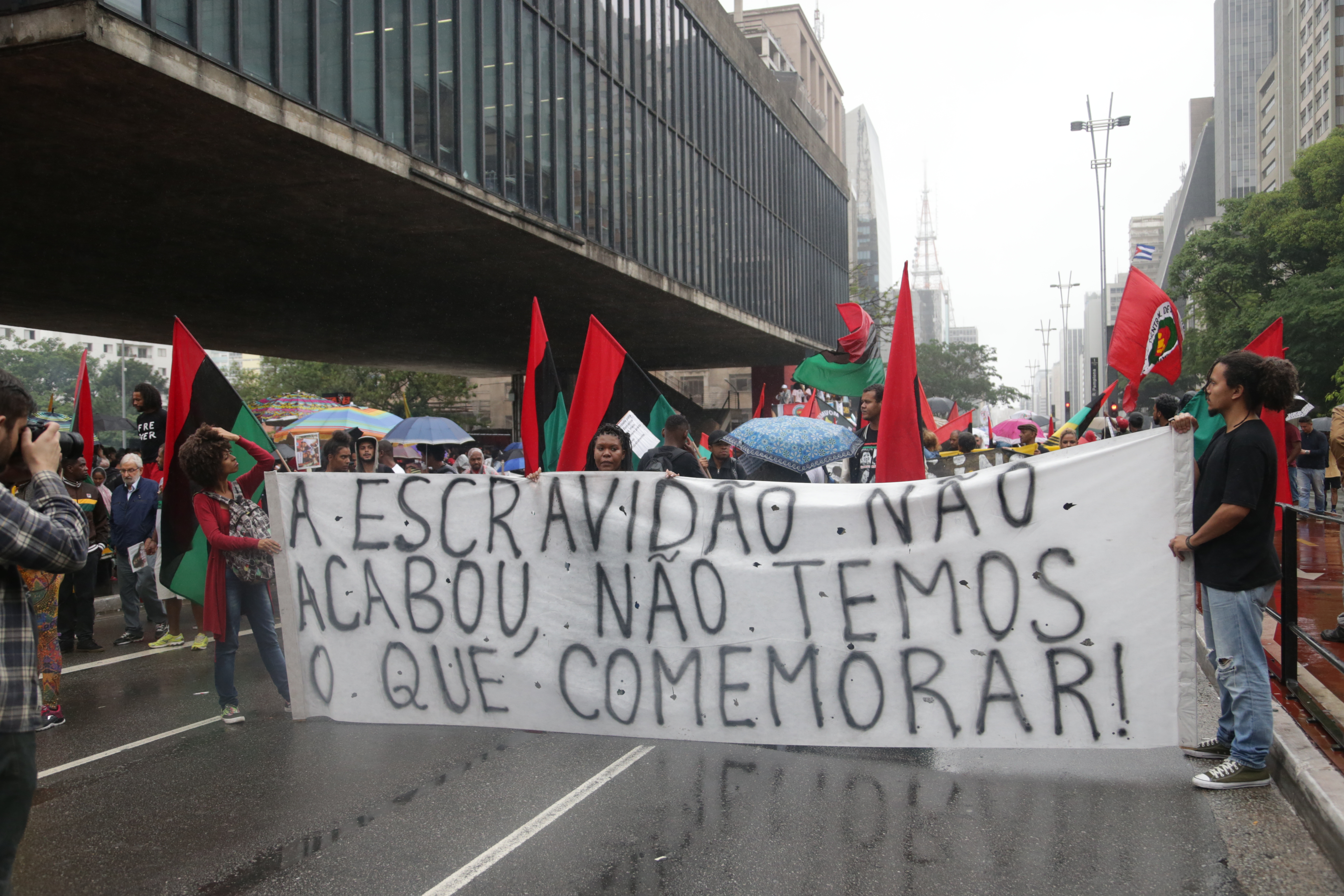
The 14th São Paulo Black Consciousness March in 2017. The poster reads: "Slavery didn't end, we have nothing to celebrate".

The abolition of slavery in Brazil in 1888 condemned the blacks to continue living as victims of the system, since they were free, but without education, documents, money, housing, employment, schooling or any other kind of social assistance provided by the State. Therefore, the Golden Law was unable to transform the deep economic and social inequalities. The master/slave relationship became white/black, both hierarchical.

The abolition did not allow the blacks to have the same living conditions as the rest of the population, besides not bringing citizenship to the freed blacks. Sociologist and political scientist Antônio Carlos Mazzeo, from the São Paulo State University (Unesp), explains that there was little investment in the integration of the blacks into the national economy. "When the Golden Law was promulgated, the marginalization of the black man in Brazil happened. They were excluded from the economy", he adds. He says that this population is still marginalized. "Most black people live in favelas, without jobs, in prisons, and don't have access to education. Still in Brazil the black population is a systematic victim of racist ideology", he points out.

After the abolition, the black population went through great socio-economic difficulties, ignored by various sectors of society, which marginalized them and in a certain way pushed them out of the urban centers because of a hygienist policy, being the genesis of the slumming process. However, it would not be wise to apply this pattern built by a traditional historiography with the purpose of establishing a universalization of the unemployed, illiterate, lazy, promiscuous black person, etc.

Even being in a situation of invisibility and exposed to recurring racism, freed blacks were also able to create new social and labor relations. With the end of slavery, it was possible to negotiate these new forms of work, for example on the old farms, becoming independent in subsistence farming or in new forms of urban work. Dário de Bittencourt and Carlos da Silva Santos are two examples of blacks who were born in the beginning of the 20th century, who had two different social conditions, but were academic intellectuals who were successful in the political world, going against the stereotype established after slavery.

This historiographical current has been criticized for romanticizing this marginalization of the freedman who was replaced by the European immigrant, a view that places a Paulista context as a single national history, not presenting an explanatory potential for an entire period.

== Freed Female Life ==
Throughout Brazil's history of slavery, women were oppressed and used by the slave masters in a different way than males. Female slaves endured sexualization and sexual abuse on top of labor intensive jobs and the house hold jobs typically associated with maids (laundry, cleaning, cooking, childcare, etc). Women were even expected to serve as wet nurses to their masters children at the expensive of their own child's wellbeing and life. Some experts in the field believe that 92% of enslaved women who were rented out as wet nurses in Rio were separated from their own babies to fulfill their duty to their master. Just because slavery ended did not mean the end of the white men taking advantage of black women. When slavery ended, many women were forced back into these sexual shackles as they had no choice but to provide "services" and be bound to sexual relationships in exchange for the money they needed to survive as a freed individual.

After abolition, freed women were forced into survival mode as they now had no money and many had children to provide for independently. Many freed women migrated from São Paulo to Rio De Janeiro under the assumption there were more available jobs such as cooking, cleaning, and baking. Urban environments were easier for women to find jobs because many homes still needed nannies, cooks, and cleaners which were seen as a black woman's role, even after abolition. That said, the drastic increase of unemployed people led to intense competition between the unemployed for the limited jobs. Some women were left on the streets with no place to go and no money. There was an increase of arrest of formerly enslaved women at the end of the 19th century and into the early 20th century. Experts attribute the increased number of arrests and longer stays of women in jail rather than men to be because the fact law enforcement believed only immoral women would be out on the streets at night. These women continued to get a bad reputation because they were forced to stand up and fight back as they were abused and harassed living on the streets. Scholars have argued that freed women were held to a different societal standard than men, and faced different challenges due to their gender.

== Acquired freedom ==
With the abolition, the enslaved person was no longer seen legally as an object, although he was seen as an individual with his own particularities, he conquered constitutional rights in this process of destruction of modern slavery in Brazil and in all America, linked to this extension of citizenship rights. With the end of this slavery structure, a new social order was produced, which established hierarchy, racial category and conditions to access the new political and civil rights.

== See also ==
- Slavery in Brazil
- Slavery in Latin America
- Abolitionism in Brazil
- Racism in Brazil
- Golden Law
- Rio Branco Law
- Eusébio de Queirós Law
- Race and ethnicity in Brazil
- First Brazilian Republic
