= Eusébio de Queirós Law =

Law in Imperial Brazil

General Assembly of the Empire of Brazil
- Long title: Law No. 581 of 4 September 1850
- Citation: Law No. 581 of 4 September 1850
- Territorial extent: Empire of Brazil
- Enacted by: General Assembly of the Empire of Brazil
- Enacted: 4 September 1850
- Signed by: Pedro II

Summary
- Establishes measures to repress African trafficking in this Empire.

The Eusébio de Queirós Law, officially Law No. 581 of 4 September 1850, was a law passed in the Empire of Brazil on 4 September 1850 to abolish international slave trade in the country. This law was named after Eusébio de Queirós Coutinho Matoso da Câmara, who was the Brazilian Minister of Justice from 1848–1852.

The law was put into action by the government acting under emperor Pedro II. It reinforced a previous law that was put into place on 7 November 1831, but had never been fully enforced and it also was based on an 1837 anti-slave trade bill of Felisberto Caldeira Brant, which had not been enacted into a law. This bill was modified and reintroduced into the Chamber of Deputies and eventually passed. Even though the slave trade was officially abolished in 1850, slavery itself was not abolished in Brazil until 1888, which made Brazil the last country in the Western world to abolish slavery.

The government was, however, against the British pressures applied to end the slave trade, such as the seizure of slave ships by British warships. In 1845, the British parliament enacted the Aberdeen Act, which allowed British cruisers to seize Brazilian slave ships in attempts to end their slave trade. This caused Brazilians to import as many slaves as possible in case the British succeeded in abolishing their slave trade, which is why the vast majority of slaves arrived in Brazil during 1847–1849.

Slavery in Brazil was extremely prevalent and slave ships carried between 3.6 and 5 million slaves into Brazil over roughly three centuries (1525–1851). Rio de Janeiro alone had the largest slave population where 38.3% of their population consisted of slaves, or 80,000 slaves.

== See also ==
- Abolitionism in Brazil
- Post-abolition in Brazil
- Saraiva-Cotegipe Law
