= Rio Branco Law =

1871 Brazilian law intended to provide freedom to slaves

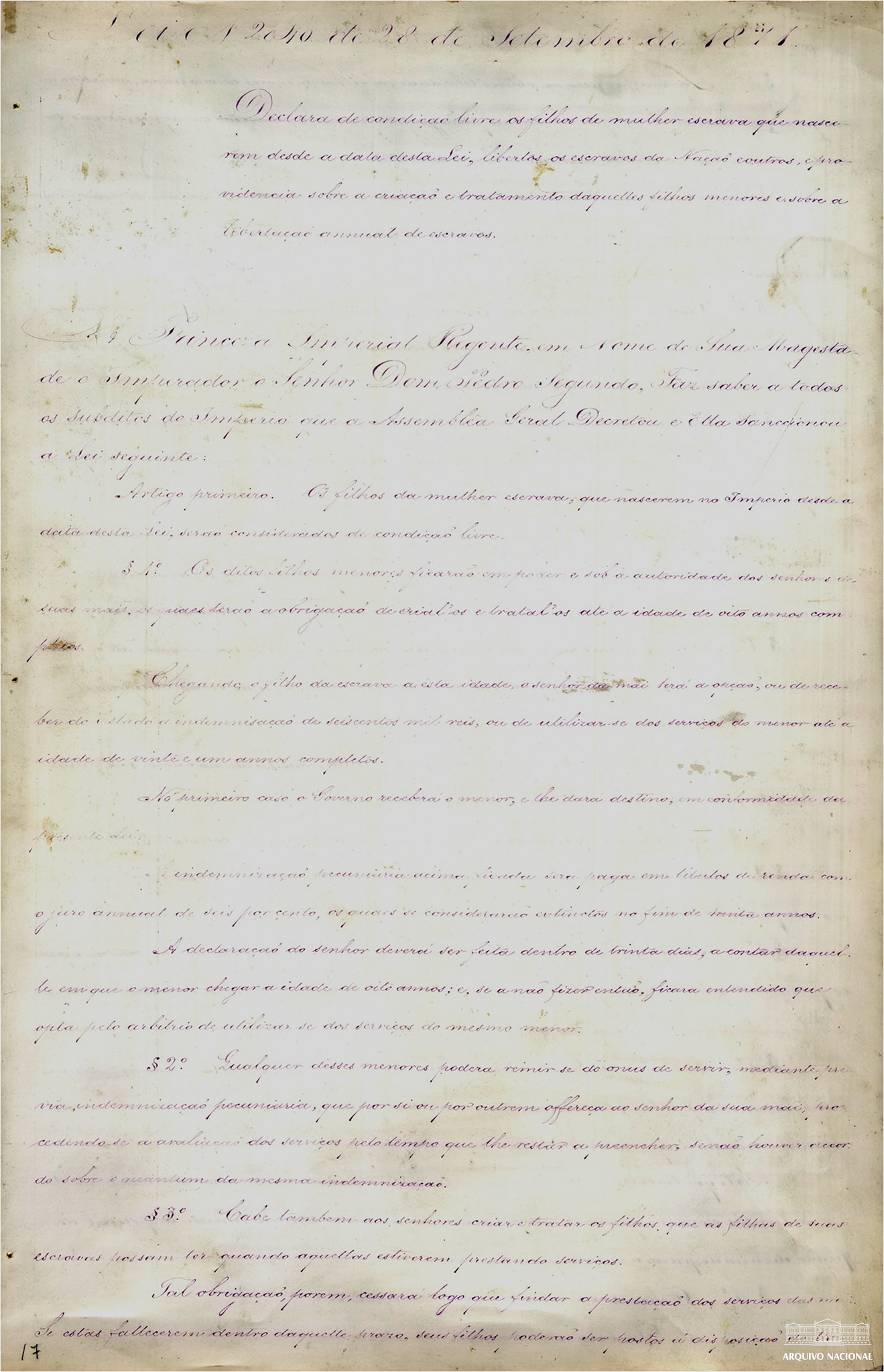
- Rio Branco Law, Brazilian National Archives

General Assembly of the Empire of Brazil
- Long title: Law No. 2,040 of 28 September 1871
- Citation: Law No. 2,040 of 28 September 1871
- Territorial extent: Empire of Brazil
- Enacted by: General Assembly of the Empire of Brazil
- Enacted: 28 September 1871
- Signed by: Isabel, Princess Imperial of Brazil

Summary
- Declares the children of slave women born since the date of this law to be free, the slaves of the Nation and others free, and provides for the upbringing and treatment of those minor children and the annual liberation of slaves.

The Rio Branco law (Portuguese: Lei Rio Branco), also known as the Law of Free Birth (Lei do Ventre Livre), named after its champion, prime minister José Paranhos, Viscount of Rio Branco, was passed by the General Assembly of the Empire of Brazil on 28 September 1871. It was intended to grant freedom to all newborn children of slaves, and slaves of the state or crown. Political scientist Luis Schenoni, situates the law within a broader program of centralized state-building reforms under Rio Branco, whose government also established a state fund for the emancipation of enslaved adults. However, children of enslaved women in Brazil were obligated to serve their mother's owners until the age of 21, a condition that was often more or less that of slavery. The law did not define the exact legal status of enslaved women's wombs; this was negotiated by enslaved people afterwards, with women at the forefront.

The law was the beginning of an abolition movement in Brazil, but it turned out to be more of a legal loophole than a radical measure that led to viable progress. Only a few people were freed under the law, while more than one million people continued to be held as slaves throughout Brazil. This law had more of an influence in the northern part of the country, which was leaning further toward wage rather than slave labor.

Many of those freed under the Rio Branco law migrated to the north to work for wages on the plantations. The Rio Branco law was the first step toward abolition of slavery in Brazil. It was ultimately abolished on 13 May 1888 with the adoption of the Lei Áurea.

== See also ==
- Freedom of wombs
- Partus sequitur ventrem
- Slave Trade Acts
- Post-abolition in Brazil
- Saraiva-Cotegipe Law
