= General Assembly (Brazil) =

Bicameral parliament of the Empire of Brazil

General Assembly of the Empire of Brazil Assembleia Geral do Império do Brasil
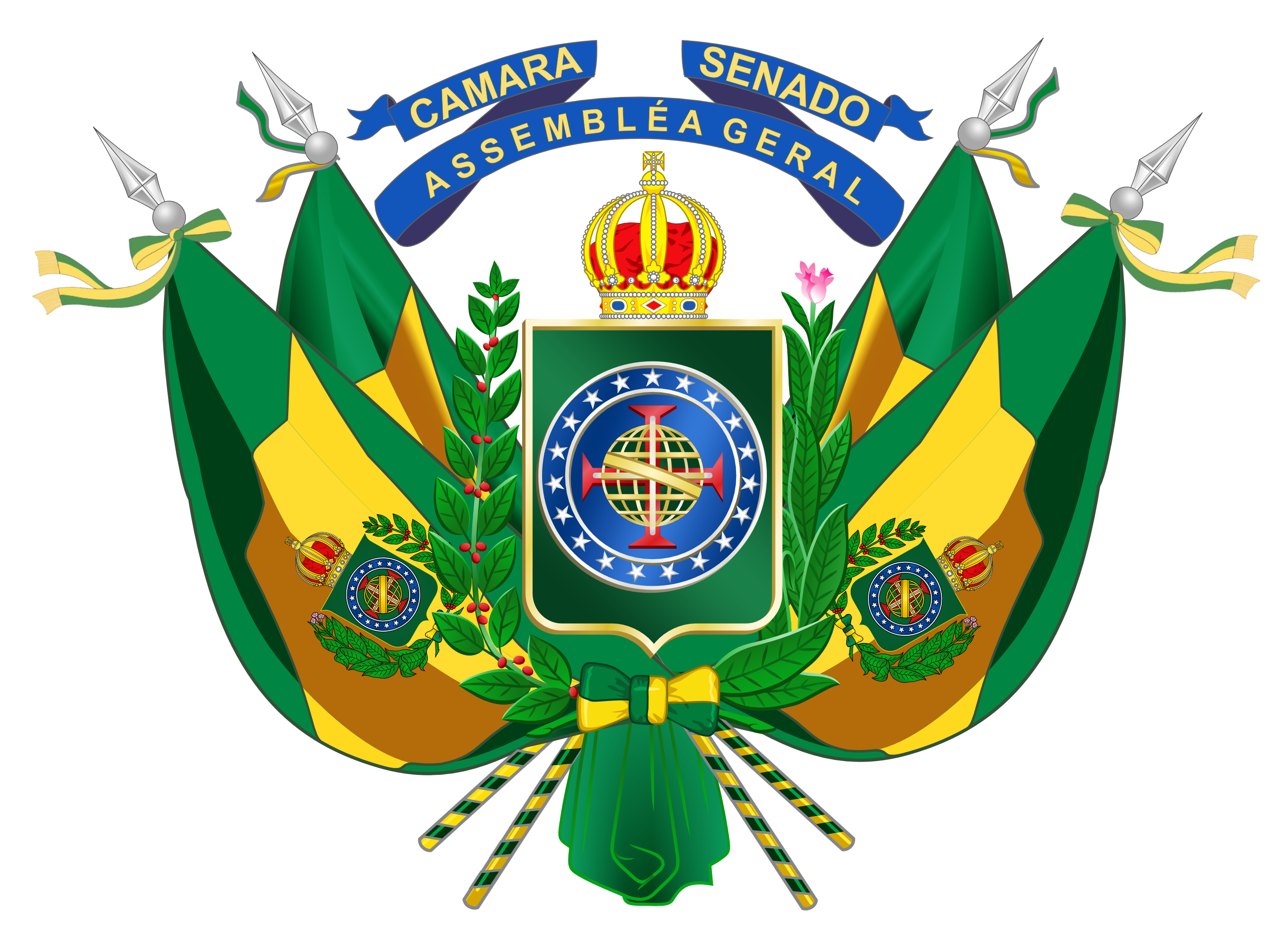

Type
- Type: Bicameral
- Houses: Senate; Chamber of Deputies

History
- Founded: 6 May 1826
- Succeeded by: National Congress

Leadership
- President of the Senate: Marquess of Santo Amaro (first); Paulino de Sousa (last)
- President of the Chamber of Deputies: Pereira da Nóbrega (first); Baron of Lucena (last)
- Seats: 125 deputies and 50 senators

Elections
- Last Senate election: 1889 (The Constitution determined that the Prince Imperial of Brazil would have a seat in the senate when he turned 25 and the election to the senate took place on a triple list from which of the 3 most voted the emperor made one official).
- Last Chamber election: 1889

Meeting place
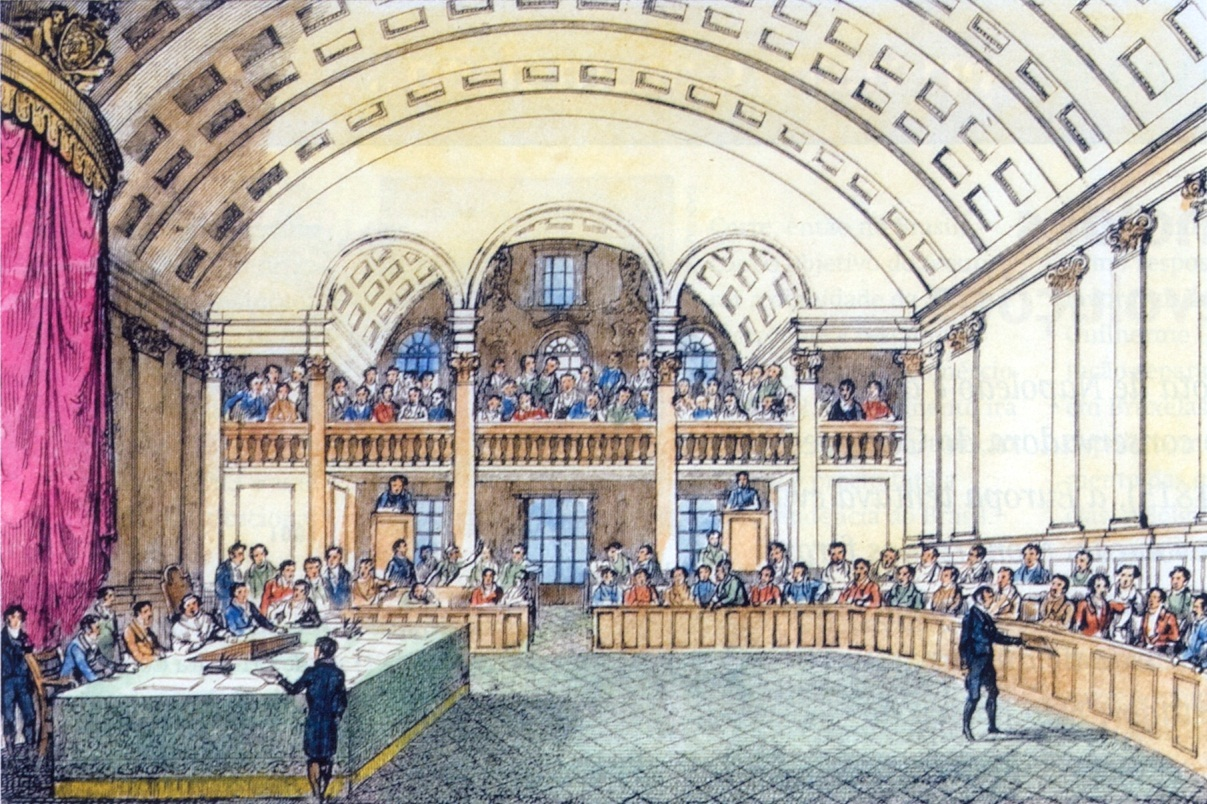
- Painting by Robert Walsh showing the Chamber of Deputies in 1830.

Constitution
- Brazilian Constitution of 1824

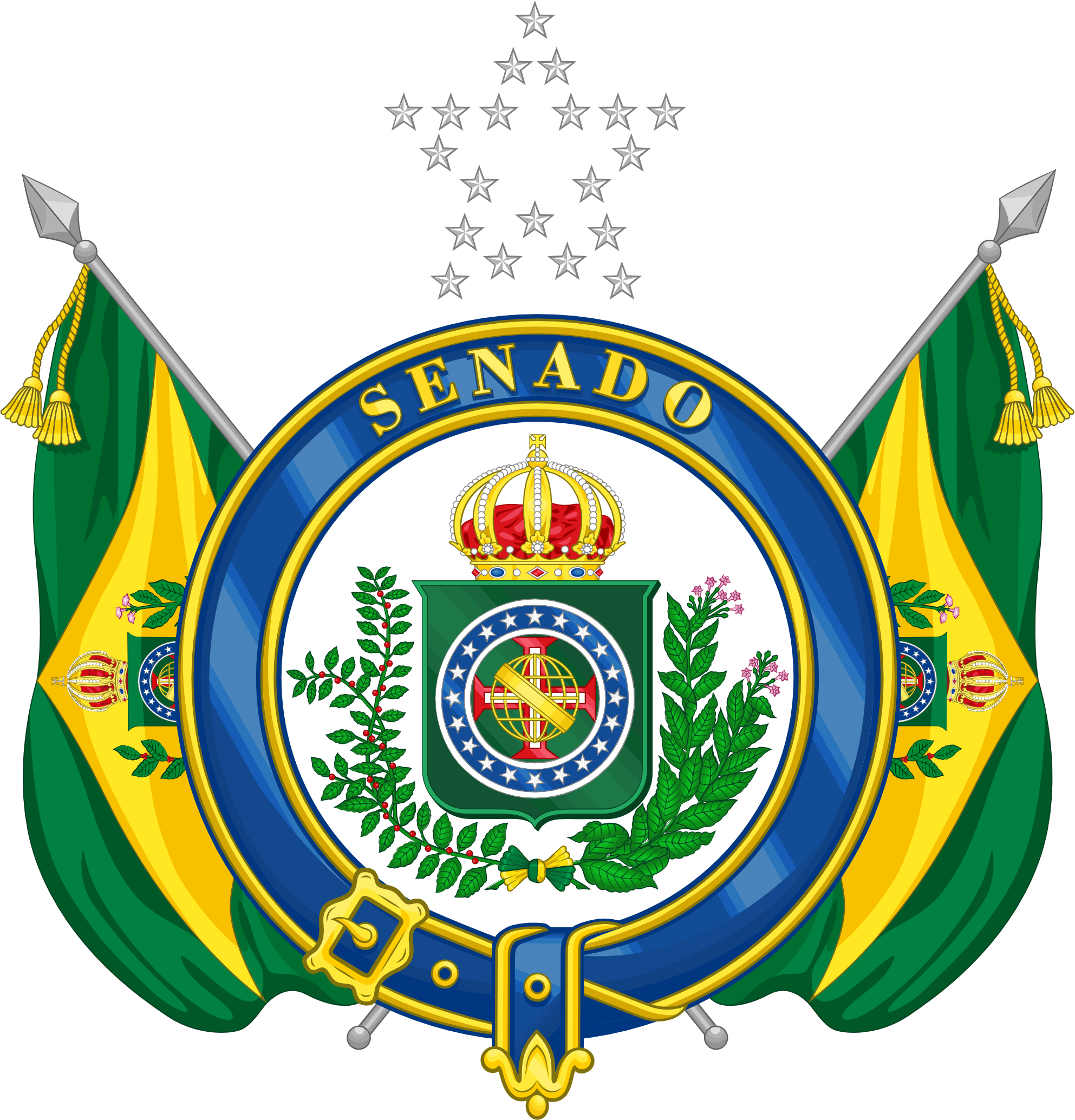
Coat of arms of the Senate

Seal of the Chamber of Deputies

The General Assembly was the bicameral parliament of the Empire of Brazil. Article 14 of the Imperial Constitution established the General Assembly, which consisted of the Chamber of Deputies (lower house) and the Senate (upper house).

Once the General Legislative Assembly had been convened, the first preparatory session of the Chamber of Deputies took place on April 29, 1826, and the opening session of the first legislature (joint meeting of the Chamber of Deputies and the Chamber of Senators) took place on May 6 of the same year.

== Assembly operations ==
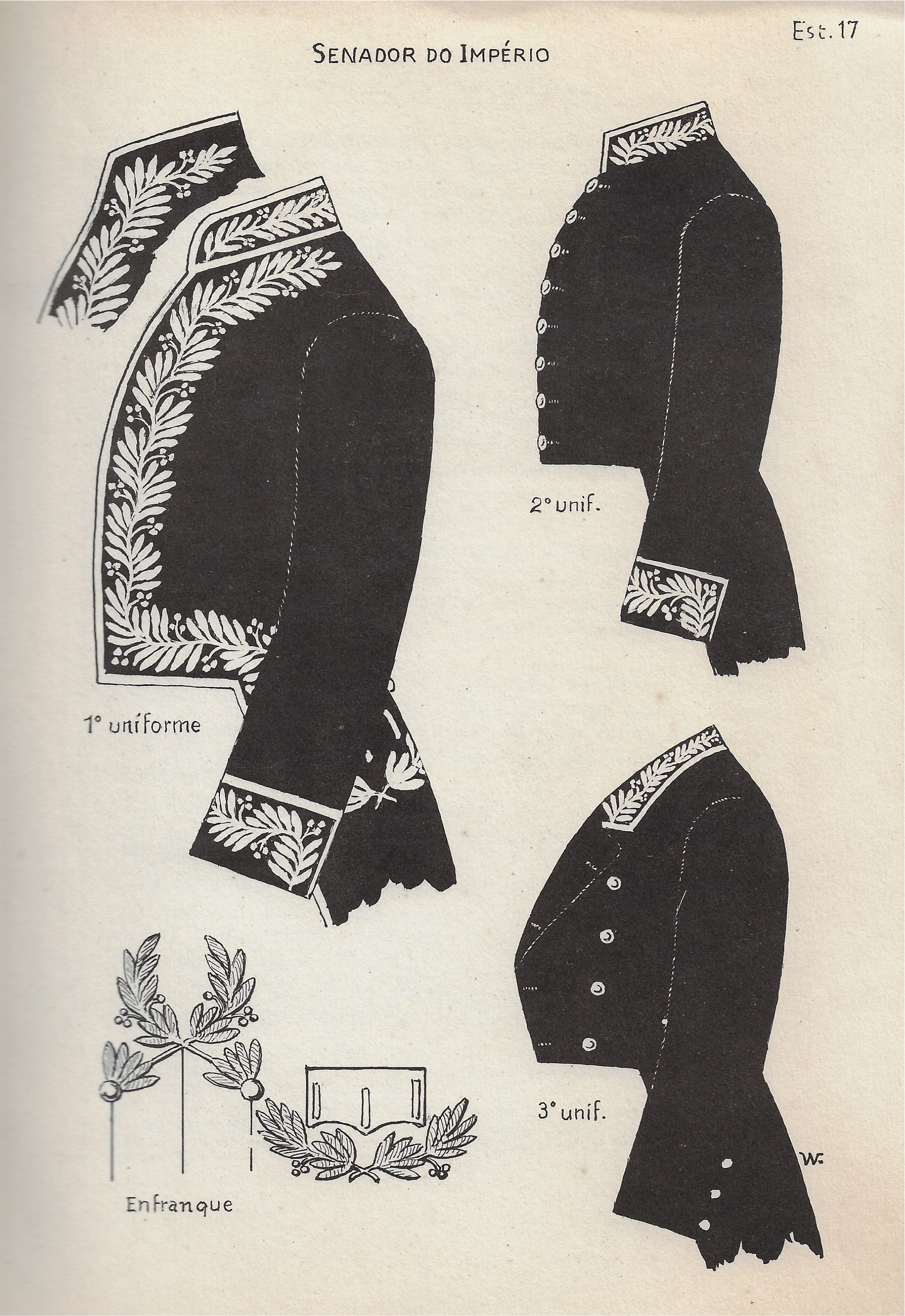
Official attire of Brazilian Senators in the 19th and early 20th centuries, made official by Imperial Decree No. 266 of January 19, 1843 (Imperial Museum Yearbook, 1950 edition)

The Constitution already expressly provided the possibility of the two chambers meeting together. The first of these meetings was for the swearing in of the Emperor, as well as the Regents, when this was the case, due to the monarch being underage or interdicted. The election of the Regent was also provided. Another possibility was the annual opening and closing sessions of the General Assembly, called imperial because of the Emperor's attendance. Finally, there would be a meeting of both Chambers when there was a disagreement over a proposition.

== Elections and length of term ==
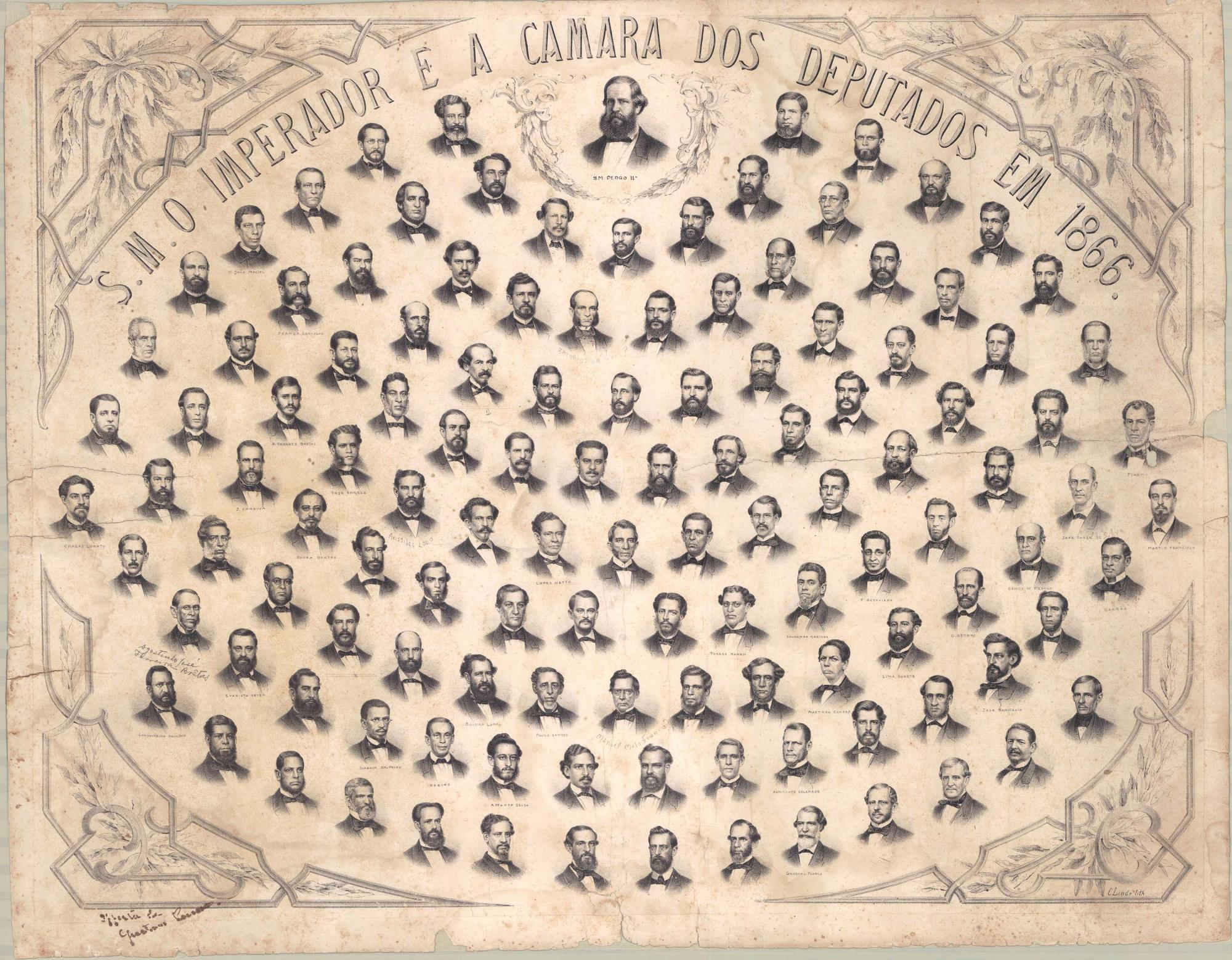
His Majesty the Emperor and the Chamber of Deputies in 1866, lithograph by Carlos Linde.

Senators and Deputies were elected indirectly until the electoral reform of 1881, when they were elected directly. The Senators were chosen in a direct election in which those voted for made up a triple list and from this the Emperor, as determined by the Brazilian Constitution of 1824, appointed one of the 3 who would have a lifetime mandate. The Deputies were elected by the electoral Parishes and had a 3-year term.
