= André Rebouças =

Brazilian activist

André Pinto Rebouças
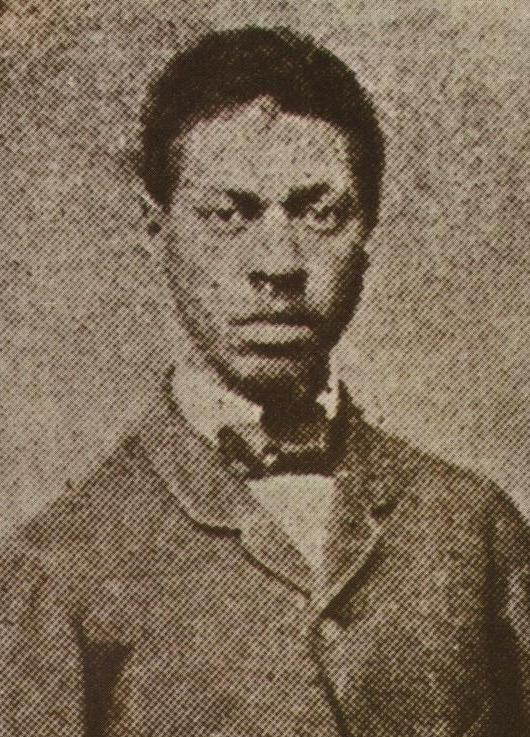
- André Rebouças, c.1862
- Born: 13 January 1838; Cachoeira, Bahia, Empire of Brazil
- Died: 9 April 1898 (aged 60); Funchal, Madeira, Kingdom of Portugal
- Engineering career
- Discipline: Civil

André Pinto Rebouças (13 January 1838 – 9 April 1898) was a Brazilian military engineer, abolitionist and inventor, son of Antônio Pereira Rebouças (1798–1880) and Carolina Pinto Rebouças. Lawyer, member of Parliament (representing the Brazilian state of Bahia) and an adviser to Pedro II of Brazil, his father was the son of a manumitted slave and a Portuguese tailor. His brothers Antônio Pereira Rebouças Filho and José Rebouças were also engineers.

== Mulatto father ==
Despite racial prejudice, his father, a mulatto, was an important and prestigious man at the time. Self-taught to read and write, he had been granted the right to practice law throughout the country, represented Bahia in the Chamber of Deputies on a range of legislatures, was secretary of the Provincial Governorship of Sergipe, advisor to the emperor, and had received the title of Knight of the Imperial Order of the Southern Cross in 1823.

== Improving the water supply of Rio de Janeiro ==
Rebouças became famous in Rio de Janeiro, at the time capital of the Empire of Brazil, solving the trouble of water supply, bringing it from fountain-heads outside the town.

== Creation of a torpedo for the Paraguayan War ==
Serving as a military engineer during the Paraguayan War in Paraguay, Rebouças successfully developed a torpedo.

== Abolitionism ==
Alongside Machado de Assis, José do Patrocínio and Cruz e Souza, Rebouças was a very important middle class representative with African descent, he also was one of the most important voices for the abolition of slavery in Brazil.

In the 1880s, Rebouças began to participate actively in the abolitionist cause, he helped to create the Brazilian Anti-Slavery Society, alongside Joaquim Nabuco, José do Patrocínio and others.

== Patronage ==
He encouraged the career of Antônio Carlos Gomes, author of the opera O Guarani.

== Exile and employment by The Times ==
After the Republican coup d'État, Rebouças went into exile with Pedro II to Europe. For two years he stayed exiled in Lisbon, as a correspondent for The Times of London. In 1892, facing financial problems, Rebouças went to Luanda and after that, Funchal, in Madeira.

== Suicide by falling down a cliff ==
According to Gaspar, in 1898 Rebouças' body was found at the shoreline at the base of a 60-meter-high cliff near the hotel where he lived. He supposedly committed suicide.

== Oil tanker named after Rebouças ==
In 2015, the Brazilian company Estaleiro Atlantico Sul built a crude oil tanker which shares the name André Rebouças. The ship currently sails under the Brazilian flag.
