= José do Patrocínio =

Brazilian writer and journalist (1854–1905)

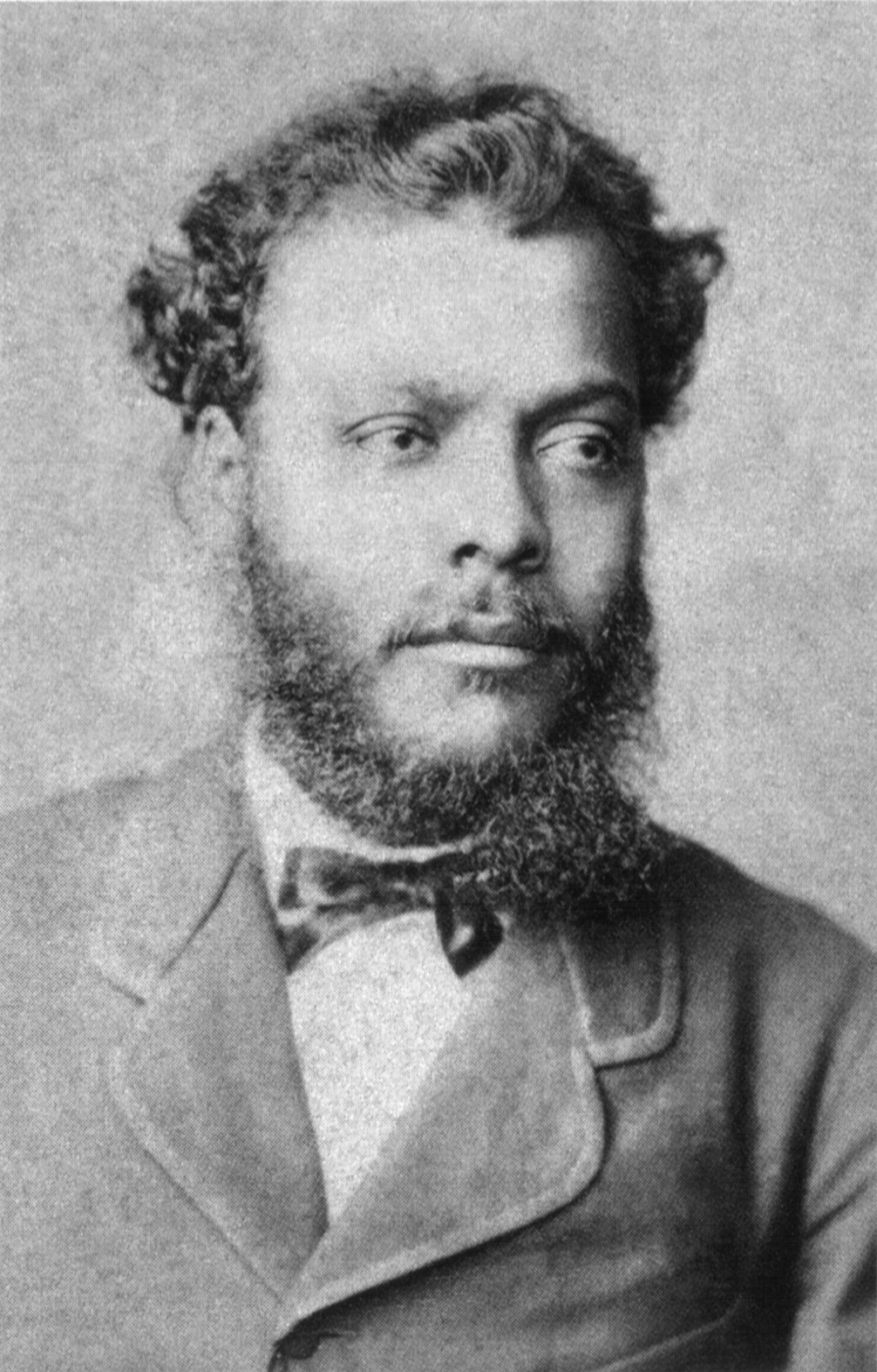
- Photograph by Alberto Henschel
- Born: 9 October 1854; Campos dos Goytacazes, Rio de Janeiro, Empire of Brazil
- Died: 29 January 1905 (aged 50); Rio de Janeiro, Rio de Janeiro, Brazil
- Occupations: Writer, pharmacist, activist, orator, journalist
- Spouse: Maria Henriqueta Sena
- Writing career
- Pen name: Proudhomme, Notus Ferrão
- Notable work: Mota Coqueiro, ou A Pena de Morte

José Carlos do Patrocínio (9 October 1854 – 29 January 1905) was a Brazilian writer, journalist, activist, orator and pharmacist. He was among the most well-known proponents of the abolition of slavery in Brazil, and known as "Tigre da Abolição" (The Tiger of Abolition). He founded and occupied the 21st chair of the Brazilian Academy of Letters from 1897 until his death in 1905.

== Life ==
José do Patrocínio was born on 9 October 1854 in the city of Campos dos Goytacazes, to João Carlos Monteiro, a vicar and politician, and Justina do Espírito Santo, a young freed slave from Elmina, Ghana. João Carlos did not legally recognize his son, but he did partially subsidize his education in pharmacy school.

After finishing school, Patrocínio went to Rio de Janeiro, where he served as a bricklayer during the construction of the Santa Casa da Misericórdia. He became interested in medicine and began studying at the Faculty of Medicine of Rio de Janeiro, graduating in pharmacy in 1874. However, Patrocínio could not find a home to live in after his graduation. A friend of his invited him to live in the neighborhood of São Cristóvão, where he stayed at the house of a rich laird and captain named Emiliano Rosa Sena. Later entering a Republican club, he met Quintino Bocaiuva, Lopes Trovão and Pardal Mallet, among others.

He soon fell in love with Sena's daughter, Maria Henriqueta, whom he affectionately called "Bibi". Although Emiliano initially disapproved their relationship, he later complied with it. With Sena's permission, Patrocínio married Bibi in 1879.

During this period, Patrocínio began his journalistic career. He founded, alongside Demerval da Fonseca, a journal named Os Ferrões (The Stings). Fonseca used the pen name "Eurus Ferrão", while Patrocínio used "Notus Ferrão". In 1879, he became a contributing editor for the journal Gazeta de Notícias, where he wrote articles under the pen name "Prudhomme". Within a short time his abolitionist writings increased the daily circulation of the paper from 2,000 to 12,000 copies. In 1880 he founded an Abolitionist society, called the Confederação Abolicionista (Abolitionist Confederation), alongside Joaquim Nabuco. He and its members (such as André Rebouças and Aristides Lobo) were famous for buying manumissions for slaves.

== Political Activism ==
In 1877, Patrocínio stated that he had been writing the column Semana Parlamentar (Parliamentary Week) under the pseudonym Prudhomme. In 1879 he began using the column to campaign for the abolition of slavery in Brazil. In this same time period, other notable Brazilian journalists and speakers, including André Rebouças, Nicolaou Joaquim Moreira, and Vicente da Souza formed the group Central Emancipation Association. Patrocínio then began to work with this association.

On September 7, 1880, along with Joaquim Nabuco and André Rebouças, Patricínio founded the Brazilian Anti-Slavery Society. After the death of Ferreira de Meneses in 1881, who was the owner of the newspaper Gazeta da Tarde (Afternoon Gazette), Patricínio bought the newspaper. As previously mentioned, in May 1883, he organized the Abolitionist Confederation, bringing together all abolitionist groups throughout Brazil. He then wrote and signed their manifesto together with João Clapp, André Rebouças, and Aristides Lobo. At this point in time, Patricínio's work was not just limited to writing: he also prepared and aided the escapes of slaves as well as coordinated fundraisers to raise funds to help pay for their freedom. He did this by holding live events, rallies in theaters, demonstrations in the public square, etc.

In 1885, he visited his hometown, Campos dos Goytacazes, where he was welcomed in triumph. When he returned to Rio de Janeiro, he brought with him his aging and sick mother who would pass away at the end of year. Her funeral became an important political moment in favor of abolition, attended by notable figures such as Minister Rodolfo Dantas, jurist Rui Barbosa, and future presidents Campos Sales and Prudente de Morais.

The following year in 1886, he entered politics and was elected to the Rio de Janeiro city council in a landslide victory

He was involved with Freemasonry and their efforts to end slavery. He continued to work with the Brazilian Anti-slavery Society, supporting their efforts to gain momentum for the abolitionist cause with the Brazilian Parliament and white elites.

In September 1887, he left the Gazeta da Tarde to found and direct a new newspaper, A Cidade do Rio (Rio City). He used his position at the helm of this newspaper to intensify his political activity. Many of the most important journalists of the time made contributions to this paper and they were often encouraged by Patrocinio himself. It was while he was at this paper, that after ten years of intense activism, he learned of the abolition of slavery in Brazil on May 13, 1888. Soon after the signing of the Lei Aurea, the law that officially ended slavery, Patricinio went to the Imperial Palace that was in the midst of massive celebrations, and approached Princess Isabel. He kneeled in front of her and kissed her hand. Many other abolitionists followed him and did the same.

After abolition was finally achieved, public opinion and attention turned to the fight for a republican government. However, because of his appreciation to Isabel for her support for abolition, A Cidade do Rio and even Patrocínio himself became supporters of the monarchy. During this period, he became an “Isabelista”, or someone who supported the reign of the Princess Isabel. He also helped organize the Guarda Negra (Black Guard), a group of freed slaves that violently attacked pro-republican rallies. They were notable for their adoration of and devotion to Isabel, known as Isabelism, and fought against opponents of a possible third reign.

At the time of the establishment of a republican government on November 15, 1889, Patricínio was serving as a city councilman in Rio de Janeiro. He read the official proclamation on the establishment of the republic to a group gathered at city hall while Marshal Deodoro da Fonseca was sick and away from city hall.

After the foundation of the Republic in 1889, Patrocínio came into conflict with the government of Marshal Floriano Peixoto over Patricínio’s support for the Navy Revolt against the newly established republic. He was arrested and sent to Cucuí on the upper Rio Negro, in the state of Amazonas and A Cidade do Rio was suspended by the government.

He quietly returned to Rio de Janeiro in 1893, but with a state of emergency still in effect, the publication of A Cidade do Rio remained suspended. Without any source of income, Patrocíno went to live in the suburbs in Inhaúma.

== Literary Works ==
Patrocínio published a series of first-hand accounts of what he saw in northeast Brazil during a severe drought in the late 1870's. The accounts were entitled Viagem ao Norte (Journey to the North) and published in the newspaper Gazeta da Notícias from May to August 1879 and detailed the extreme suffering of the inhabitants at that time. His accounts brought public attention to the grave situation developing in the far away northeast.

Soon after, in 1879 Patrocínio published many of his accounts as the novel Os Retirantes (The Migrants). The novel further details the plight of many Brazilians from the northeast as they were forced to migrate south due to severe drought. It also explores themes of extreme poverty and violence against women. The novel had a major impact on the local literary scene and helped create the genre of "literature of the drought" (literatura da seca) that explored the same themes in the following decades.

== Death ==
Patrocínio remained an active journalist after his exile up to his death on 29 January 1905, at the age of 50. He died during a speech in honor of Alberto Santos-Dumont at the Teatro Lírico in Rio de Janeiro, due to hemoptysis. His funeral procession was attended by approximately 10,000 people.

== List of Works ==
- Mota Coqueiro, ou A Pena de Morte (1877)
- Os Retirantes (1879)
- Pedro Espanhol (1884)

== Representations in popular culture ==
Patrocínio was portrayed by Antonio Pitanga in the 1969 telenovel Sangue do Meu Sangue, by Kadu Karneiro in its 1995 remake, by Valter Santos in the 1988 miniseries Abolição and by Maurício Gonçalves in the 1999 miniseries Chiquinha Gonzaga.

Preceded by Joaquim Serra (patron)	Brazilian Academy of Letters - Occupant of the 21st chair 1897 — 1905	Succeeded by Mário de Alencar
