= Second reign (Empire of Brazil) =

Historical period of Brazil (1840–1889)

- 1840–1889
Regency period	Republic of the Sword
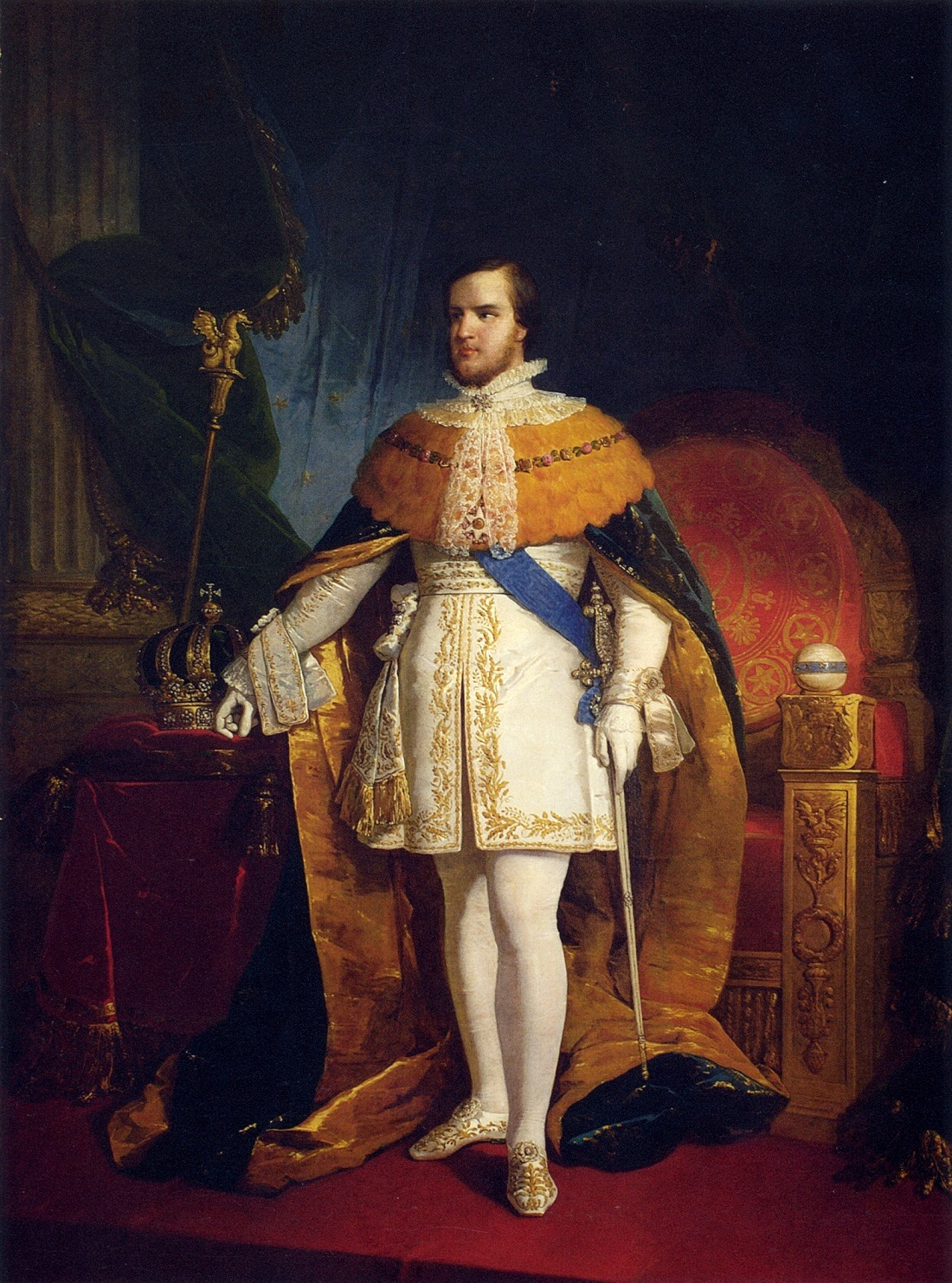
- Emperor Pedro II in his majestic costume with imperial insignia
- Key events: Declaration of age of Pedro II; Paraguayan War; Proclamation of the Republic

The Second Reign is a period of history within the Empire of Brazil that lasted 49 years, beginning with the end of the regency period on 23 July 1840, upon the declaration of Pedro de Alcântara's majority, and ending on 15 November 1889, when the parliamentary constitutional monarchy in force was removed by the proclamation of the republic.

The Second Reign represented a period of great cultural progress and significance for Brazil, with the growth and consolidation of the Brazilian nation as an independent country and as an important member of the American nations. This era witnessed the consolidation of the country's army and navy, culminating in the Paraguayan War in 1865, and profound changes in the social sphere, such as the gradual abolition of slavery and the encouragement of European immigration to join the Brazilian workforce.

The visual arts, literature and theater also flourished during this period. Although heavily influenced by European styles ranging from Neoclassicism to Romanticism, each concept was adapted to create a genuinely Brazilian culture. The expansion of the urbanization of the big cities, the large-scale construction of railroads, aimed at mobilizing the flow of consumer goods more efficiently, and the interiorization of the country also happened during the Second Reign.

Other examples of this historical period are the introduction of electric telegraphs lines that interconnected the Brazilian provinces and other South American countries; steamships lines that updated the merchant and war navies and, in 1877, the acquisition of the first telephone sets. The second half of the 19th century was marked by an incipient Brazilian modernization based on basic principles: the coffee economy in the Southeast, the end of the slave trade and the gradual extinction of slavery, the replacement of the old slave system with paid labor, and incentives for the country's industry to develop and assume, by the end of the Second Reign, an important position.

It is historically incorrect to refer to this period as the "Second Empire", since Brazil had a single continuous imperial period, divided into the First and Second Reigns and separated by a 9-year span known as the regency period, which was the most troubled moment in Brazilian history.

== Majority of Pedro II ==
=== Triumviral Regency and Single Regency ===
Pedro I, the first emperor of Brazil, abdicated the Brazilian throne on 7 April 1831 in favor of his son Pedro de Alcântara, the future Pedro II, who became emperor at the age of five. The act marked the end of the First Reign and the beginning of the regency period in Brazil. Since Pedro II was still a minor, a Provisional Triumviral Regency was convened on 17 July 1831, and had a representative of the country's three major political groups: the liberals (senator Campos Vergueiro), the conservatives (José Joaquim Carneiro de Campos) and the military (general Francisco de Lima e Silva). They were responsible for holding elections to choose the Permanent Triumviral Regency, where Bráulio Muniz, Costa Carvalho and general Lima e Silva were elected, ruling the country for three years. In the meantime, Minister of Justice Diogo Feijó gained enough political influence to approve the Additional Act in 1834, which abolished the Triumviral Regency and instituted a single one. Feijó was elected in democratic elections, but the Additional Act failed, increasing the rivalries between the political factions in the provinces.

=== End of the regency ===
Regent Feijó was a democrat and a federalist. The Addictional Act created Legislative Assemblies to give greater autonomy to the Brazilian provinces, which led to decentralization. It also granted the city of Rio de Janeiro the status of a neutral municipality. However, since Feijó was unable to control the popular revolts, he resigned. Pedro de Araújo Lima, the Marquess of Olinda, a more centralizing and less liberal politician, was then elected in his place. During Olinda's regency, Pedro II was declared "of age" by the Senate.

According to historian Roderick J. Barman, by 1840 "they [the regents] had lost all faith in their ability to govern the country on their own. They accepted Pedro II as an authority figure whose presence was indispensable for the country's survival". Some of these politicians (who would form the Conservative Party in 1840) believed that a neutral figure, who could rise above political factions and petty interests to deal with discontent and moderate disputes, was necessary. They envisioned an emperor who would be more dependent on the legislature than the constitutional monarch conceived by Pedro I, but with more powers than those defended at the beginning of the regency by their rivals (who later formed the Liberal Party). However, the Liberals managed to introduce an initiative to bring forward Pedro II's age of majority from 18 to 14 years, and in July 1840 the emperor was declared ready to rule.

== Reverse parliamentarism and the first years ==
=== Alves Branco Tariff ===
On 12 August 1844, the tariff policy known by the name of its creator (Manuel Alves Branco) was implemented, increasing customs duties to 30% on imported goods without a national equivalent, and 60% on products with a national equivalent. This measure affected around three thousand imported items, triggering protests not only from British businessmen, but also from importers in Brazil and the wealthier classes, who began to pay more for the imported items they needed. Although the tariff's goal was simply to increase the government's revenue, the measure ended up promoting the growth of new national economic activities. This tax increase lasted until the mid-1860s, when the imperial government, under pressure from exporting groups, reduced tariffs to alleviate Brazil's fiscal deficit, caused mainly by the Cisplatine War.

With the tariff, the percentage of GDP to maintain the Empire through taxation was 13%, and remained so until the mid-1930s. Most of the taxes came from customs through the import of international products. Comparatively, in 2015, taxes in Brazil accounted for 35% of GDP.

=== Creation of the Brazilian parliamentary model ===
In England, the parliamentary system was a consequence of the Glorious Revolution of 1688–1689, which marked the triumph of Parliament over the King, putting an end to the absolutist monarchy in England. The leader of Parliament then became the head of government, i.e. the Prime Minister. The first to occupy this position was Sir Robert Walpole, who began to govern through a system he developed, called cabinet system, since the members of the government met in a room known as a "cabinet". Currently, the system works as follows: the leader of the ruling parliamentary party works together with a group of like-minded colleagues to get laws passed in parliament and, for practical purposes, govern the country. When the ruling party loses control, the opposition party appoints a new prime minister and a new cabinet. Back then, the existing parties were the Tories and the Whigs.

In Brazil, the Emperor was the ultimate power, accumulating the functions of head of state and government until the 1840s, when he decreed that the Emperor no longer had both powers, but only the moderating.

In 1847, D. Pedro II created the Council of Ministers, a department that would advise the monarch on the administration of Brazil, similar to British parliamentarism, but with a reversed hierarchy; hence the name "reverse parliamentarism".

in the same year, the post of President of the Council of Ministers (Prime minister) was also created, who would be the head of the ministry and in charge of organizing the Government Cabinet. Instead of appointing all the ministers, the Emperor appointed only the President of the council, who chose the other members of the Ministry, removing an aspect of political tension from Pedro II, without diminishing his authority.

D. Pedro II managed to create an efficient mechanism for running Brazil, based on the exchange of favors, a fact that can be considered admissible in politics, but that made the monarchy last only as long as the support of its economic elite lasted. Since the agricultural elite held power in Brazil in the 19th century, Pedro II always ruled by allying himself with them, granting favors (such as building railroads, dams, acquiring machinery, etc.) in exchange for the structure that he needed to stay in power. In this way, D. Pedro II succeeded, over the 49 years of his rule, in dealing with a stable and, from a certain point of view, prosperous Brazil.

=== The Conservative and Liberal parties ===
Two important political parties were established: the Liberals (in favor of strong local power, with autonomy for the provinces) and the Conservatives (in favor of a stronger central power), both representing landowners. Foreign policy would become a priority for Pedro II, who sought to prevent the strengthening of Argentina, Uruguay and Paraguay, to balance the Plata region. Pedro II intervened, politically or militarily, in his neighbors in the Southern Cone region whenever he felt they were strategically important to Brazil's interests.

The Conservatives preached a political system where government authorities should act impartially, guaranteeing the freedom of all citizens; they supported centralized government and desired the achievements of progress. This party became known in the 1840s as "Saquarema", after the name of the municipality in Rio de Janeiro where the farms of one of its main leaders, José Rodrigues Torres, Viscount of Itaboraí, were located. In addition, the Conservatives had a strong regional base in Bahia and Pernambuco, where the landowning sector had experienced struggles for regional autonomy with popular content.

The Liberals, on the other hand, supported the independence of the provinces with a stronger parliamentary government, the abdication of the moderating power and the senate's lifelong mandate, the abolition of slavery and the biennial election of deputies. The Liberals were called "Luzias", a name derived from the village of Santa Luzia, located on the Das Velhas River in Minas Gerais, where a battle of the Liberal revolt in Minas Gerais, suppressed by General Luís Alves de Lima e Silva, then Baron of Caxias, happened. They had a strong base in the provinces of Minas Gerais, São Paulo and Rio Grande do Sul. In the latter two, the autonomy of the upper classes was a tradition. In Minas Gerais, the idea of decentralized autonomy came from both rural landowners and the urban population of the old mining towns.

The two parties didn't respect each other; each had its own press, which they used to attack their opponents. Both were created during the regency period (Conservative in 1836 and Liberal in 1831), but reached the height of their popularity during the Second Reign, with D. Pedro II remaining neutral between the two, although always vigilant, advising the conciliation of their ideas.

=== Moderating Power ===
The moderating power was a legal device present in the first Brazilian constitution (Art. 98 of the 1824 Constitution), granted by Emperor D. Pedro I in March 1824, which was based on the political ideals of Benjamin Constant (1767–1830) about a neutral power capable of adjusting and regulating the other three classic branches: executive, legislative and judiciary. The moderating power, the main political organization of the Empire, was initially considered an authoritarian and centralizing mechanism, which led to revolts in some provinces during the regency.

Although the moderating power became popular in Brazil after Constant, it is important to emphasize that the concept adopted in the country was different from the one expressed in the book Cours de Politique Constitutionelle. Based on Montesquieu's theory of the English system of parliamentarianism and the division of the three powers, Constant supported the idea of a neutral or moderating power in the constitutional monarchy, which would not be subject to party political disputes and would be exercised by the king. According to him, the moderating power was an important resource for moments of crisis, since it should be a conciliatory element in conflicts between the other powers.

The division of powers established in the 1824 Constitution was based on four theoretically equal parts. The moderating power was exercised solely by the emperor and had total autonomy over the other three powers. Its definition is described in Article 98 of the 1824 Constitution, which reads as follows:

The moderating power is the key to all political organization, and is reserved to the Emperor, as Supreme Head of the Nation, and its First Representative, so that he may incessantly watch over the maintenance of the independence, balance, and harmony of the other political powers.

In other words, the moderating power served as a restraining and counterbalancing element to guarantee the coherence of the other powers in terms of the prosperity of the nation. Article 101 of the 1824 Constitution established the way in which the Emperor could exercise the moderating power:

Art. 101. The Emperor exercises the moderating power:

1. Appointing Senators in accordance with Art. 43;
2. Summoning the General Assembly extraordinarily during recesses when the interests of the Empire demand it;
3. Approving the decrees and resolutions of the General Assembly, so that they have the force of law;
4. Approving and temporarily suspending the resolutions of the Provincial Councils;
5. Extending or postponing the General Assembly and dissolving the Chamber of Deputies, in cases where the salvation of the State requires it, immediately convening another to replace it;
6. Freely appointing and dismissing ministers of state;
7. Suspending magistrates in the cases set out in Article 15;
8. Forgiving and moderating the sentences imposed on defendants convicted by sentence;
9. Granting amnesty in urgent cases where humanity and the good of the State so advise;

The issue of the moderating power, along with the senate for life and the Council of State, divided opinion in the 1830s. In the following two decades, the topic was not particularly relevant in national political debates. However, after the election of 1860, when the Liberal Party won significant victories in Minas Gerais and Rio de Janeiro, the issue of the moderating power resurfaced on the political scene. This happened when the Emperor rejected Teófilo Ottoni's name for the Senate, although he was first on the triple list. From then on, the liberals demanded that the Emperor's actions be approved by the Ministry. This liberal point of view was expressed by Antônio Carlos Ribeiro de Andrada Machado e Silva, in a statement made in 1841:

In representative governments, the monarch is inviolable. However, inviolability cannot exist when he governs; in representative governments, the monarch does nothing wrong, and he cannot stop doing wrong if he is to govern.

The moderating power was defended by Paulino José Soares de Sousa, Viscount of Uruguay, in his work Ensaio sobre o Direito Administrativo (1862). The work, inspired by eclecticism, stated that the institution plays a role in the balance and harmony of the political system. According to him: "[...] If the nation is divided into combative parties, if an oppressive party is in power, there will be no higher, independent power, above the passions, that is of value to the oppressed".

== Consolidation and military campaigns ==
=== End of the Ragamuffin Revolution ===
The Ragamuffin War was still active in the south of Brazil when Pedro II became Emperor, reaching alarming proportions and getting close to being independent from the rest of the country, such as the province of Cisplatina. To prevent this from happening, Pedro II appointed Luís Alves de Lima e Silva, Baron of Caxias – who had previously suppressed the revolts in Minas and São Paulo – as Commander-in-Chief of the Army. In addition to his leadership of the army, the baron was awarded the title of President of the province of Rio Grande do Sul.

Despite having the liberty to act violently against the protestors, Caxias, in a smart decision, used diplomacy, negotiating with the leaders and making patriotic statements to the insurgents. On several occasions, he mentioned that the enemy of the revolution was not Pedro II and the Brazilians, but Manuel Oribe and Juan Manuel de Rosas, the respective presidents of Uruguay and Argentina, who sought to unite the two republics to create a very powerful state in the Plata region. The negotiations and revolts ended in 1845 with the signing of the Treaty of Poncho Verde. The Baron of Caxias was named "Peacemaker of Brazil" and given the title of Count.

=== Praieira Revolt ===
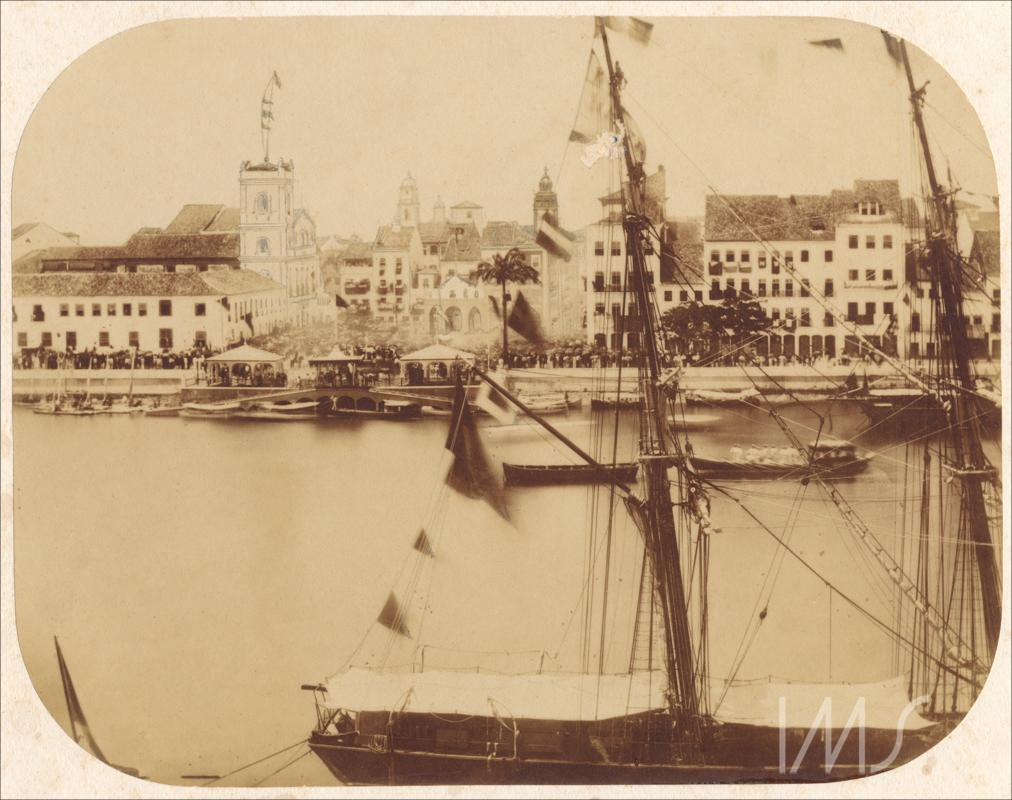
D. Pedro II landing in Recife, province of Pernambuco, in 1859, about a decade after the end of the Praieira Revolt, the biggest and last insurrection of the Second Reign.

The Praieira revolt, also known as the Praieira Insurrection, Praieira Revolution or simply Praieira, was a liberal and separatist movement that occurred in the province of Pernambuco between 1848 and 1850. The revolt, which was the last of the provincial riots, is linked to the party-political struggles that marked the regency period and the beginning of the Second Reign. Its defeat was a demonstration of the power of D. Pedro II's government.

In addition to dissatisfaction with the imperial government, a large part of Pernambuco's population was unhappy with the concentration of land and political power in the province, which was the most important in the Northeast. In this context, the Praia Party was created to oppose the Liberal Party and the Conservative Party, both dominated by two powerful families who made political deals with each other. There was a series of disputes over power until, on November 7, 1848, the armed conflict began. In Olinda, the leaders of the protest launched the Manifesto to the World and began to fight against the troops of the imperial government, which intervened and put an end to the largest and last insurrection of the Second Reign.

At the local level, the revolt was influenced by the liberal ideas of those who complained about the lack of provincial autonomy and characterized by a repudiation of the monarchy, with demonstrations in favor of political independence, the republic and radical reformism. Overall, it was included in the list of liberal, socialist and nationalist revolutions that spread across Europe during the 19th century, including the 1848 Revolution in France, which ended absolutism in the country.

=== Christie Question ===
==== Background ====
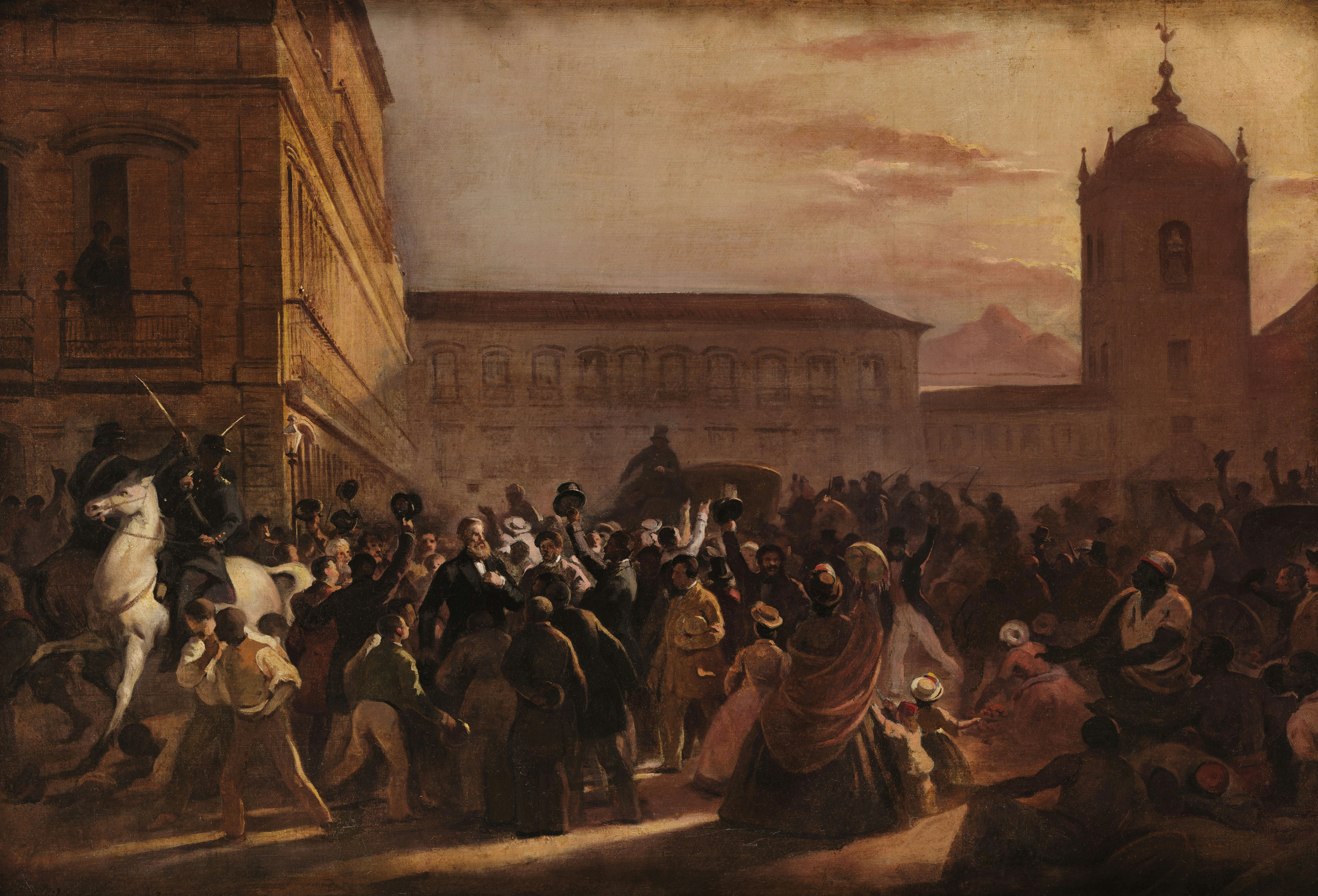
The Christie Question (1862 to 1865): the diplomatic conflict and near-war between the Brazilian Empire and the British Empire.

The implementation of the Aberdeen Act of August 8, 1845, and the approval of the Eusébio de Queirós Law (September 4, 1850), designed to restrict the slave trade to Brazil, resulted in the intensification of the trade and the growth of anti-British feeling in Brazil. Although the conservative leader Eusébio de Queirós had defended to the legislators the need to decide for themselves to cease trafficking and to preserve the image of a sovereign nation, the influence of Great Britain was not hidden from public opinion.

Although the treaty reduced tensions between the two countries regarding the reduction of the slave trade, the perception of the agreement as a national humiliation would influence future events.

==== The crisis ====
In 1861, the British ship Prince of Wales was shipwrecked off the coast of Rio Grande do Sul. Much of the cargo of carbon, ceramics, textiles, olive oil and wine was looted and the British ambassador demanded that Brazil pay compensation.

In 1862, three troublemakers were arrested for drunkenness in Rio de Janeiro, then the capital of Brazil. Upon being arrested, they were identified as British sailors and, due to the relationship between England and Brazil, they were released. However, the British ambassador to Brazil, William Dougal Christie, demanded that the Empire compensate England for the shameful arrest of the British ship Prince of Wales, the dismissal of the police officers who detained the British sailors and an official apology from the Emperor to the British crown.

The following year, as Brazil did not succumb to pressure, British ships blockaded the port of Rio de Janeiro and confiscated five ships at anchor. D. Pedro II, consenting to popular pressure, tried a diplomatic solution, calling on King Leopold I of Belgium to conduct an impartial negotiation. Leopold I favored Brazil and, as England refused to apologize, the Emperor terminated diplomatic relations with England in 1863. They only apologized in 1865, when it supported Brazil in the Paraguayan War and restored diplomatic relations. The government's victory in the dispute ended up strengthening Brazil's image abroad, as the country was still 40 years old and feared it would not be recognized by European countries. The other South American countries were experiencing similar problems.

== Economy, immigration and industrialization in the Second Reign ==
=== Economy ===
During the First Reign, Brazil's great agrarian elite (sugar cane barons) was concentrated in the Northeast region. However, at the same time, coffee was beginning to be introduced in the Baixada Fluminense and the Paraíba Valley, achieving rapid success in the 19th century. At the end of Brazil's gold rush, the coffee pioneers realized that it was a highly profitable investment, as the land in the region was very cheap (sometimes free), the workforce was made up of slaves and, once planted, the coffee plantation was productive for twenty years. The international consumer market was also flourishing and coffee sales were almost certain. Within a few years, the coffee elite began to emerge in southeastern Brazil and soon became more powerful and wealthier than the northeastern elite.

The development of international trade based on coffee exports was the result of external and internal factors. Among the external factors, the following stand out: the growth in international demand for Brazilian coffee, the result of the increase in the quality of life of the North American and European population, which stimulated an increase in consumption levels; the industrialization of the United States and Europe, which needed raw materials for their processing industries; technical improvement, benefiting international trade, both in terms of transportation and new organization of the mercantile and financial sectors.

Internally, the factors that most favored economic growth were the solution to the labor problem through European immigration; the expansion of credit through a banking reform, which provided resources for the formation of new coffee plantations; and the expansion of railroad networks in São Paulo, which reduced the cost of transportation for the owners of the new plantations, located in the interior of São Paulo. The diversification of economic activities, in addition to boosting the expansion of the railway network, stimulated urbanization, once all the commercial activity, the first induced by the expansion of coffee, was concentrated in the port cities.

One problem with coffee plantations is the condition of the soil after the end of the coffee plantation's useful life, which makes coffee growers abandon their land to find new ones. In a few years, they began to migrate to the west of the province of São Paulo and, soon, this region began to depend on coffee, along with the imperial government, as a result of the high tax that was levied on the product.

Coffee was linked to industry, meaning that part of the profits generated from coffee cultivation were also used to set up factories. Production had fallen due to the Aberdeen Act, but Brazil continued to export the product to the British.

The Eusébio de Queirós Law of 1850 brought development to industries. The process, which had already begun with the repeal of the Manufacturing Prohibition Law – dated back to 1785, and one of the triggers for the outbreak of the Conjuração Mineira – upon the arrival of the royal family in Brazil, improved, since, at that time, the high investments made with the purchase of slaves were directed towards the mechanization of industry and the payment of wages. Brazilian industry effectively began with the investments made by the large slaveholders. Before the creation of the law, and even with the economic opening of 1822, there were small entrepreneurial manifestations, but no Brazilian industrialization.

=== Immigration ===
Since Brazil's independence, several laws have prohibited the international slave trade to Brazil, but it was only with military and political pressure from Great Britain and the actions of Minister Eusébio de Queirós from 1850 onwards that the Atlantic slave trade came to an end. As a result, Brazil began to consider attracting non-Portuguese immigrants. On the farms, the colonato system, a form of semi-salaried work where the immigrant and his family received a mixed wage (money and a piece of land to plant their own food), began to be used. The exhausting working hours and exploitation by the farmers caused the first immigrants to leave the coffee plantations for the urban centers, where they worked in commerce and industry.

The influx of African slaves into Brazil came to an abrupt end in 1850. The high infant mortality rate and the great disproportion between men and women resulted in the slave population reproducing very slowly. By 1880, the slave labor force was noticeably aging. In 1878, ten years before the abolition of slavery, the Agricultural Congress held in Rio de Janeiro brought together coffee growers to discuss the issue of the workforce, where they decided to facilitate the arrival of European immigrants.

From the 1870s onwards, Brazil's economic structure underwent major changes, which had an impact on existing social and political relations. Progressively, black slave labor lost space to immigrant wage labor in Brazilian agricultural plantations. Coffee was consolidating its position as Brazil's main export product, triggering a rush of economic growth like nothing before in independent Brazil. European immigration contributed to the urbanization of Brazilian society, and along with the wage labour, led to the emergence of an incipient internal market for popular consumer items in the country, which eventually resulted in the creation of the first industrial units in Brazil. Essentially, capitalism was taking hold in Brazil's socio-economic structures, overcoming the old mercantile-slavery system.

The transformations in Brazil's productive structure began with the accumulation of capital provided by the international coffee trade, enabling the reinvestment of profits obtained from the trade in the productive sector itself, as well as the replacement of slave labor by salaried labor in productive activities, motivated, among other factors, by the end of the slave trade in the Atlantic Ocean and by international pressure against slave exploitation in Brazil. Wage labor began with the introduction of European emigrant workforce into the country's productive activities, which created a national market for popular consumer items. On the other hand, since not all European immigrants to Brazil worked in coffee plantations, but also in commerce, services and handicrafts, there was space for the process of urbanization in Brazilian society, especially in the Southeast, as well as the creation of commercial banks in the country. All these factors, as well as public investment in infrastructure, especially in railroads and roads in the central area of the country (São Paulo, Rio de Janeiro and Minas Gerais), were crucial to the creation of the first industries in the country.

=== The Baron of Mauá and industrialization ===
Irineu Evangelista de Souza, the Baron of Mauá (1813–1889), was the first important figure among the industrial bourgeoisie in Brazilian history. His productive investments covered a wide range of sectors, from transportation to the creation of a bank, demonstrating the diversity of sectors in which he operated. He was a notable Brazilian businessman, industrialist, banker, politician and diplomat, a symbol of the country's entrepreneurs in the 19th century.

Born in Rio Grande do Sul, he moved to Rio de Janeiro as a teenager, where he began working for an import company. Later, he traveled to England where he experienced English urban and industrial society, which fascinated him. On his return to Brazil, he obtained a loan to buy a foundry in Niterói, Rio de Janeiro, that was transformed into a shipyard, where more than sixty steam and sailing ships were produced.

At that time, investments in industrial production were supported by the Alves Branco tariff, which increased the tax on imported products, stimulating production in the country and starting an industrialization spurt, which, although small, showed the country's investment potential.

The Baron of Mauá also created the Companhia de Rebocadores da Barra de Rio Grande, obtained the rights to traffic on the Amazon River for 30 years, and invested in tramway companies in Rio de Janeiro. He was one of the great promoters of the establishment of railroads in Brazil, with the aim of transporting the country's agricultural production faster. The first of these was the Mauá Railway, linking Rio de Janeiro to Paraíba Valley, whose construction license was granted in 1852.

The Baron of Mauá, together with the imperial government of D. Pedro II, also built a network of submarine telegraphs linking Brazil to Europe, invested in the Companhia de Gás do Rio de Janeiro to provide public lighting for the city, and also set up banks such as Mauá, MacGregor & Cia and Casa Mauá & Cia, with significant operations in Brazil, England, the United States and the Platine countries.

However, his industrialization projects clashed with the basis of the Brazilian economy at the time, whose slave labour did not allow for industrial development. His ideas against slavery were not well received by Brazilian landowners, which resulted in sabotage and attacks. Another factor that contributed to the bankruptcy of the Baron of Mauá was the reduction in the import tax with the Silva Ferraz tariff, which discouraged investment in Brazil and put the companies established here in direct competition with foreign companies.

== Slavery issue ==
=== International and personal pressure from the Emperor ===
Since the end of the 18th century, Europe had been experiencing changes in terms of individual freedoms, labor relations and, consequently, the end of slavery. England was the country that pressured Brazil the most. In the agreements signed in 1810 and, later, with the recognition clause for Brazil's independence, England requested the abolition of slavery in the country in the medium term but, until Pedro II assumed office, nothing effective had been done. After the signing of the Alves Branco tariff (1844), which increased taxes on imports and exports, the British crown decided to react by signing the Aberdeen Act, allowing British ships to seize slave ships crossing the Atlantic. They even invaded territorial waters and sometimes landed on Brazilian soil.

D. Pedro II found himself in a sensitive situation where he either had to take action against slavery or go to war with England. Personally, the Emperor was an outspoken abolitionist, considering slavery a "national disgrace". In 1850, Pedro II threatened to abdicate the throne if the General Assembly did not ban the Atlantic slave trade. In the same year, when the law to suppress the slave trade was being discussed, Pedro II, at the age of 25, replied vigorously: "I'd rather lose my crown than tolerate the continuation of the slave trade". As a result, in 1850, the Eusébio de Queirós law was passed by the Minister of Justice himself, Eusébio de Queirós, banning the slave trade in Brazil. With the new law, the situation in Brazil changed, as it became very difficult to acquire slave labor; the price of buying slaves from other estates became very high, and the coffee barons in the southeast were hit hardest. As their coffee plantations were booming, they needed more slaves to continue their production, acquiring thousands of them from sugar cane producers in the northeast.

Emperor D. Pedro II wanted to end slavery gradually to reduce the impact on the national economy and avoid revolts. He consciously ignored the increasing political damage to his image and to the monarchy as a result of his support for antislavery, since the figure of the monarch needed to be neutral on any issue. The Emperor had no constitutional authority to directly intervene and put an end to slavery, and opponents often said that "abolition was his personal desire and not the wish of the nation".

=== Paraíba Valley ===
Coffee was introduced to Brazil in 1717, but its production only became important at the beginning of the 19th century, mainly due to the decline of gold production, which was the focus of the colony's economy. Coffee was a factor in the country's economic and financial recovery, reintegrating the essentially agricultural Brazilian economy into the expanding sectors of the world market.

In addition to the European markets, Brazilian coffee began to penetrate the North American market, making it Brazil's main buyer in this century. By 1870, coffee accounted for 56% of exports, reaching 61% in the 1880s. The organization of coffee plantations in the Paraíba Valley and Minas Gerais was faced with a shortage of workforce. The expansion of the coffee plantations increased the need for workers to the point where slaves had to be bought from abroad, even though the British, on whom we depended economically, lobbied to eliminate the slave trade.

Faced with so many unfulfilled promises regarding the extinction of the slave trade, the British decreed the Aberdeen Act, which gave England the right to capture any slave ship and prosecute the traffickers. This decree, besides not reducing the slave trade, significantly increased its price. The solution to the lack of workforce in the coffee plantations involved promoting immigration.

The foreign income from coffee, the economy's main product, made it possible to pay for the financing of government works and later in the industrial sector. From 1850 onwards, the Empire achieved a balanced budget and exchange rate stability. Capital was accumulated and large-scale administrative works were carried out.

Shortly, the debts imposed a regime of semi-slavery on the immigrants. In 1857, the settlers of Ibicaba Farm revolted, leading the German authorities to ban immigration to Brazil. As the partnership system failed, the farmers began to pay either a fixed price per hectare worked or a fixed monthly wage: this introduced wage labor into the country.

With the establishment of the coffee economy on a capitalist basis, a new ruling class emerged: the coffee bourgeoisie. Owners linked to coffee were in charge of all sectors of the economy, something that didn't happen in the sugar mills, where the owners only took care of production, with marketing and finance being the responsibility of other sectors.

=== The situation of the coffee elite ===
Although the import of slaves from the northeast had eased in the 1860s, the coffee barons' situation was declining; the idea of adopting salaried labor was the only solution. Meanwhile, Europeans were experiencing new internal conflicts, such as the wars of unification in Italy and Germany. The problem was that, due to its slavery regime, Brazil frightened away many potential immigrants, who preferred other countries, such as the United States. Despite this, the government did not implement new measures to abolish slavery due to the country's policy. A large part of the Liberal and Conservative parties, the National Congress and other government bodies had links with the northeastern elite, which strongly defended the maintenance of slavery in the country.

The Empire tried to ease internal and external pressure by signing two laws: the Free Birth Law (1871) and the Sexagenarian Law (1885). During this period, the Empire began to finance the immigration of Europeans for agriculture in Brazil. Many Italians went to São Paulo to grow coffee; Germans, Poles and Italians also immigrated to the south to set up colonies; and at the beginning of the 20th century, already in the Republic, Japanese immigration began. Although the two laws prior to the Golden Law can be considered mediocre, it is necessary to consider the social conditions at the time. Both laws were enacted under intense criticism from parliamentarians.

=== The Golden Law ===
In 1823, slaves represented 29% of the Brazilian population, but this percentage fell to 15.2% in 1872 and to approximately 5% in 1888. The abolition of slavery was a delicate subject in Brazil, since slaves were used by everyone, from the richest to the poorest, and the abolitionist movement was gaining more relevance and adherence, even in a society accustomed to the "normality" that slavery represented. The taboo on the abolition was put to rest from the 1880s onwards, when numerous anti-slavery clubs (Sociedade Abolicionista Cearense, Libertadora Pernambucana, Abolicionista do Espírito Santo, Libertadora Rio-Grandense, Confederação Abolicionista, etc.) emerged at a rapid pace in all the provinces of the country, where pamphlets, manifestos, newspapers and books against slavery were produced by the thousands all over Brazil. In March 1888, the aristocratic and imperial Petrópolis was declared free of slavery. Led by Princess Isabel, a committee of residents had raised the funds to buy the freedom of the city's captives.

On May 3, 1888, the Imperial Princess Isabel, as regent, was received by parliamentarians at the Conde dos Arcos Palace, the seat of the Senate, to deliver the Speech from the throne. There, she called for an end to servile labor in the country.

[...] The extinction of the servile element, through the influence of national sentiment and private liberality, in honor of Brazil, has progressed peacefully in such a way that it is today an aspiration acclaimed by all classes, with admirable examples of self-denial on the part of the owners. When private interest itself spontaneously collaborates to rid Brazil of the unfortunate inheritance that the needs of agriculture had maintained, I trust that you will not hesitate to erase from Brazilian law the only exception that appears in it to be in antagonism with the Christian and liberal spirit of our institutions [...].

At the opening of the legislative session on May 8, 1888, the Minister of Agriculture, Councillor Rodrigo Augusto da Silva, presented a bill for the unconditional abolition of slaves, which was enacted within just five days. On May 13, 1888, Princess Isabel, daughter of the Emperor and heir to the throne, signed the Golden Law, which declared slavery extinct in Brazil and repealed any other law that said otherwise. Even with the act, many of the slaves continued to be unemployable because they were considered criminals. However, since 2006, unpublished correspondence from Princess Isabel, dated August 1889, has been released, revealing her intentions, in a possible third reign, to promote compensation for former slaves, a wide-ranging agrarian reform to distribute land to newly freed blacks, as well as women's suffrage. At the end of the Empire – precisely in May 1889 – the cabinet of João Alfredo de Oliveira included in the Speech from the Throne at the opening of the legislative work the need to expropriate areas on the margins of railroads under construction and navigable rivers, to establish agricultural 'colonies' that would house poor landless farmers and slaves recently freed by the Golden Law. However, the power of the landowners was so strong and influential that in June of the same year, João Alfredo's cabinet was overthrown after a demoralization campaign against him in parliament and the press; the Viscount of Ouro Preto, the last prime minister of the Empire, was chosen in his place.

Isabel was honored with the Golden Rose by Pope Leo XIII. João Maurício Wanderley, Baron of Cotegipe, the only senator in the Empire who voted against the law to abolish slavery, greeted the princess shortly after she signed the Golden Law and prophesied: "You have just redeemed a race and lost your throne!" and she replied: "I would give a thousand thrones to free the slaves of Brazil!". The Golden Law was passed as a matter of urgency just ten days after the princess regent's speech.

=== The delay in abolishing slavery ===
There are questions and confusion about the Brazilian Empire's delay in abolishing slavery in the country, which end up transmitting the erroneous image that the Brazilian monarchy was in favor of its continuation. Almost all Latin American countries decided to abolish the slave trade and slavery itself during the wars of independence (1810–1825). The main exceptions were abolition in the Dutch colonies in 1863, the United States of America in 1865 and Brazil in 1888.

Brazil was a constitutional monarchy, and as such, the Emperor did not have sufficient constitutional powers to intervene and put an end to slavery in the country once and for all. During the reign of Pedro II, he and his family fought a battle against the powerful coffee growers in favor of abolishing slavery. In 1840, when he assumed the throne, Pedro II freed all the captiver he had inherited. He needed to convince politicians about the importance of abolition to gain support and achieve his goal. Gradually, slavery was abolished in the country to avoid upsetting the national economic structure and causing revolts.

His father, Pedro I, was also against slavery (having declared on one occasion: "I know that my blood is the same color as that of the blacks") and had the power to declare the extinction of slavery back in 1823 during the constituent assembly that structured the 1824 constitution. However, José Bonifácio de Andrada had already warned that, if the slaves were suddenly freed, there could be a revolutionary rupture throughout the country that could fragment the country into countless smaller republics, since at the time, the tendency of some Brazilian provinces was separatism and the national economy was exclusively slave-based. In the 1860s, José Bonifácio's fears were confirmed in the United States when Abraham Lincoln, in his efforts to end slavery in the country, ended up being one of the main factors behind the outbreak of the American Civil War. Therefore, to avoid a fratricide similar to that in the United States, slavery was gradually eradicated.

Due to the early demand for labor in the exploitation of brazilwood, slave labor ended up becoming the system in force in Brazil since the mid-1530s. After more than 350 years, a sudden break became socially and economically unfeasible, even at independence. The slave trade was a huge business, involving hundreds of ships and thousands of people on both sides of the Atlantic. Even after the agreements of 1815 and 1826, the number of captives only increased and the reason was the growth of coffee plantations. The situation changed only after the signing of the Eusébio de Queirós, Free Birth and Sexagenarian laws, and with the encouragement of European immigration to Brazil, which created a transition from slave labor to wage labor and gradually reduced the number of slaves in society, but it still wasn't enough. The abolitionist Joaquim Nabuco calculated that. at this pace, there would still be slavery in Brazil until the middle of the 20th century. In addition to the moral and humanitarian issues surrounding the issue, the slave regime went against the capitalist and liberal principles that were progressively being established in the country and around the world.

== Platine issue ==
The Platine Wars were a series of diplomatic and military conflicts that took place in the 19th century between the countries of the Plata region. These disputes began in 1816, when Prince Regent João VI wanted to annex the Banda Oriental and fix the southern border on the left bank of the River Plate basin during the War against Artigas, also known as the First Cisplatine War.

Some conflicts also occurred during the reign of Pedro I, such as the Cisplatine War (1825–1828), but the wars that happened during the reign of Pedro II were more significant:

- Platine War, or War against Oribe and Rosas, from 1851 to 1852;
- Uruguayan War, or War against Aguirre, from 1864 to 1865;
- Paraguayan War, or War of the Triple Alliance, from 1864 to 1870.

Brazil had no serious conflicts with its neighbors to the north and west, due to the almost impenetrable and sparsely populated Amazon rainforest. However, in the south, the colonial disputes inherited from Portugal and Spain over control of the navigable rivers and plains that shape the borders continued after the independence of the countries in the Plata region (Argentina, Uruguay, Paraguay, Brazil). The lack of consolidated borders in this region led to several international conflicts.

=== Platine War ===
In the 1850s, Manuel Oribe and Juan Manuel de Rosas, the presidents of Uruguay and Argentina respectively, attempted to create a single country, which would imbalance the forces in the River Plate basin, since the new nation would control both sides of the River Plate estuary independently, opposing Brazil's interests in the region. Pedro II declared war on both countries and ordered a new army to be organized in the south, under the care of the then Count of Caxias. He invaded Uruguay in 1851, defeating Oribe and putting an end to the possibility of Uruguay merging with Argentina. The Empire's successful passage through this conflict and the pacification of the Ragamuffin Revolution and the Praieira Revolt considerably improved the nation's stability and prestige, making Brazil a hemispheric power.

=== Uruguayan War ===
In 1864, Argentina suspended relations with Uruguay's nationalist president Atanasio Cruz Aguirre, which inflamed Uruguayans. As a result, Brazilian properties in Rio Grande do Sul were invaded and looted by rioters, and Brazilians living in Uruguay were persecuted. In an attempt to find a diplomatic solution, Pedro II tried to negotiate with the Uruguayan president, but was unsuccessful. He even denied Brazil's ultimatum and threatened to break the 1852 Boundary Treaty signed between the two countries.

Renouncing diplomatic options, the Emperor sought an agreement with General Venancio Flores, who was vying for power in Uruguay and supported a Brazilian invasion. In March 1864, the Army Observation Division (later known as the Auxiliary Division) crossed the border and invaded Uruguay for 11 months. On February 15, 1865, after a few days of siege in Uruguay's capital, Montevideo, President Aguirre surrendered and was removed from office. Venancio Flores was appointed in his place and signed the peace agreement with Brazil on February 20. The invasion of Uruguay, as well as Aguirre's deposition, were some of the causes that led to the Paraguayan War, as the Paraguayan president, Solano Lopez, was an ally of Aguirre and the Blanco Party in Uruguay.

=== Paraguayan War ===
The Paraguayan War, fought between Paraguay and the Triple Alliance (Brazil, Argentina and Uruguay), was the largest international armed conflict in South America, lasting from December 1864 to March 1870. It is also called the War of the Triple Alliance in Argentina and Uruguay, and the Great War in Paraguay.

The conflict began on November 11, 1864, when the Brazilian steamboat Marquês de Olinda, carrying the president of the province of Mato Grosso, Frederico Carneiro de Campos, was taken prisoner in the port of Asunción; he never arrived in Cuiabá and died in a Paraguayan prison. Six weeks later, the Paraguayan army, under the orders of Francisco Solano López, invaded the Brazilian province of Mato Grosso. Before the Brazilian intervention in Uruguay, Solano López was already producing modern military equipment in preparation for a future conflict with Argentina. He cherished the expansionist and militaristic dream of forming Greater Paraguay, which would encompass the Argentine regions of Corrientes and Entre Rios, Uruguay, Rio Grande do Sul, Mato Grosso and Paraguay itself. Aiming for imperialist expansion, Solano López installed compulsory military service, organized an army of 80,000 men, re-equipped the navy and created war industries.

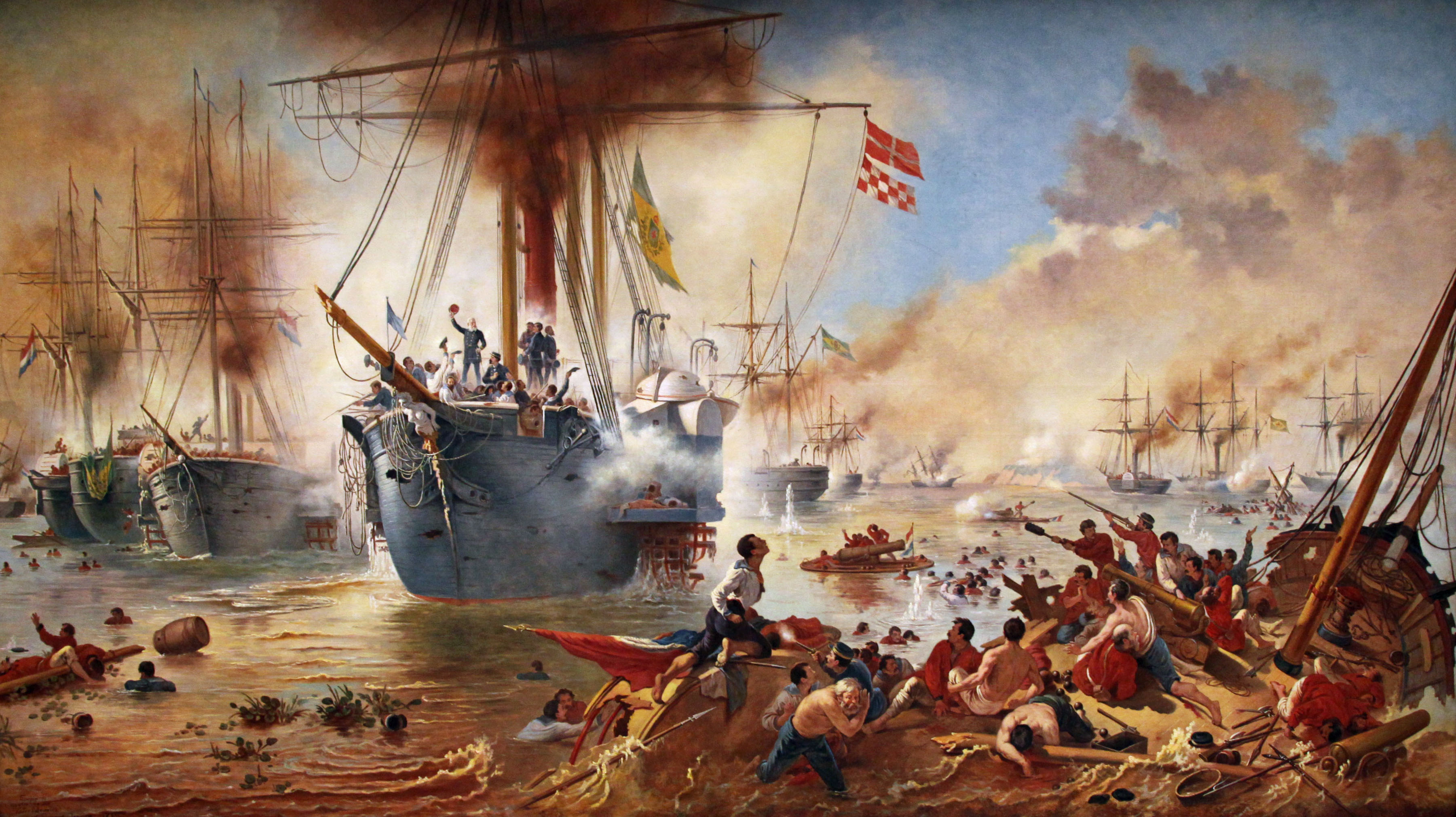
Battle of Riachuelo, by Victor Meirelles.

In May 1865, Paraguay also made several armed incursions into Argentine territory with the aim of conquering Rio Grande do Sul. Against the Paraguayan government's intentions, Brazil, Argentina and Uruguay reacted by signing a military agreement called Triple Alliance. The Empire of Brazil, Argentina and Uruguay, allies, defeated Paraguay after more than five years of fighting during which the Empire sent around 150,000 men to war. Around 50,000 did not return – some authors claim that the death rate in the case of Brazil may have reached 60,000 if civilians are included, mainly in the then provinces of Rio Grande do Sul and Mato Grosso. Argentina and Uruguay suffered proportionally heavy losses – more than 50% of their troops died during the war – although the absolute numbers were less significant. The human losses suffered by Paraguay, on the other hand, are estimated at up to 300,000 people, including civilians and soldiers, who died as a result of the fighting, the epidemics that spread during the war and the famine.

The defeat was a decisive turning point in Paraguay's history, making it one of the most neglected countries in South America, due to its decreasing population, military occupation for almost ten years, payment of war indemnities (in the case of Brazil, until the World War II) and the loss of almost 40% of the disputed territory to Brazil and Argentina. In the post-war period, Paraguay remained under Brazilian hegemony. This was the last of four international armed conflicts during the so-called Platine Question, in which the Empire of Brazil fought.

Against all expectations, the war ended only in 1870. Thousands of Brazilian soldiers died and the costs of the war were eleven times higher than the government's annual budget. However, the country was so prosperous that the government was able to pay off the war debt in just ten years. The conflict was also a stimulus for national production and economic growth, as well as reviving the abolitionist campaign.

== Apogee, crisis and Proclamation of the Republic ==
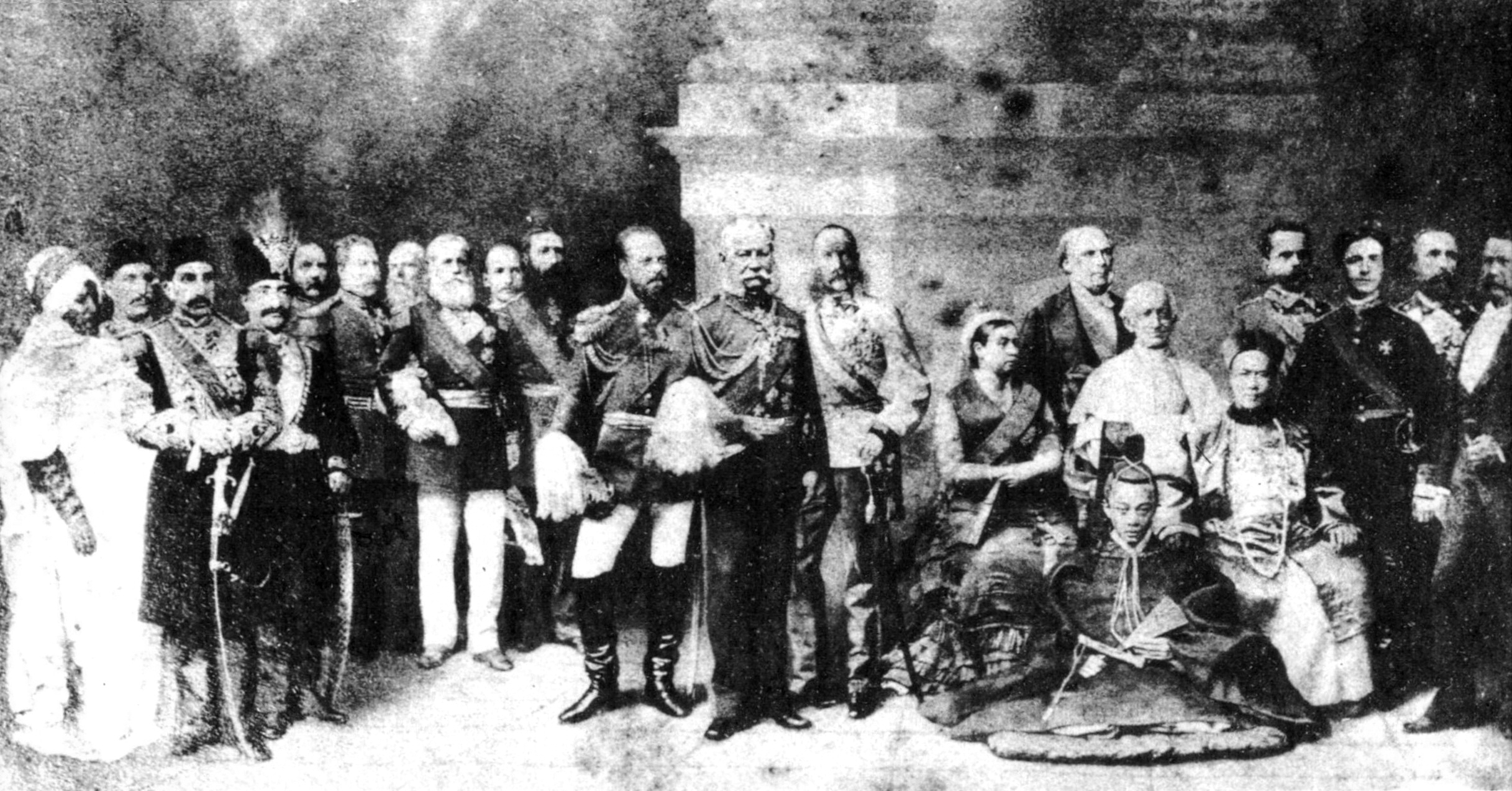
"The World's Sovereigns". A photomontage made in Europe in 1889 with the main heads of state in the world. D. Pedro II, then Emperor of Brazil, is 8th from left to right.

A number of factors contributed to the fall of the Brazilian monarchy and its replacement by the republican system. Throughout the 1870s and 1880s, Brazil maintained its prosperity in all social spheres: slavery was already doomed to extinction; the country's economy, based on liberalism, evolved through a transition that enabled the growth of industrialization and the replacement of the old slave system with salaried labor, – gradually making capitalism the country's hegemonic economic system – making Brazil an emerging power with no equivalent in the Americas, with the exception of the United States. After the Paraguayan War, Brazil experienced its Belle Époque, which took place mainly in the two most prosperous parts of the country at the time: the rubber region (Amazonas, Rondônia and Pará) and the coffee region (São Paulo and Minas Gerais), with coffee becoming one of the main pillars of the Brazilian economy, now known as the "green gold". By 1889, the Brazilian monarch had achieved prominence on the world stage both for Brazil and for himself. Ironically, the fall of the Brazilian monarchy occurred at a time of its greatest popularity.

From the 1880s onwards, Pedro II was often seen as despondent or unenthusiastic, although he continued to be meticulous about matters of state and his role as "vigilant" of public institutions until the end of his reign. The trips he made to the US, Europe and the Middle East between 1876 and 1877 had a profound psychological impact on him, because while he was traveling, he was practically free from the restrictions imposed by his position. Under the pseudonym "Pedro de Alcântara", he enjoyed the satisfaction of moving around like an ordinary person, including traveling by train with just his wife. Regarding the possibility of a third reign after his death, the Emperor, like many Brazilians and the political class at the time, did not accept the idea that Brazil could be ruled by a woman, his daughter Isabel. The death of his two sons at a young age and the lack of a male heir were a sign that the Empire was destined to be abolished.

In 1884, Ceará and Amazonas freed their slaves, as slavery was no longer economically viable in those provinces. The idea was to abolish slavery province by province, leaving the "slavery triangle" isolated to the provinces of Minas Gerais, São Paulo and Rio de Janeiro. However, Ceará's decision increased public pressure on the imperial authorities.

On September 28, 1885, under pressure, the Sexagenarian Law was enacted, which regulated the "gradual extinction of the servile element" and guaranteed freedom to slaves aged 60 or over, with slave owners having to pay compensation. In 1887, Pedro II traveled to France to treat an illness, leaving Isabel as the country's regent. On May 13, 1888, Princess Isabel signed the Golden Law, abolishing slavery once and for all and freeing the last 720,000 slaves in the country (5% of the population). The Emperor heard the news on May 22, and with a weak voice and tears in his eyes, he murmured: "We praise God. Great people! Great people!" and burst into copious tears. On his return to Brazil in August 1888, he and his wife were fervently acclaimed. The writer Machado de Assis reported that there were three days of public celebrations and that "the whole country received him with an enthusiasm never seen before. From the capital, from the provinces, from everywhere, came proofs of affection and veneration". The monarchy seemed to enjoy unwavering support at the peak of its popularity.

However, the end of slavery triggered an explicit switch of support to republicanism by the big coffee farmers, which was the final stroke to any remaining belief in the neutrality of the crown, since they felt aggrieved at losing their property and not being compensated. The imperial government planned to exploit the easy credit available in Brazil as a result of its prosperity and made large low-interest loans accessible to coffee growers, as well as handing out titles of nobility and other honors to influential political figures who had become discontented. "I see the Monarchy in serious danger and almost doomed. The princess has become very popular, but the (conservative) classes are running away from her and the countryside is republican," wrote Joaquim Nabuco to the Baron of Penedo, 12 days after the signing of the Golden Law.

These measures frightened civilian republicans and military positivists. Although republicanism was an elitist ideology adopted only by high-ranking military officers - and the general population felt a certain aversion to it, as they preferred the monarchy – its combination with positivist ideals became a threat to the country. Despite the fact that the majority of Brazilians had no desire to change the country's system of government, the Republicans began to put pressure on army officers to overthrow the monarchy.

=== Abolitionist issue ===
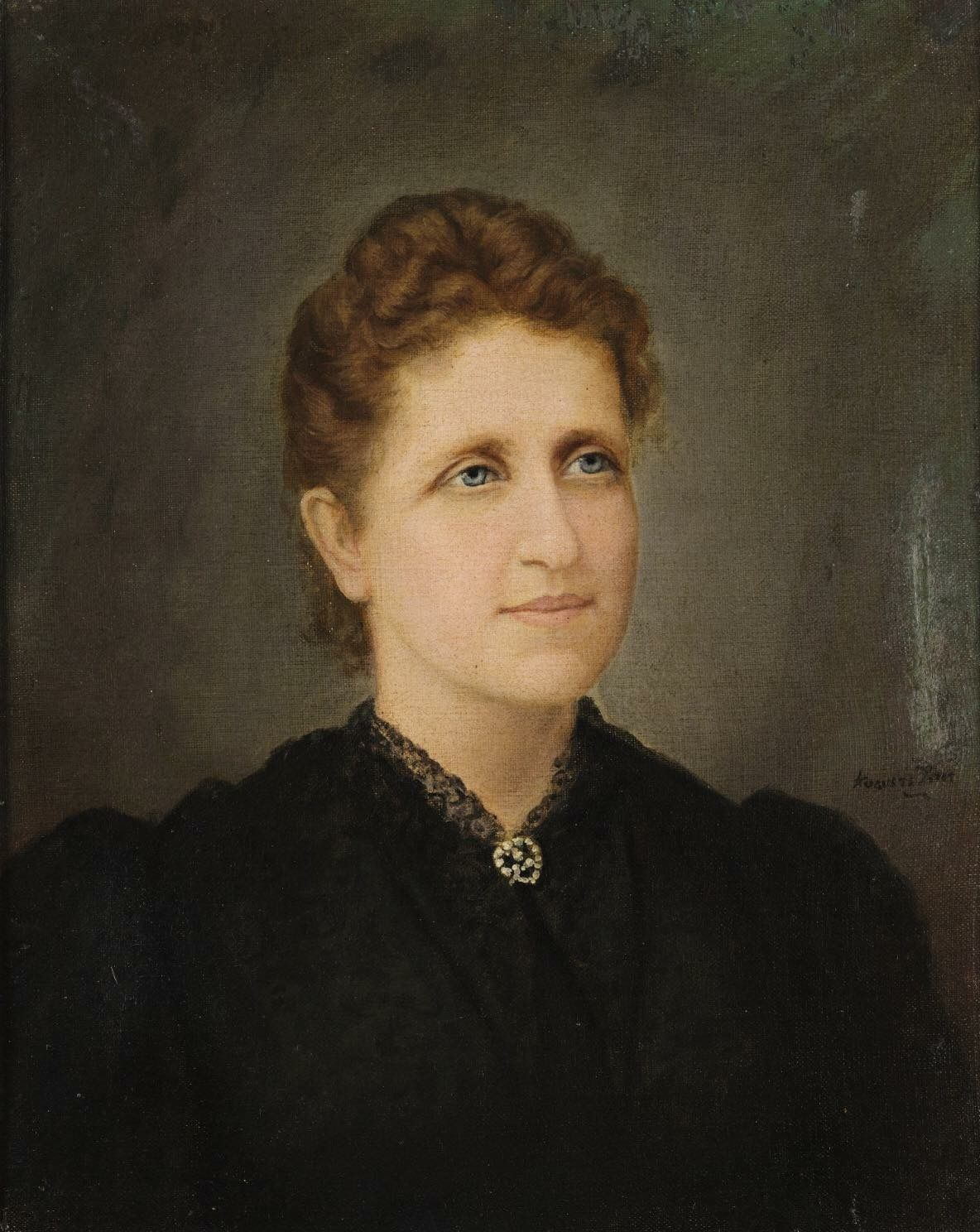
The regent, Princess Isabel, painting by Auguste Petit, 1869.

The big coffee growers and landowners were not satisfied with the abolition of slavery and the lack of compensation. Feeling neglected by the monarchy, they began to support the republican cause, giving rise to the so-called republicans of May 13 (the date of the signing of the Golden Law). The main acts that contributed to the end of slavery in Brazil were:

- Paraguayan War: many slaves were encouraged to fight as Homeland Volunteers in exchange for their freedom, if they survived the war;
- Eusébio de Queirós Law (1850): extinguished the slave trade;
- Free Birth Law (1871): the children of slaves were considered free and their masters had to raise them until they were eight years old;
- Sexagenarian Law (1885): once a slave reached the age of 60, he was freed;
- Golden Law (1888): total abolition of slavery;

=== Religious issue ===
Since the colonial period, the Catholic Church had been an institution subject to the state, through the patronage regime, which gave the Emperor control over the clergy and ecclesiastical affairs. In other words, no order from the pope could take effect in Brazil without first being approved by the Emperor.

However, in 1872, Bishop Vital and Bishop Macedo, of Olinda and Belém, respectively, decided to follow orders from Pope Pius IX, punishing religious who supported Freemasonry and frequented the institution by forbidding marriage between Catholics and Freemasons. D. Pedro II, demanded that the bishops suspend the punishments. As they refused to obey the Emperor, they were sentenced to four years in prison. In 1875, they received an imperial pardon and were released, but the episode damaged relations between the Church and the Emperor.

=== Military issue ===
During the Empire, the Montepio Project had been approved, which would pay a pension to the families of soldiers killed or mutilated in the Paraguayan War. The war ended in 1870 and in 1883 the pension had still not been paid. The military then commissioned Lieutenant-Colonel Sena Madureira to defend their rights, but he was punished after speaking out against the Montepio Project. From then on, the military were forbidden to make statements to the press without prior imperial authorization.

The disrespect that some conservative politicians and ministers had for the Army led them to punish high-ranking officers for reasons that were classified as military indiscipline. The punishments given to Lieutenant-Colonel Sena Madureira and Colonel Ernesto Augusto da Cunha Matos caused revolt among important army leaders, such as Marshal Deodoro da Fonseca. In addition, after the Paraguayan War, the army began to feel despised by the government, perceiving a preference for the imperial navy. The army's dissatisfaction caused riots in the quarters in the 1880s, which was one of the reasons that led to the proclamation of the republic in 1889.

=== Republican coup of November 15, 1889 ===
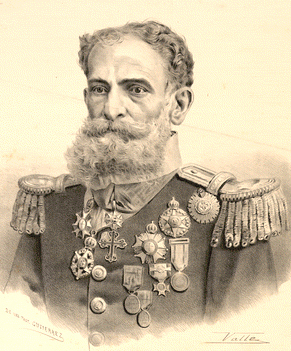
Marshal Deodoro da Fonseca.

Since the creation of the Republican Party of São Paulo in 1873, the pro-republic movement has attracted very few supporters, and for the change in the system of government to succeed in a democratic way, it would be necessary to have a majority republican General Assembly, which seemed a distant prospect, as the population had no affinity with the overthrow of the monarchy and sympathized with the Emperor. The idea of a new political regime did not resonate in the country. In 1884, only three Republicans were elected to the Chamber of Deputies, including the future presidents of the Republic, Prudente de Morais and Campos Sales. In the following parliamentary term, only one was elected. In the last parliamentary election held in the Empire of Brazil, on August 31, 1889, the Republican Party only elected two deputies. Aware of this problem, the Republicans opted to implement their ideas through a military coup.

The government of the last prime minister of the Empire, Afonso Celso de Assis Figueiredo, Viscount of Ouro Preto, presented a bold program of political reforms to the Chamber of Deputies: freedom of religious faith, freedom of education and its improvement, the expansion of voting privileges by abolishing the census vote, the end of life terms for the senate and, most important of all, increasing decentralization – which in turn would transform the country into a federation by allowing the election of municipal mayors and provincial presidents. The Viscount of Ouro Preto was a strong monarchist and was determined to save the regime despite the costs. His reform program was highly ambitious and intended to resolve old issues that politicians had long complained about. However, two essential items were missed: the need for action to resolve military indiscipline and the urgent demand to restore the government's authority over the armed forces.

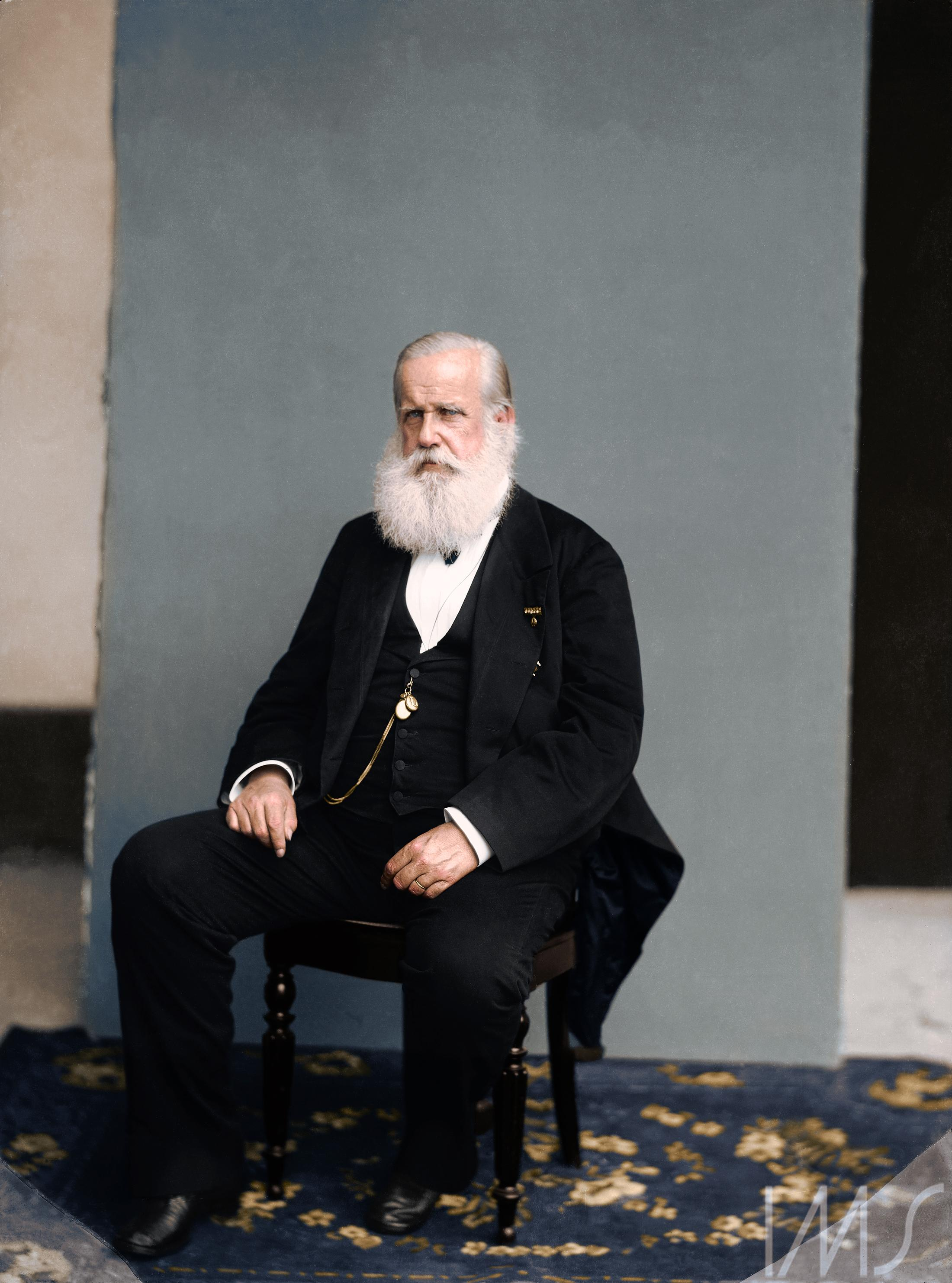
In the photo, Emperor Pedro II in 1889, at the age of 64.

However, the changes occurred too late. On the morning of November 15, 1889, Marshal Deodoro da Fonseca assumed command of the revolted troops, occupying the headquarters in Rio de Janeiro and initially dismissing the Viscount of Ouro Preto. On the night of November 15, the Provisional Government of the Republic of the United States of Brazil was formed. Pedro II, who was in Petrópolis during these events, received a document from the new government the following day, requesting that he and his family leave the country. The former Emperor was forced to embark for Europe with his family on November 17, 1889, at dawn and in the rain, to avoid a popular uprising. Once the republic was proclaimed, on November 15, 1889, a provisional government was formed with Marshal Deodoro da Fonseca, Brazil's first president, as head of government, putting an end to the Second Reign and the Brazilian Imperial period. The Republic of the United States of Brazil was declared.

There was no popular participation in the proclamation of the Republic of Brazil. What happened was technically a military coup; the Brazilian people supported the Emperor. The correspondent of the São Paulo newspaper Diário Popular, Aristides Lobo, wrote in the November 18 edition of that newspaper, about the overthrow of the Empire, the historic phrase:

[...] For the moment, the government's tone is purely military and will remain so. The event was theirs, theirs alone, because the civilian element's collaboration was almost nil. The people watched it all in amazement, astonished, surprised, without knowing what it meant. Many seriously believed they were watching a parade! [...].

In the opinion of the Viscount of Ouro Preto, who was deposed from the presidency of the Council of Ministers on November 15, the proclamation of the republic was a mistake, as he expressed in his book Advento da ditadura militar no Brasil:

The Empire was not ruin. It was conservation and progress. During half a century, it kept a colossal territory intact, peaceful and united. The Empire turned a backward and sparsely populated country into a great and strong nationality, the first South American power, considered and respected throughout the civilized world. The Empire effectively abolished the death penalty, extinguished slavery, gave Brazil immortal glories, internal peace, order, security and, above all, individual freedom such as there had never been in any other country. What were the mistakes or crimes of Pedro II, who in almost fifty years of reign never persecuted anyone, never remembered an ingratitude, never avenged an injury, always ready to forgive, forget and benefit? What mistakes did he make that made him worthy of deposition and exile when, old and infirm, he should have had the respect and veneration of his fellow citizens? The Brazilian Republic, as it was proclaimed, is a work of iniquity. The Republic was raised on the broaches of mutinous soldiers, it comes from a criminal origin, it was achieved through an unprecedented attack in history and it will have an ephemeral existence!

Overall, the Second Reign can be divided into three main stages:

- Consolidation phase (1840 to 1850): internal struggles were pacified, coffee began to expand and the Alves Branco tariff facilitated the Mauá era;
- Apogee of the Empire (1849–1889): a period of 50 years marked by great political stability, internal peace allowed by the parliamentary system (reverse parliamentarism) and the policy of exchanging favors, and no revolution. Internationally, the period was marked by the Christie Question and the Paraguayan War;
- Decline of the Empire: characterized by military and religious issues, abolitionist struggles and the republican movement, which led to the end of the monarchical regime.

== See also ==
- Economic history of Brazil
- Encilhamento
- Legacy of Pedro II of Brazil
- First reign
