= Thomas Davatz =

Swiss teacher (1815–1888)

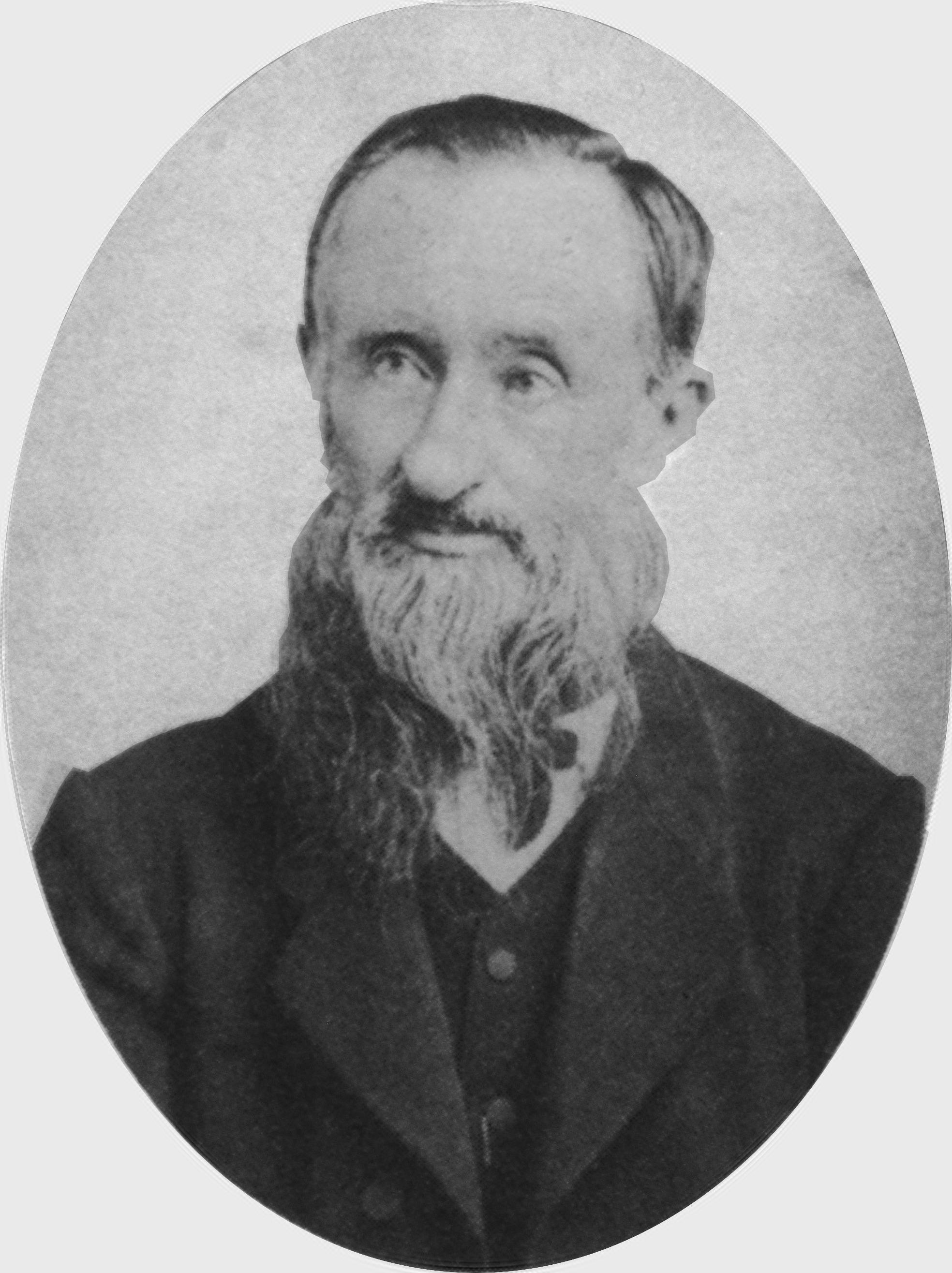
- Davatz in c. 1880
- Born: 23 April 1815; Fanas, Grisons, Switzerland
- Died: 6 February 1888 (aged 72); Landquart, Grisons, Switzerland
- Citizenship: Swiss
- Occupations: School-master; leader of colonists in Ibicaba, São Paulo, Brazil; 1858-1884 postmaster in Landquart
- Spouse: Katharina Auer (m. 1840)

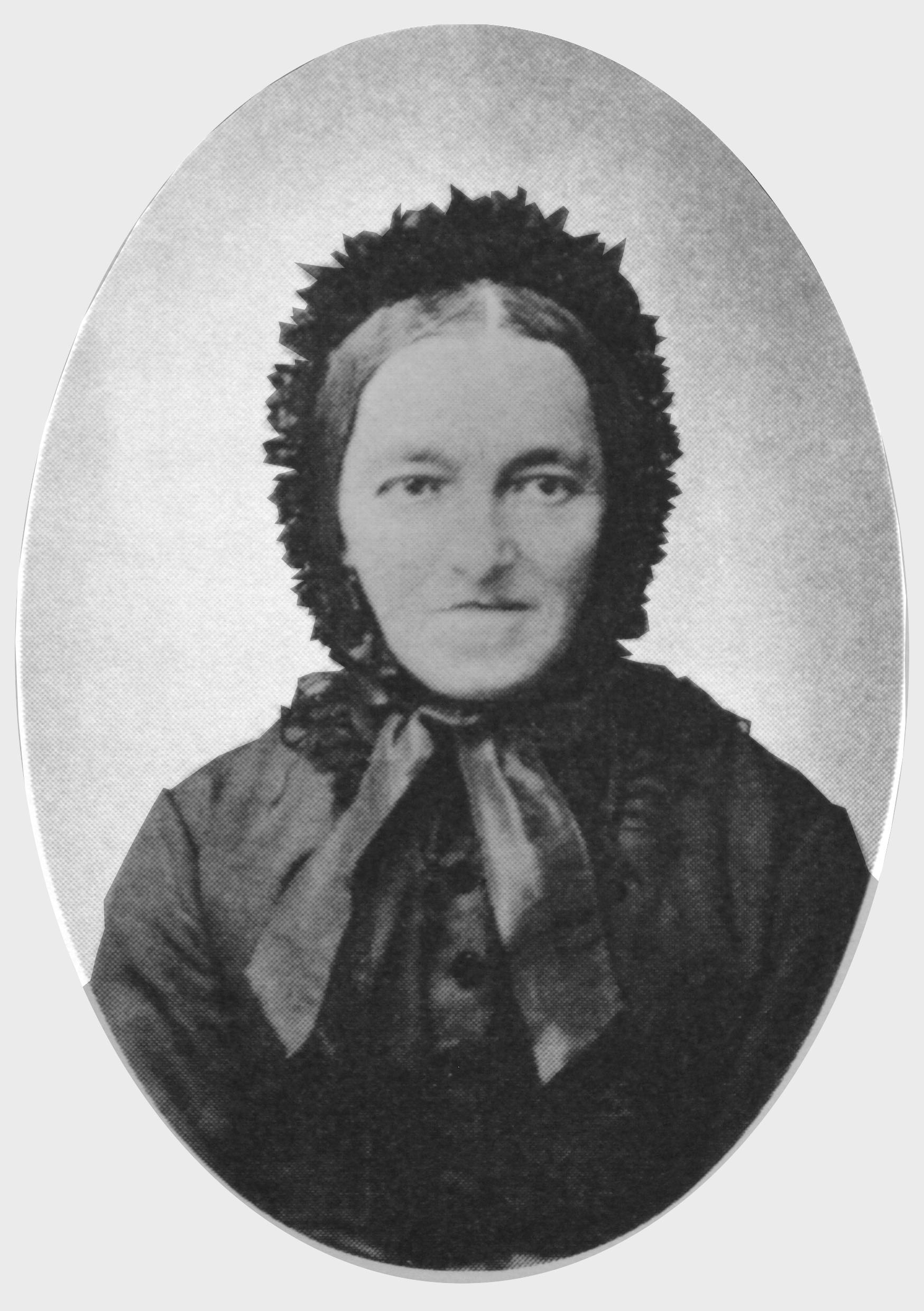
Katharina Davatz-Auer, about 1880

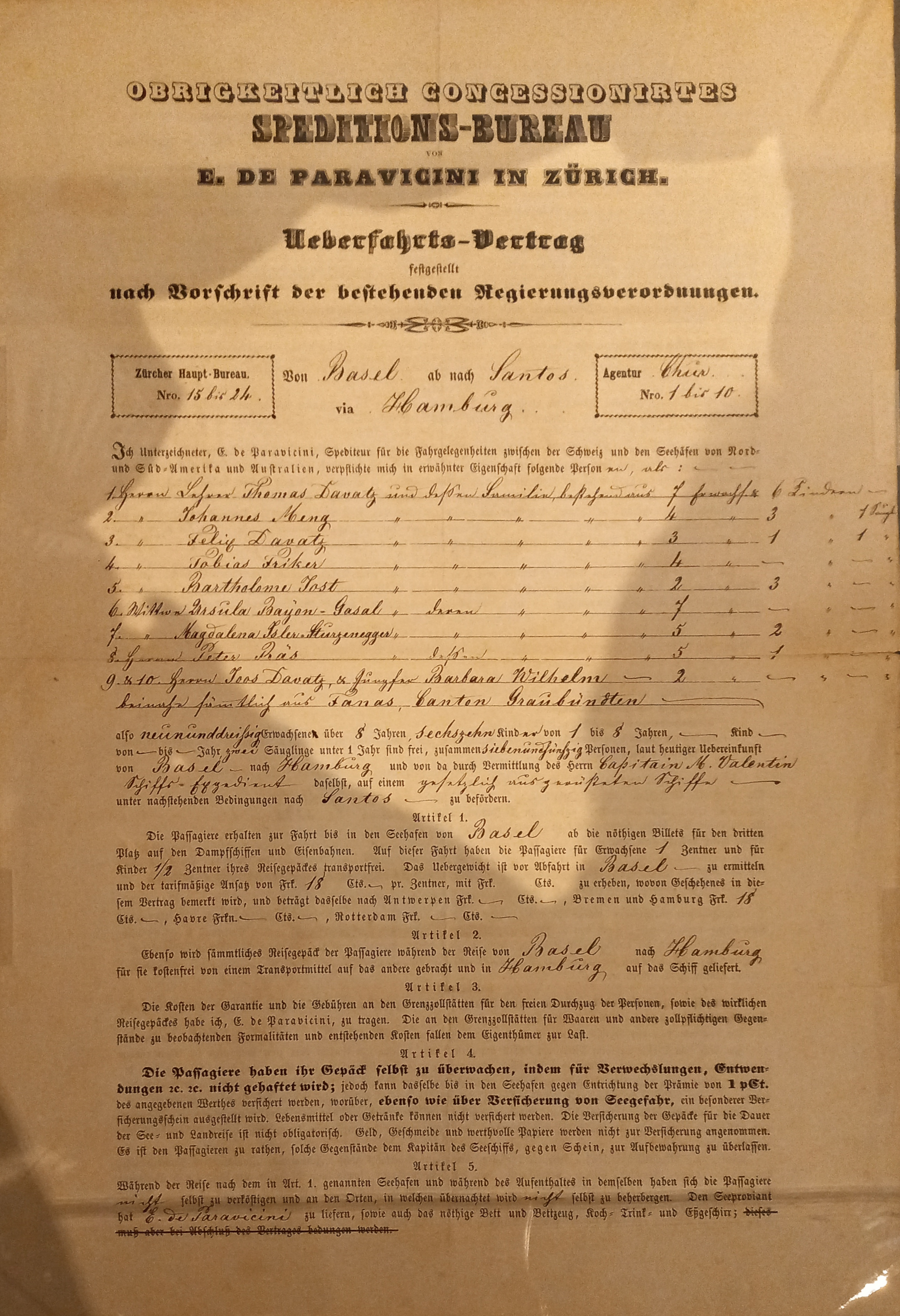
Passage contract of the Thomas Davatz family for their emigration to Brazil

Thomas Davatz (23 April 1815 – 6 February 1888) was a Swiss immigrant to Brazil and the author of important reports on German immigrants in Brazil.

== Biography ==
Thomas Davatz was the oldest son of Christian and Margreth Davatz, of the Janett family in Fideris in Grisons, Switzerland. The family was Protestant, and they farmed a half-acre property. He was raised with his sister Luzia in the nearby town of Fanas, where he attended the village school. At an early age he already suffered from respiratory problems — probably bronchitis. After graduating at the top of his class, Davatz became a teacher at the primary school in Fideris in 1834–1836, at first substituting for his sick cousin. On the recommendation of the pastor in Fideris, Davatz in 1835 went to seminary at the Castle of Bueggen, close to Säckingen in Germany. He graduated as a professor within three years. During his studies there, Davatz developed a formative relationship with the director Christian Heinrich Zeller and his family. Later, Davatz would go on to be a professor in Fideris and Malans.

In 1840 he married Katharina Auer, of Fideris. In the summer of 1842, he underwent a course of treatment for his chest illness at the spa in Fideris; he had to give up teaching during the autumn. The couple moved with their first child to Fanas, to live with their grandparents. During this period a second child was born. For two winters Davatz directed the secondary school in Fanas. For a period he was he was the vice-president of the school council in Fanas. He was also a member of the district tribunal, as well as Secretary of the municipal council, and a member of board of social assistance.

In 1854, he decided to emigrate to America. His original idea had been to move to the United States. However, due to official promotions by the Brazilian government — which promised advances on travel costs and other benefits without interest for two years — he decided to go to Brazil. Many communities pre-financed the trip for families that were inclined to make the journeys, often on the condition that all the belongings of the families were to be liquidated. Davatz arrived in Brazil in July 1855, leading a group of his compatriots who had been contracted by the colonial enterprise of Nicolau Pereira de Campos Vergueiro. The colonists were taken to Ibicaba Farm, in the state of São Paulo to farm coffee. (A few of the colonists were taken to other farms.) The fact that the promised benefits upon arrival had been canceled in 1855 had been hidden by the agents of the Vergueiro network in Europe.

After various attempts to fight for the rights of the colonists, Davatz was forced to abandon his plans to stay in Brazil. He returned to Switzerland with his family in 1857. In Landquart, he assumed an administrative post in a train station and its associated postal system. After the separation the train and mail systems, he worked in Landquart from 1863 to 1884 as postmaster and telegraph operator. In 1884 his three youngest sons — Jakob (born in 1852), Johann Peter (1857), and Thomas (1863) — emigrated to North America. After a long illness, Thomas Davatz died in Landquart at 72.

== The Parceria System ==
Davatz arrived in July 1855 with his compatriots, contracted into the colonization company founded by senator Vergueiro. They were established on the senator's Fazenda Ibicaba as coffee farmers.

Initially Davatz was well received, and he was advised to learn Portuguese as quickly as possible, so that he might assume a role as administrator of the colony. He also gave classes and administered Protestant ceremonies. The conditions in which the colonists found themselves were quite different from those that had been advertised to them in Europe. Before the trip, Davatz had been obliged by Swiss authorities to write a report on the colony, and after having lived there for about a year, despite censorship imposed on his correspondence, Davatz managed to smuggle out his report. He reported that the colonists had been deceived by the rosy promises of the Brazilian government, and that they were in fact being subjected to treatment that was near slavery. The report provoked a scandal in Europe and friction with the plantation owners, who demanded an explanation. The colonists, fearing that their leader and protector would be punished or imprisoned, joined to defend him on the 24th of December, 1856. This confrontation would become known as the Ibicaba Revolt. The case rose to the attention authorities in the Brazilian empire, provoking concern that it could shake the government's colonization schemes. Two Swiss officials visited the colony to investigate: Theodor Heusser and Jean-Jacques Tschudi, who produced reports generally verifying what Davatz had said. He stayed on the farm until the beginning of March 1857, when he returned alone to Rio de Janeiro, whence he returned to Europe the same year.

In 1858 Davatz published a book, Die Behandlung der Kolonisten in der Provinz St. Paulo in Brasilien und deren Erhebung gegen ihre Bedrücker. Ein Noth-und Hilfruf an die Behörden und Menschenfreunde der Länder und Staaten, welchen die Kolonisten angerhörten (The Treatment of colonists in the province of São Paulo in Brazil and the uprising against their oppressors. An appeal and alert to friends and authorities of the states that the colonists came from), in which he narrated his experience with the clear intention of combatting the trend of emigration that was emerging in his country. The author confessed that he profoundly regretted having emigrated. He felt responsible for the cruel fate that his friends had suffered, as he had been a primary instigator of their journey. On the basis of these reports, a concerted anti-emigration campaign took shape in Europe.., with the government of Prussia banning emigration of its subjects to Brazil in 1859.

His work has considerable literary value, and is considered one of the most important documents about German colonization of the time. The Brazilian modernist Yan de Almeida Prado owned the only known copy of the book in Brazil, and the writer Mário de Andrade came into contact with the text through him. Andrade wrote two articles in the 1930s about the book, analyzing it through the lens of political bias and comparing it with the situation in Brazil in his own time, describing it as "one of the most interesting sources about the senator Vergueiro's attempt at bring German and Swiss colonists to Brazil. According to Ilka Cohen,

"By republishing the accusations of the author, Mário de Andrade reinvigorated an entire negative view of the system of colonization which had been instituted by the fazendeiros (agricultural landowners) of São Paulo in the previous century, and thus contradicted the official stance of the segment of the elite to which he was politically opposed. […] Davatz' book was no mere picturesque description of Brazil that foreigner would expect, instead, it broached delicate topics such as oppression, the abuses of the powerful, and the reactions of the oppressed — topics which were certainly uncomfortable and little known by international readers. The text’s importance was highlighted once again when, in a survey carried out by the magazine Rumo in 1933, Mário de Andrade reaffirmed his admiration for the work, listing it among the twenty titles one should read to understand Brazil.".

In 1951 a translation was published and included in the collection Biblioteca Histórica Brasileira (Brazilian Historical Library) under the title Memórias de un colono no Brasil (Memories of a Colonial in Brazil). The coordinator of the collection, Rubens Borba de Moraes, commissioned the translation from the eminent historian Sérgio Buarque de Holanda, and to contextualize the work, he asked Holanda to write an historical preface, which would go on to mark a milestone in the history of colonization in São Paulo, as it served as the basis for a series of other works, and defined a new field: the study of the colonial parceria (sharecropping) system between the large landholders and free and salaried laborers, which had been instituted to progressively replace slavery. The system was idealistic and promising, it aimed to create centers of production that would function as rural training grounds for settlers and provide them with the initial means for future economic independence. However, it failed in practice, and after the Ibicaba Revolt it rapidly declined. In the words of Holanda the system...

"[...] became more worthy of criticism for the abuses that it engendered than for the principles on which it was based. [...] However pessimistically we view the parceria system as Vergueiro had conceived it, one fact remains certain: it was principlally through the system that labor in São Paulo was able to incorporate free labor without going through the crises that the same transition would cause in other regions of Brazil.

"In the work of Thomas Davatz, today published in a Brazilian translation, the future historian would have an indispensable source for the study of agricultural labor in São Paulo during the Imperial epoch. It is of no use to insist that it was composed as with a polemical purpose. It was a partisan work, but one which as also written in good faith, and it is an expression and prolongation of the life of a poor colonist who was lost in a world which was hostile to his aspirations. It is in light of these aspects that the memories of Davatz can be appreciated for their true value".

The issue of the immigration of Swiss colonists with Thomas Davatz also entered into the literary art with the historical novel of Eveline Hasler, Ibicaba. Das Paradies in den Köpfen (Ibicaba: Paradise in Mind).

== See also ==
- German immigration to Brazil
