= Ibicaba Revolt =

Brazilian uprising in the 19th century

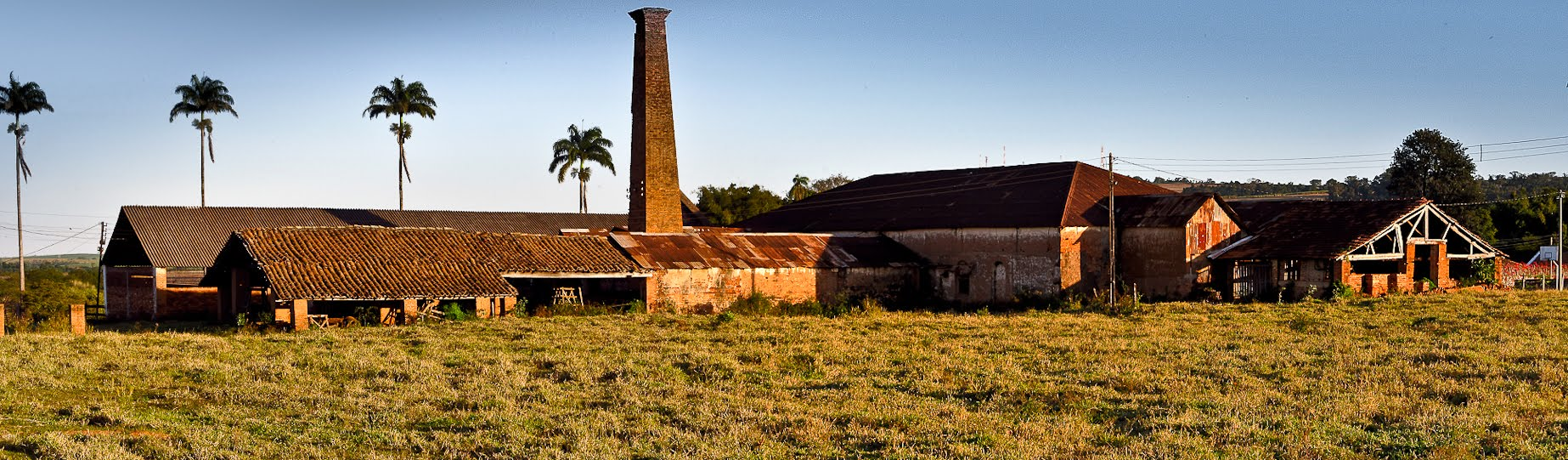
Ibicaba Farm.

The Ibicaba Revolt (Portuguese: Revolta de Ibicaba), also known as the Partners' Revolt (Revolta dos Parceiros) or the Immigrants' Revolt (Revolta dos Imigrantes), was a protest led by foreign workers on the Ibicaba Farm, located in the city of Limeira, in São Paulo. It occurred on December 24, 1856, and opposed the exploitation of labor by Brazilian masters, who had opted for the partnership system to replace slavery. Founded in 1817 by Senator Nicolau Pereira de Campos Vergueiro, Ibicaba Farm served as the headquarters of the first and one of the most important colonies in Brazil. It was the pioneer in replacing slave labor with that of European immigrants, mainly Swiss and Germans.

== Historical context ==
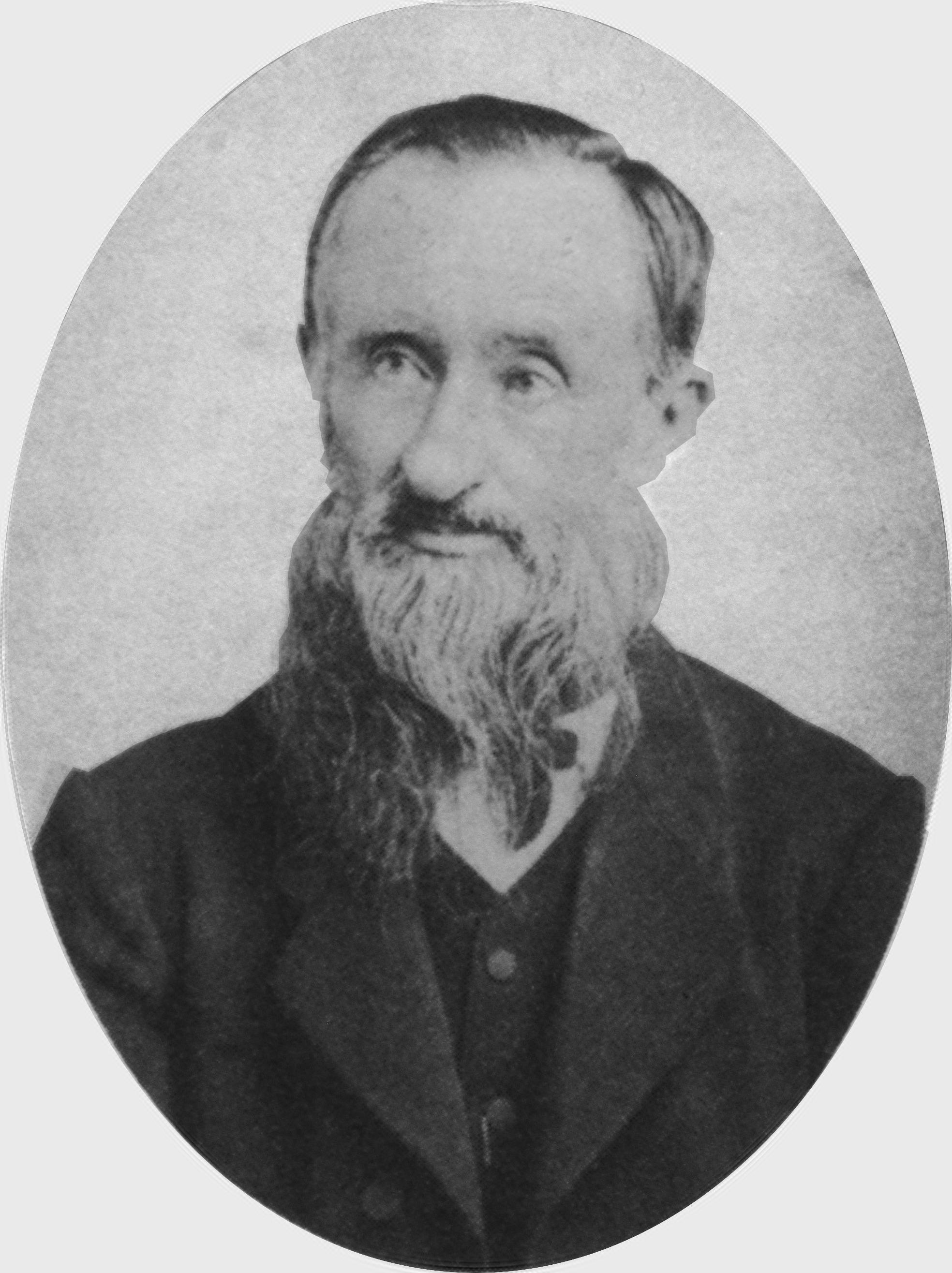
Thomas Davatz in 1880.

In the 19th century, slave labor faced restrictions after the approval of the Aberdeen Act, an English law that prohibited the maritime transport of trafficked slaves. In Brazil, the labor force, which had depended exclusively on the slave trade from Africa, required a new alternative; free workers, preferably from Europe, became an option.

Between 1847 and 1857, Senator Nicolau Vergueiro brought around 180 families from different European regions to work as farmers on Brazilian plantations. The contract was prepared by Vergueiro, who established ownership of the production and exploratory measures. Brazilian coffee growers, familiar with the exploitation of slave labor, replicated their authoritarianism with foreign workers. The landowner tried to exploit his employees to the maximum, which left the immigrant, who was free and employed, in a situation similar to slave labor.

According to the contract, the immigrant's family was responsible for paying the costs of their trip to Brazil, which included interest of 6% per year. In addition, the recruited immigrants worked on land with low productivity, which forced them to buy basic foodstuffs that were sold by the farmer who hired them. The situation was unknown to the rest of the world, mainly due to the censorship imposed on the settlers by the landowners.

== The revolt ==
In 1855 Thomas Davatz arrived in Brazil. Later, at the request of the settlers, he assumed the role of Lutheran minister for local celebrations. In Fanas, his hometown in Switzerland, Davatz received specific instructions to send reports on living and working conditions in Brazil. At the end of 1856, he requested an inquiry from the Swiss consulate in Rio de Janeiro to evaluate the values and measures used in Ibicaba and assistance to the settlers' causes.

On December 24, Davatz was called by Nicolau Vergueiro to a meeting at the Ibicaba Farm headquarters to discuss the Swiss and Thuringian workers' complaints about the partnership system. His son Luiz, the director Jonas, Professor Alscher and the family doctor, Dr. Gattiker, were also present. Threatened, Davatz asked for help from the settlers who, armed with cudgels, rakes, scythes, pistols, rifles and sticks, surrounded the farmhouse. Two shots were fired and a detachment of the São Paulo National Guard was called to the site. After a period of tension, order was restored a few days later through the intermediary of the Swiss representatives.

The revolt had international repercussions. Davatz returned to Switzerland, where he wrote about his experience in Ibicaba, which was published in Brazil under the title Memórias de um colono no Brasil. Two years later, a decree banning emigration from Prussia to the Province of São Paulo was approved. Later, with the establishment of the German Empire in 1871, a similar interdiction was imposed by the new administration. In 1933, Mário de Andrade selected the story as one of the twenty fundamental works on Brazil, as it was "the first book specifically about class struggle and proletarian demands in Brazil".

== See also ==
- Canudos War
- Empire of Brazil
