= Saraiva-Cotegipe Law =

Brazilian law from September 28, 1885, guaranteeing freedom to slaves aged 60 or older

- Long title: Law No. 3,270 of 28 September 1885
- Territorial extent: Empire of Brazil
- Enacted: 28 September 1885
- Signed by: Pedro II of Brazil

Summary
- Regulates the gradual extinction of the servile element

The Saraiva-Cotegipe Law (Portuguese: Lei Saraiva-Cotegipe), also known as the Sexagenarian Law (Lei dos Sexagenários), officially Law No. 3,270 of 28 September 1885, was a Brazilian law enacted on 28 September 1885 that granted freedom to slaves aged 60 or older. Before the release, there would be mandatory and free service, which would be provided as compensation, paid to the slaves' masters; unless the slave reached 65 years of age.

== Overview ==
Even though it had virtually no practical effect, since it freed only slaves who, because of their age, were less valued, there was great resistance from slaveowners and their representatives in the National Assembly. On the other hand, the masters falsely registered their slaves as being younger than they in fact were and, when freed, many had nowhere to go and/or had their relatives kept in the same situation of slavery.

The pressure on Parliament intensified after the so-called Dantas Project, a proposal by the liberal minister and senator Sousa Dantas, in 1884. The slaveowners reacted badly and the law was only approved in 1885, with a series of amendments, and after raising the age limit for slaves from 60 to 65. Most of the sexagenarians were located in the coffee-producing provinces, which explains the resistance in the lower House and Senate. In 1888, however, the Lei Áurea legally ended slavery.

== Context ==
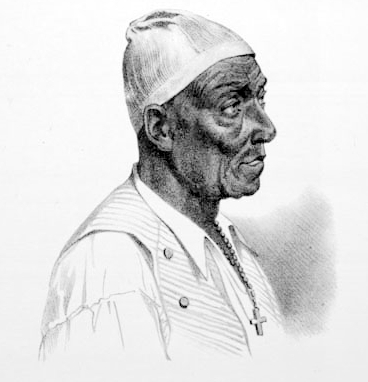
An elderly slave, by Johann Moritz Rugendas.

In 1761, the Portuguese Empire abolished slavery but maintained the practice of sending slaves to its colonies in slave ships until 1869. In colonial Brazil, revolutionary movements fought to free slaves and make them rebel against their masters. Brazil's Independence occurred in 1822, and during the reign of Pedro II, the country maintained a cautious stance on the issue, seeking to end slavery gradually, as there was a fear that a sudden end to the practice could create a socio-economic crisis.

The abolitionist cause attracted greater popular clamor in the 1870s. The adoption of the Sexagenarian Law was preceded by the enactment of the Eusébio de Queirós Law (1850) and the Free Womb Law (1871). The former prohibited the entry of African slaves into Brazil, effectively criminalizing the slave trade, while the latter granted freedom to the children born to enslaved women. Both were preceded by the Feijó Law, which decreed that blacks arriving in Brazil would be free, but was not enforced and was therefore nicknamed the "law for the English to see".

At the time the Sexagenarian Law was enacted, the Brazilian government was suffering internal and external pressures to curb slavery. In the other newly independent Latin American countries, slave labor was gradually being replaced by free labor.

== Bill ==
=== Proceedings ===
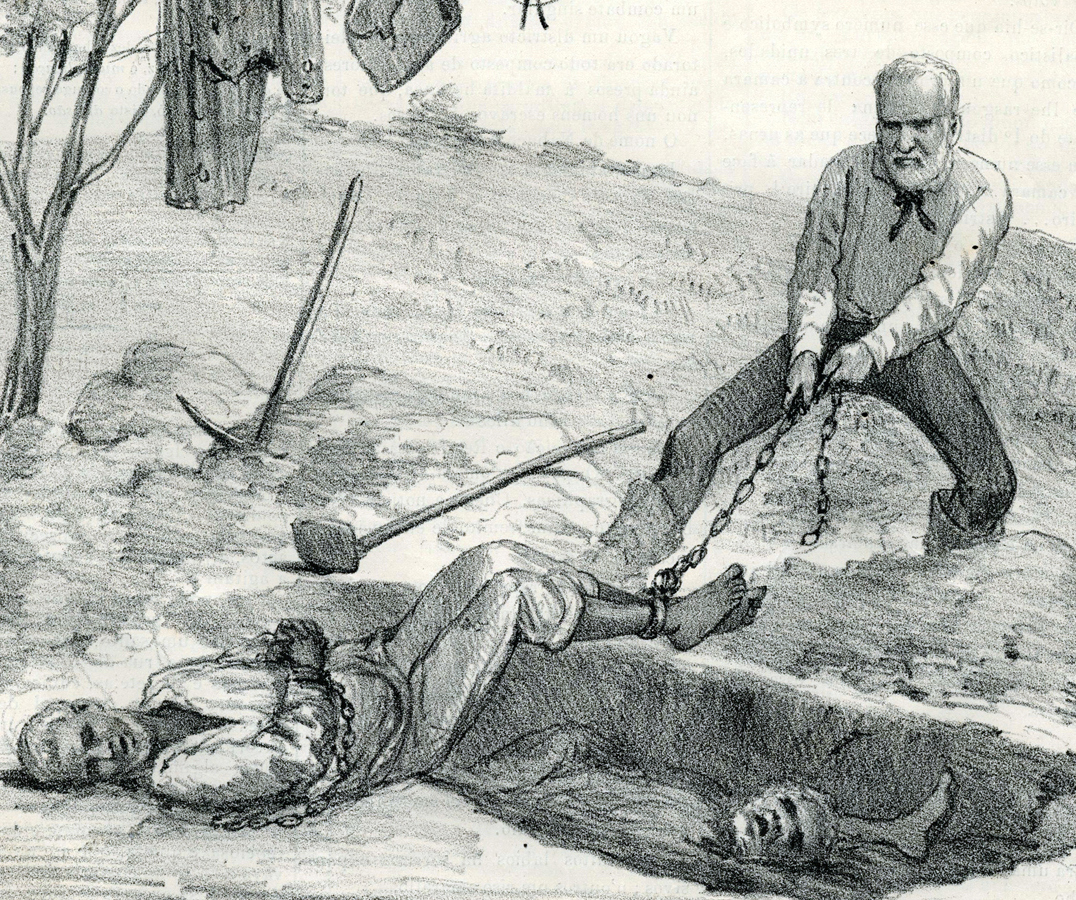
Illustration about the Sexagenarian Law, published in issue 413 of Revista Illustrada.

In 1884, the president of the Council of Ministers, the liberal Sousa Dantas, presented to the parliament a bill that gave prestige to abolitionist ideas. Initially, the proposition, which became known as the Dantas Project, established the liberation of slaves who were over 60 years old, and would not receive any compensation, besides the increase in taxes paid by slave owners.

The proposal by Dantas became polemic, with conservatives declaring their opposition and liberals dividing themselves. The Chamber approved a motion repudiating the project and, in the course of the political crisis created, Emperor Pedro II dissolved the lower House of Parliament, with the subsequent calling of general elections. The liberation of sexagenarian slaves without receiving compensation was the issue that brought about the greatest disagreement, which continued after the elections, leading Dantas to step down.

The emperor gave José Antônio Saraiva the task of forming a new office. Saraiva was also a liberal politician, but considered more moderate and conciliatory than Dantas. In drafting a new bill, Saraiva included the provision of manumission upon compensation. The Saraiva Office went through a crisis before the measure was approved by the Senate, although it had already received the support of the deputies. Saraiva eventually fell and the new president-designate, the conservative João Maurício Wanderley, Baron of Cotegipe, succeeded in approving the bill without amendments from the senators, although several criticisms continued to be made. On September 28, 1885, the emperor sanctioned the bill, converting it into law.

=== Provisions ===
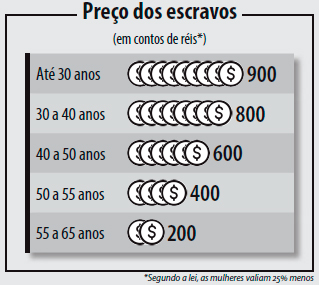
Compensation amounts foreseen in the law by age group. The beginning of each row mentions the age, and the end the price.

The sanctioned text provided for the release of slaves who were over 60 years of age, but not without imposing conditions: before release, there would be mandatory and free service, which would be provided as compensation, paid to their masters. If they reached 65 years of age, the provision of such service would be waived. In addition, the text also established other provisions, including:

- "Remission of the same services [of slavery] is allowed, upon the value not exceeding half of the value arbitrated for slaves of the class of 55 to 60 years of age";
- "All freedmen over 60 years of age, once their time of service has been completed, will remain in the company of their former masters, who will be obliged to feed them, clothe them, and treat them in their illnesses, enjoying the services compatible with their strength, unless they prefer to obtain the means of subsistence elsewhere, and the Orphans' Judges deem them capable of doing so."
- "It is domicile bound for five years, counted from the date of liberation, the municipality where he has been freed, except that of the capital cities."
  - "The one who absconds from his domicile will be considered a vagabond and apprenticed by the Police to be employed in public works or agricultural colonies."
- "The Government will establish at various points in the Empire or in the Provinces agricultural colonial frontiers, governed with military discipline, to which freedmen without occupation will be sent."

== Consequences ==
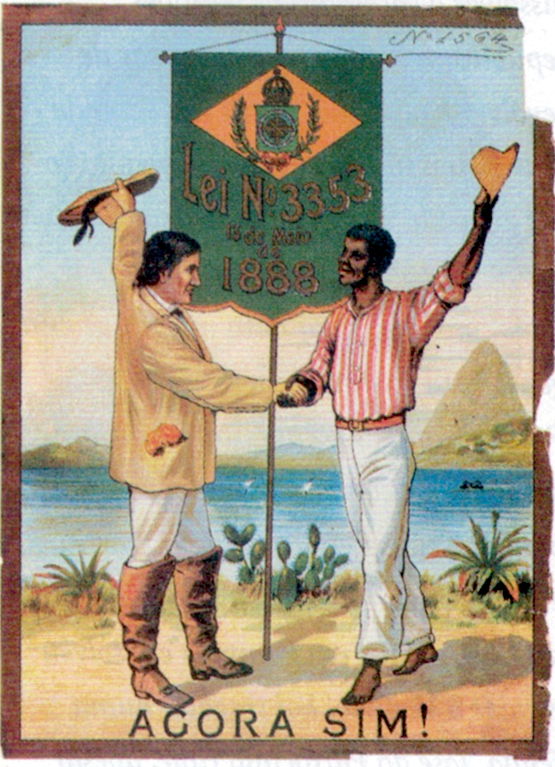
Poster commemorating the Abolition of Slavery in Brazil, which occurred three years after the promulgation of the Sexagenarian Law

The adoption of the Sexagenarian Law produced few practical effects since only a minority of Brazilian slaves were over 60 years old. In 1872, the life expectancy of the general population was 27.4 years, while that of the slaves was 21 years. In 1887, out of a total of 723 thousand slaves, only 28.8 thousand were over 55 years old. Furthermore, the amount paid for slaves was higher for the younger ones, varying from 900 contos de réis (for slaves up to 30 years old) to 200 (for those between 55 and 65).

In 1888, Princess Isabel sanctioned the Lei Áurea, legally putting an end to slavery. Addressing the Sexagenarian Law, historian Emília Viotti da Costa wrote:

"It was a desperate attempt by those who clung to slavery to halt the march of the process. But it was too late. The people had snatched the direction of the movement from the hands of the elites. Abolition had become a popular cause and had the support not only of broad sectors of the popular classes, but also of important sectors of the middle classes, and even of some representatives of the elites. It also had the support of the princess and the emperor. The movement was now uncontrollable. Nothing could stop it."

== See also ==
- Abolitionism in Brazil
- Lei Áurea
- Eusébio de Queirós Law
- Afro-Brazilians

== Bibliography ==
- Estrada, Osório Duque (1918). A Abolição (in Portuguese). Brasília: Senado Federal do Brasil.
