= Ibicaba Farm =

Human settlement in Brazil

The Ibicaba
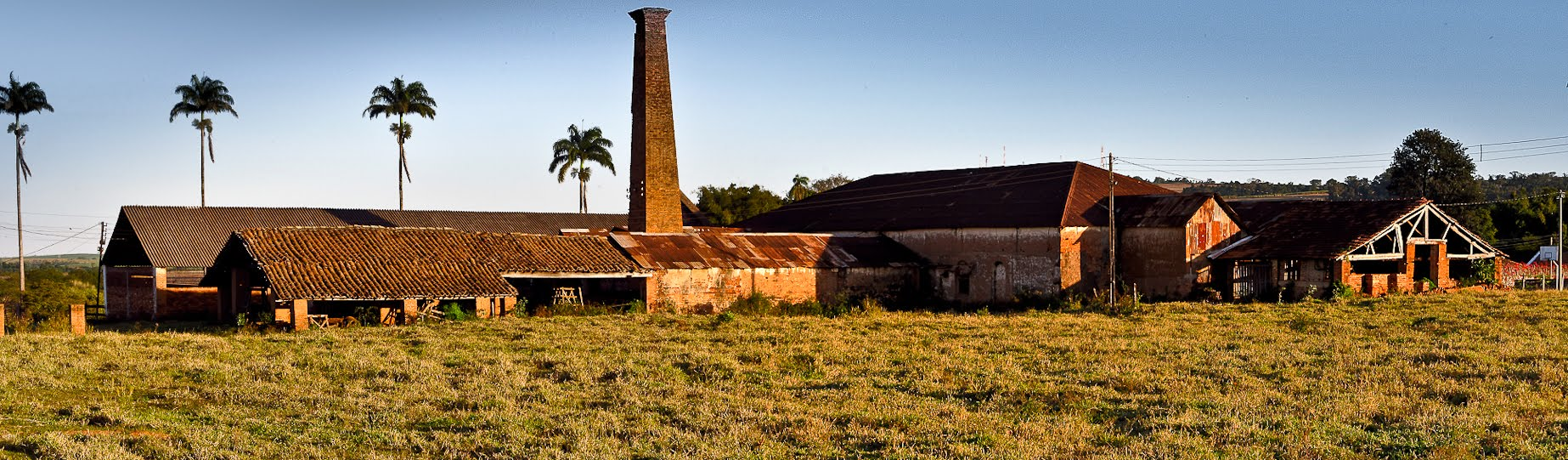
- The hangar of the Ibicaba farm.
- Interactive map of the The Ibicaba area

General information
- Architectural style: Colonial
- Location: Limeira, São Paulo (present day Cordeirópolis, São Paulo), Brazil
- Coordinates: 22°30′10.26″S 47°28′21.18″W
- Construction started: 1817

The Ibicaba Farm (in Portuguese: Fazenda Ibicaba) is one of the most known farms of Brazil. Established in 1817 by senator Nicolau Vergueiro, it was widely known as one of the most macabre symbols of slavery in the province of São Paulo. Afterwards, it became a pioneer in the replacement of the African enslaved by European immigrants' labour and in the use of the steam engine, cart and plough. The Ibicaba has also served as a military headquarters during the Paraguayan War, receiving the Emperor Dom Pedro II, princess Isabel and her husband, the count Gaston of Eu.

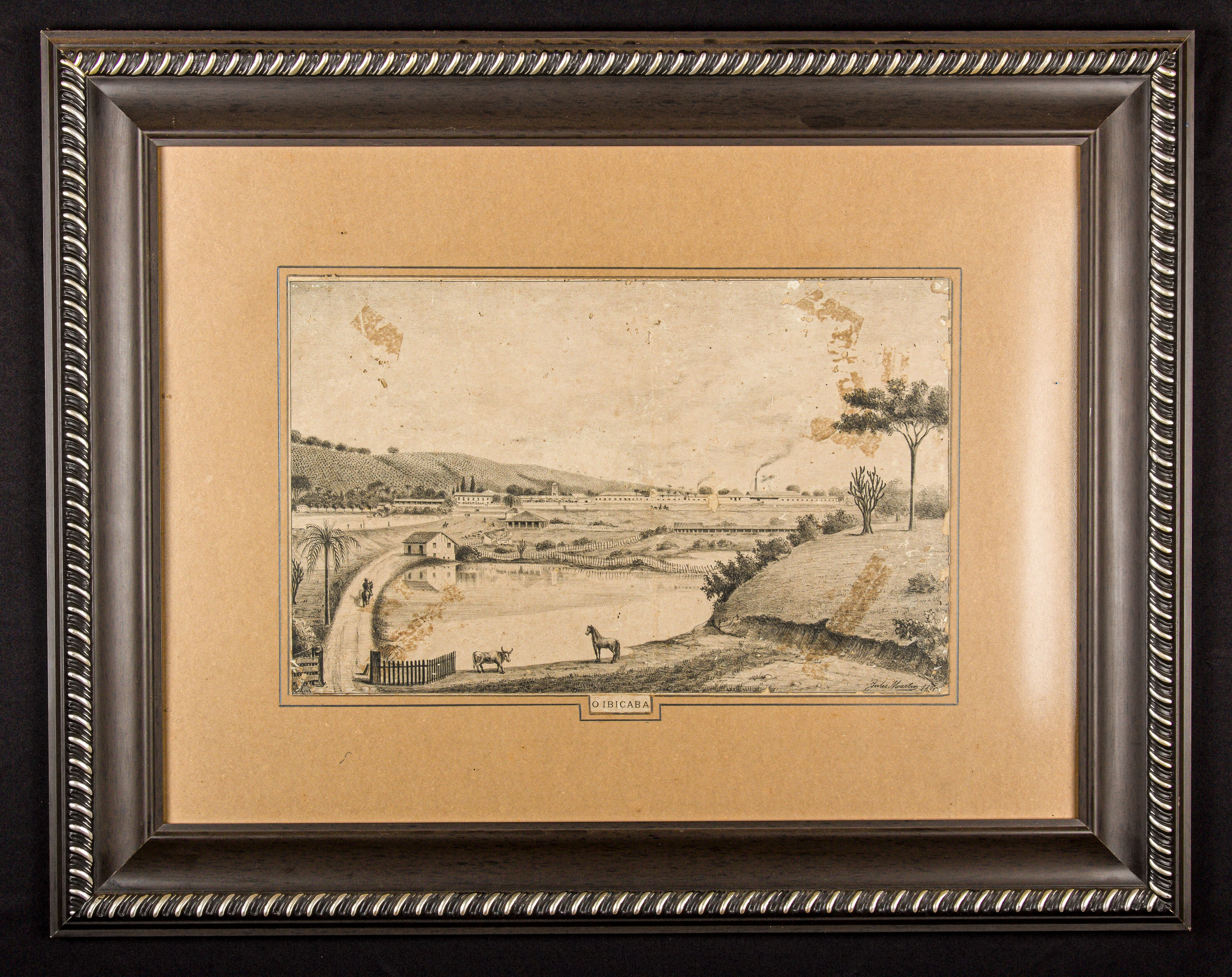
A drawing of Ibicaba farm, 1881

In the 19th century, it was the stage of a revolt of the European immigrants that worked there, led by Thomas Davatz, a Swiss immigrant. The revolt exposed to the European authorities the conditions in which their former citizens lived in Brazil. By 1882, Italian immigration to Brazil grew significantly, encouraging the aftermost massive immigration of Italians to the whole state of São Paulo, including its capital. In 1890, the farm was bought by the Levy family, and then reduced thanks to the allotment and inheritance conditions. In 1975, the farm was sold to the Carvalhaes family, who still own it today. Since the 1990s, it's being used as a museum and tourist site.
