= Lei Áurea =

1888 law abolishing slavery in Brazil

Lei Áurea Golden Law
- Manuscript of the Lei Áurea; Brazilian National Archives

General Assembly of the Empire of Brazil
- Citation: Law No. 3,353 of 13 May 1888
- Territorial extent: Empire of Brazil
- Passed by: Chamber of Deputies
- Passed: 10 May 1888
- Passed by: Senate
- Passed: 13 May 1888
- Signed by: Isabel, Princess Imperial of Brazil
- Signed: 13 May 1888

Legislative history

Initiating chamber: Chamber of Deputies
- Introduced by: Rodrigo Augusto da Silva
- Introduced: 8 May 1888
- First reading: 10 May 1888
- Passed: 10 May 1888

Revising chamber: Senate
- First reading: 11 May 1888
- Second reading: 13 May 1888
- Passed: 13 May 1888

Summary
- Declares slavery extinct in Brazil.

Keywords
- Abolitionism in Brazil, Slavery in Brazil

The Lei Áurea (Portuguese pronunciation: [ˈlej ˈawɾiɐ]; English: Golden Law), officially Law No. 3,353 of 13 May 1888, is the law that abolished slavery in Brazil. It was signed by Isabel, Princess Imperial of Brazil (1846–1921), an opponent of slavery, who acted as regent to Emperor Pedro II, who was in Europe.

The Lei Áurea was preceded by the Rio Branco Law of 28 September 1871 ("the Law of Free Birth"), which freed all children born to slave parents, and by the Saraiva-Cotegipe Law (also known as "the Law of Sexagenarians"), of 28 September 1885, that freed slaves when they reached the age of 60. Brazil was the last country in the Americas to abolish slavery.

== Background ==
For over three centuries, Brazil's national economy relied heavily on slave labor, and the Transatlantic slave trade had been deeply ingrained in the country. Of the 10 million African slaves which were forcibly brought to the New World, 40 percent were brought to Brazil. By the mid-19th century, the slave population in Brazil was approximately 2-2.5 million, an increase from approximately 1 million enslaved individuals in 1822. This increase in the slave population was, in part, a result of increased production of coffee in the northeastern regions of Brazil.

Domestic and international pressure to abolish Brazilian slavery began rising decades before the passing of the Lei Áurea. In 1825, José Bonifácio de Andrada e Silva, a crucial figure in the Brazilian fight for independence, began advocating for gradual abolition. The continued import of African slaves into Brazil was made entirely illegal following the British-Brazilian Treaty of 1826. The treaty promised British recognition of newly-independent Brazil in exchange for the criminalization of the Brazilian slave trade by 1830. The British Navy had also begun seizing slave ships in the Atlantic Ocean, and attacked a number of Brazilian ports. In response to British pressure, slave traders hurried to sell African slaves to Brazil before the ratification of the treaty. This resulted in a spike in the price of African slaves, and an increase in the slave ships travelling to Brazil. By the 1860's, slavery increasingly entered into the national political agenda. Emperor Pedro II came to the view that slavery could no longer be justified amidst increasing international isolation, and that its decline had to be gradual, so as to minimize economic shocks in a transition to free labor. Pedro II was also influenced by the American Civil War, writing in 1864 that the future of slavery in Brazil must be questioned in fear of internal conflict.

The Paraguayan War (1864-1870) was a significant factor in changing pro-slavery sentiment among Brazilian military members. Officers, having fought alongslide enlisted slaves, became increasingly skeptical of the institution of slavery, and less willing to fulfill the Army's order to find runaway slaves. The conflict, alongside growing positivist and republican philosophical movements, helped to push public sentiment towards modernization. Aside from the work of some 230 abolitionist organizations throughout the 1870's and 80's, there were economic factors making slavery increasingly unprofitable as a labor system. The Rio Branco (1871) and Saraiva-Cotegipe (1885) laws collectively limited the supply of African slaves, and thus their ability to meet agricultural and industrial demands. Landowners became increasingly desperate for alternative sources of labor, and thus focused on encouraging European immigration to Brazil. In 1886, the "Sociedade Promotora da Imgração" (Promotion of Immigration Society) was formed among private citizens through governmental contracts with the aim of encouraging European laborers to come to Brazil.

== Text ==
The text of the Lei Áurea was brief:

Art. 1.º: É declarada extinta desde a data desta lei a escravidão no Brasil.
Art. 2.º: Revogam-se as disposições em contrário.
(Article 1: From the date of this law, slavery is declared extinct in Brazil.
Article 2: All dispositions to the contrary are revoked.)

== Analysis ==
The succinctness of the law was intended to make clear that there were no conditions of any kind to the freeing of all slaves. However, it did not provide any support to either freed slaves or their former owners to adjust their lives to their new status: slave owners did not receive any state indemnification, and slaves did not receive any kind of compensation from owners or assistance from the state.

Before the abolition of slavery, slaves were prohibited from owning assets or receiving an education; but after being freed, former slaves were left to make their own way in the world. Without education or political representation, former slaves struggled to gain economic and social status in Brazilian society.

The Lei Áurea was authored by Minister of Agriculture Rodrigo A. da Silva in the cabinet headed by President of the Council of Ministers João Alfredo Correia de Oliveira, and member of the Chamber of Deputies. After passing both houses of the General Assembly, it was sanctioned by Isabel, Princess Imperial of Brazil (1846–1921), who was regent at the time, while her father, Emperor Pedro II, was in Europe.

The Golden Law was signed by the princess imperial and countersigned by Rodrigo A. da Silva, in his capacity as Minister of Agriculture. Princess Isabel, who was a staunch supporter of the abolitionist movement, was awarded the Golden Rose by Pope Leo XIII and minister Rodrigo A. da Silva received honors from the Vatican, France and Portugal. In August 1888 Rodrigo A. da Silva went on to be chosen for a lifetime seat in the Senate of the Empire.

The Lei Áurea had other consequences besides the freeing of Brazilian slaves. Without slave labor, plantation owners had to source workers elsewhere and thus organized. Another effect was an uproar among Brazilian slave owners and upper classes, resulting in the toppling of the monarchy and the establishment of a republic in 1889 – the Lei Áurea is often regarded as the most immediate (but not the only) cause of the fall of monarchy in Brazil.

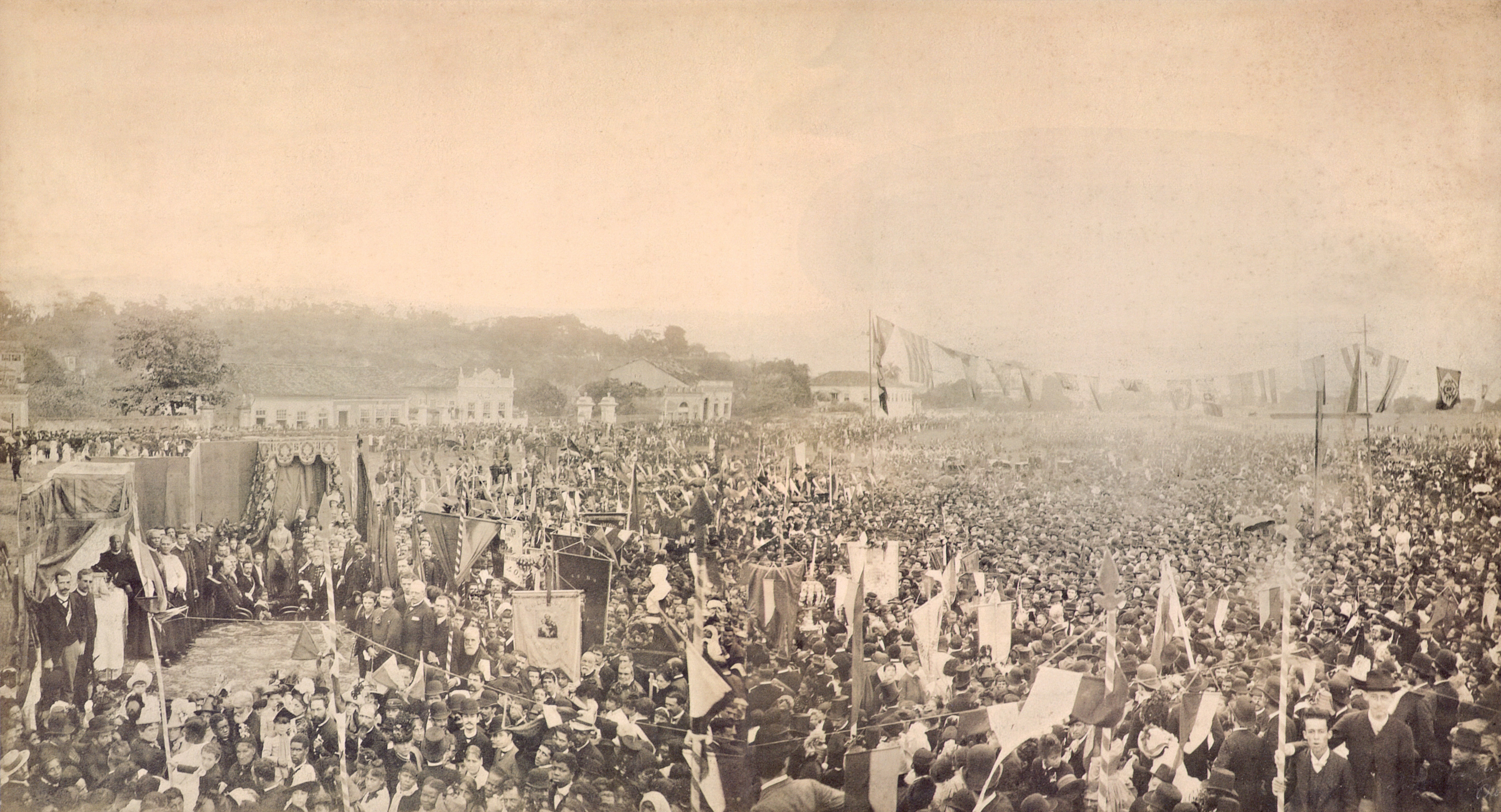
Large open mass celebrated in thanksgiving for the Abolition of Slavery in Brazil, in 1888, in Campo de São Cristóvão. Princess Isabel and Count of Eu are in the left corner, under an imperial tent

== See also ==
- Thirteenth Amendment to the United States Constitution
- Emancipation Proclamation
- Post-abolition in Brazil
