= Jardinópolis =

Jardinópolis may refer to:

- Jardinópolis, Santa Catarina
- Jardinópolis, São Paulo
