= Peter Cochrane =

Peter Cochrane may refer to:

- Peter Cochrane (British Army officer) (1919–2015)
- Peter Cochrane (historian) (born 1950), Australian historian and writer

== See also ==
- Peter Cochran (disambiguation)
