= Cambuquira =

- Municipality
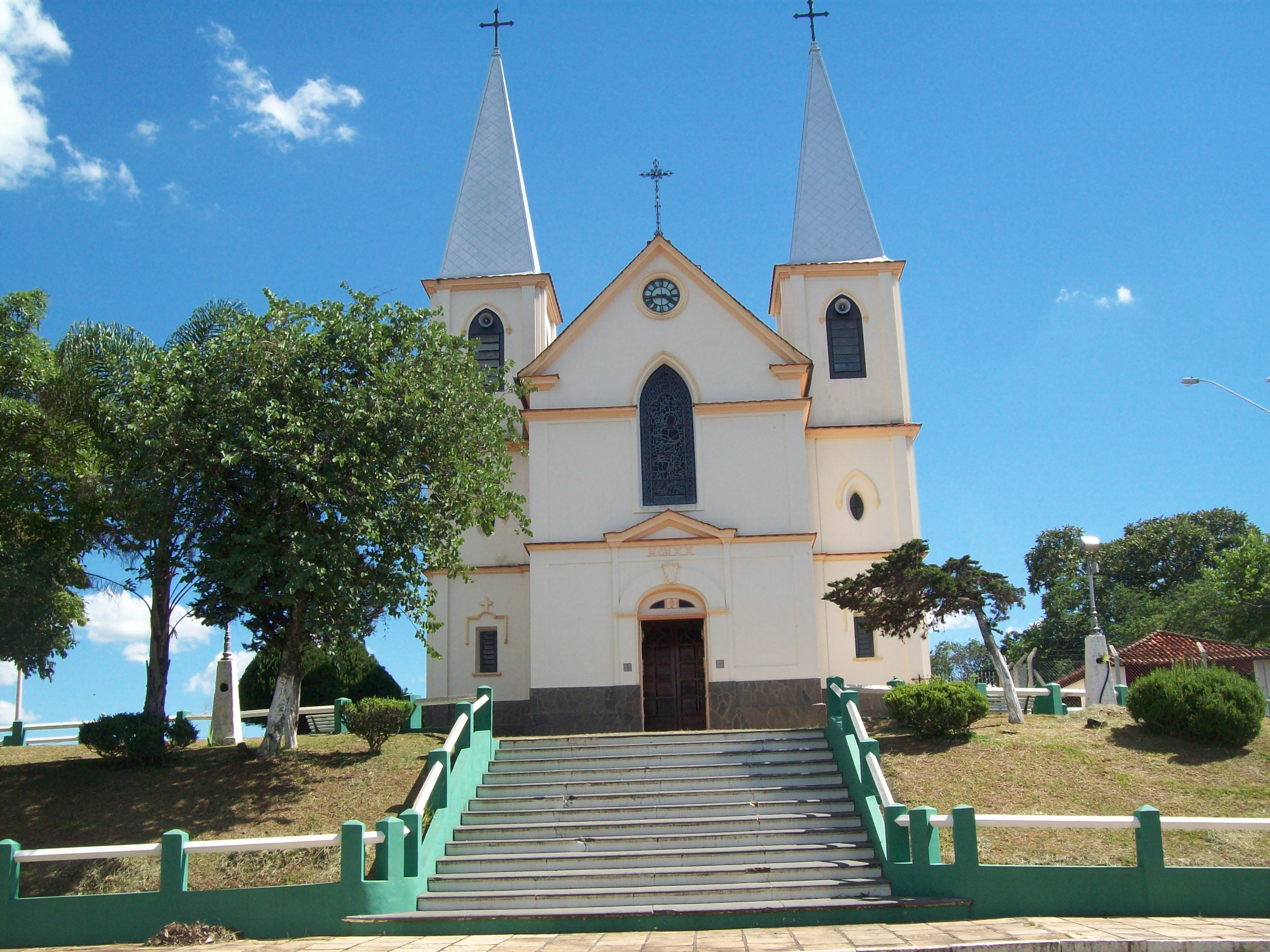
- Saint Sebastian Mother Church

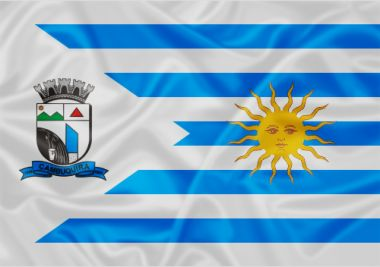
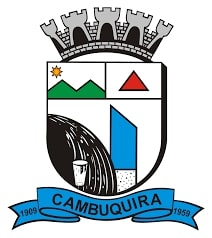
- Flag Coat of arms

- City location in Minas Gerais

- Location within Brazil
- Coordinates: 21°51′07″S 45°17′45″W
- Country: Brazil
- Region: Southeast
- State: Minas Gerais
- Municipal corporation: May 12, 1911

Government
  - Mayor of Cambuquira: Marco Vinícius Marques Félix, PSDB

Area
  - Total: 246 km^{2} (95 sq mi)
- Elevation: 950 m (3,120 ft)

Population (2020)
  - Total: 12,812
  - Density: 52.1/km^{2} (135/sq mi)
- Time zone: UTC-3 (UTC-3)
  - Summer (DST): UTC-2 (UTC-2)

Cambuquira is a Brazilian municipality in the State of Minas Gerais, Brazil. It has approximately 12,812 inhabitants (2020 estimate), and the city is part of the Circuito das Águas ("Water Circuit") of Minas Gerais.

== History ==
It is said that there was a farm (Boa Vista Farm), based at the Plaza of São Francisco. It belonged to three sisters, Ana, Joana and Francisca da Silva Goulart. When they died, they left the farm as inheritance for their ancient slaves, as they had no known heirs. Soon, its mineral waters were discovered, attracting visitors in search of cures attributed to them.

In 1861, the city council of Campanha, dispossessed the lands, considering them as a utility, free to public visits, which allowed development of the outskirts of the town.

In 1872, the "Arraial de Cambuquira" was established in the district of Campanha. In 1894, the Minas and Rio Railroad was inaugurated and the city populated began to grow.

Cambuquira was decreed (Decree #2528) on May 12, 1911, and its first mayor was Dr. Raul de Noronha Sá.

In the following decades, tourism grew up alongside the ranches, until the district was officially declared a "Hydromineral Ranch" in 1970.

Cities of the "Water Circuit": (Lambari, São Lourenço, Cambuquira, Caxambu)

== Tourist attractions ==
=== Parque das Águas (City Water Park) ===
Cambuquira is considered a source of some of the best mineral waters in Brazil, as VIP Exames's research (Abril publishing) of 1997, occupying second place in general classification of the world's mineral waters, just behind the mineral waters of Ty Nant in Wales.

This park has five different fountains, each designated with therapeutic purposes:

- Gaseous Water (Regina Werneck): acute and chronic nephritis, diuresis, gastric movements and secretion stimulating, gastritis, hepatitis, inflammation in biliary channels, intestinal diseases, enteritis, nervous system diseases, dermatosis, eczemas.
- Gaseous Water with Lithium (Roxo Rodrigues): the same therapeutic properties of Regina Werneck's spring, but still indicated for emotional disturbances.
- Water with Magnesium (Comendador Augusto Ferreira): renal function stimulating. Helps with the treatment of hyperuricemia, rheumatism, lithiasis (calculus formation), colitis, pyelitis and nephritis.
- Sulfureous (Dr. Sousa Lima): diuresis, when drunk while fasting; colitis, gastritis, acidity, bowel movements stimulating.
- Ferrous (Dr. Fernandes Pinheiro): anemia, lymphatism.

The park still has a spa with hydrotherapy and physiotherapy, in addition to gardens, playgrounds and a lake with pedalo boats.

Within the park is a forest, where paths allow the walker to have direct contact with native fauna and flora.

=== Parque do Marimbeiro (Marimbeiro’s Water Park) ===
Two kilometers away from the center of the city, this park has six springs that are indicated for cases of digestive system diseases, colitis, lithiasis and hepatic diseases.

=== Igreja Matriz de São Sebastião (Saint Sebastian Church) ===
This church was constructed by Antônio Joaquim da Silva Lemos, José Vicente da Silva, Casimiro José da Costa, Thomé da Silva Lemos, Manoel Martins and José Martins in 1920. It was inaugurated in 1925.

The churchyard is lit by lamps and its tracks are cultivated with garden plants. On its facade, there are two towers with bells. The front door is cushioned and worked; above it there is a large stained-glass window and a clock.

Inside, there is a choir with a parapet. The nave is simple with ceramic paving, a ceiling with wooden laths, stained-glass windows, and four side-doors. The main altar is simple, and there is a sculpture of Saint Sebastian. At the sides there are two shrines turned to the nave. At the far end, there is a sacristy.

The church can be reached from the Bandeira's Plaza, along the Virgílio de Melo Franco Avenue (“Rua Direita”), and turning on the Marechal Deodoro Avenue.

=== Vale do Sol (Sun’s Valley) ===
There is a viewpoint on the dirt road that leads to Congonhal village; a tree with a twisted trunk marks where one might point have the best sunset view. The same road leads to the Congonhal waterfalls, a sequence of little falls and natural wells.

=== Alto do Cruzeiro (Cruzeiro’s High) ===
Also known as Santa Quitéria's High, the site is an altitude of 1,114 metres and offers views of the surrounding city and coffee plantations. The city of São Thomé das Letras can be seen from the site. A large cross is also located there.

=== Pico do Piripau (Piripau’s Peak) ===
The peak is at the Serra das Águas, at an altitude of 1,372 metres. There is a marvellous view of the cities of Cambuquira, São Thomé das Letras, Três Corações and Lambari, besides many farms and coffee plantations.

At the peak is the Cambuquira hang-gliding North Ramp. It has 400 meters of fall, natural take-off for three gliders simultaneously, and a large area for equipment hook-up. The best season for flying is from August to November. The Cambuquira Hang-Gliding Club (CVLC - Clube de Vôo Livre de Cambuquira) is a non-profit club ,orthe encouragement of hang-gliding in Cambuquira and region. The club was fuounded n November 1997. It can be reached by taking the road to Caxambu and entering the dirt road beside the Lua Luana Inn.

=== Waterfalls ===
- Salto das Sete Cachoeiras,
- Cascata do Congonhal (3 km),
- da Usina (18 km),
- São Bento, e
- do Hilton.

=== Observatório Centauro (Centauro Observatory) ===
The Study Center of Astronomy was funded at 1961 and it serves both astronomers and local schools.

== Rivers ==
Lambari, Lambarizinho e São Bento.

== Patron Saint ==
- Saint Sebastian (20 January)

=== Others ===
- Laura Motta (13 February)

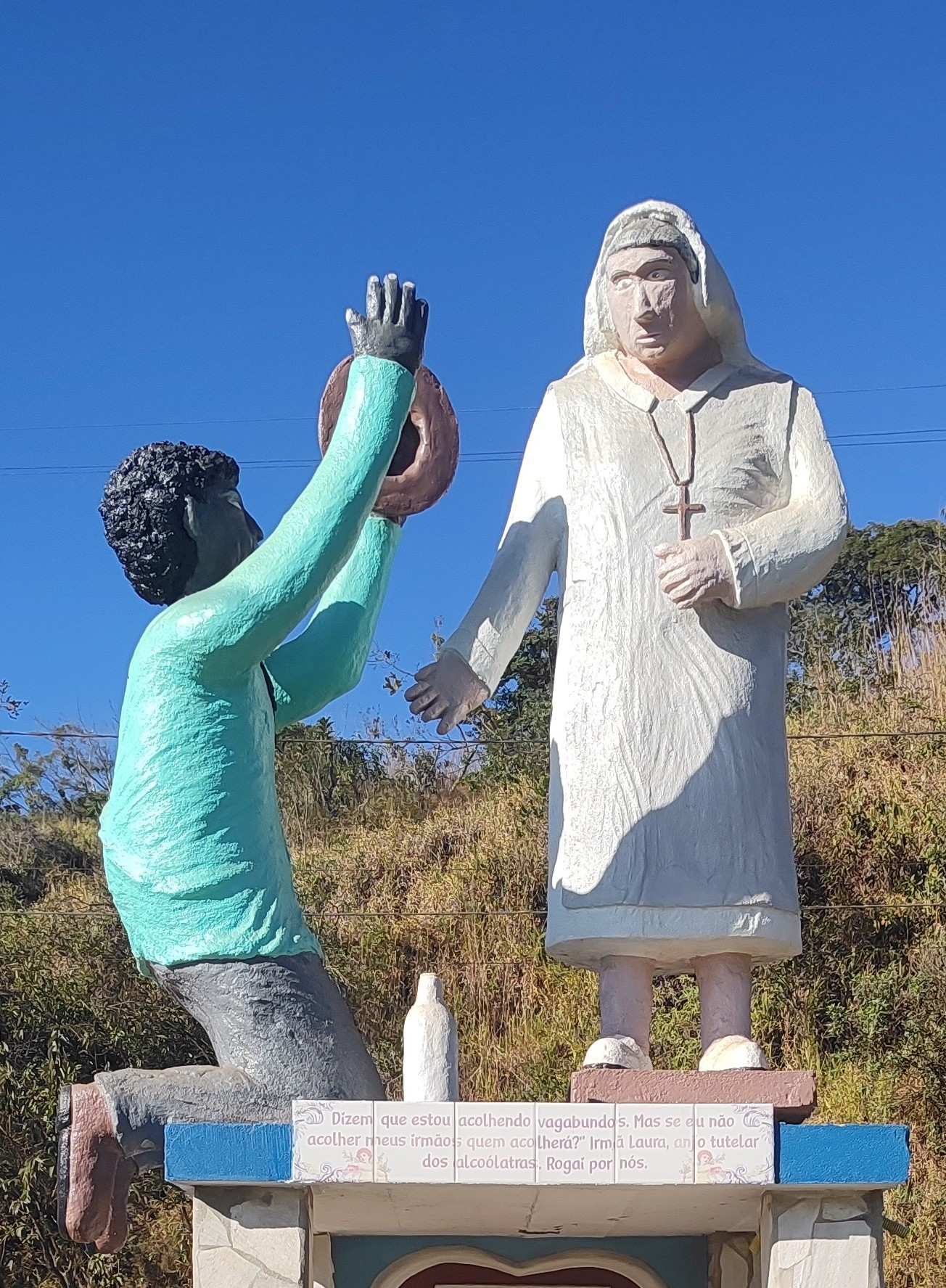

== Old Names ==
- São Sebastião de Cambuquira, e
- Águas Virtuosas de Cambuquira.

== See also ==
- List of municipalities in Minas Gerais
