= Antônio da Silva Jardim =

Brazilian lawyer and journalist

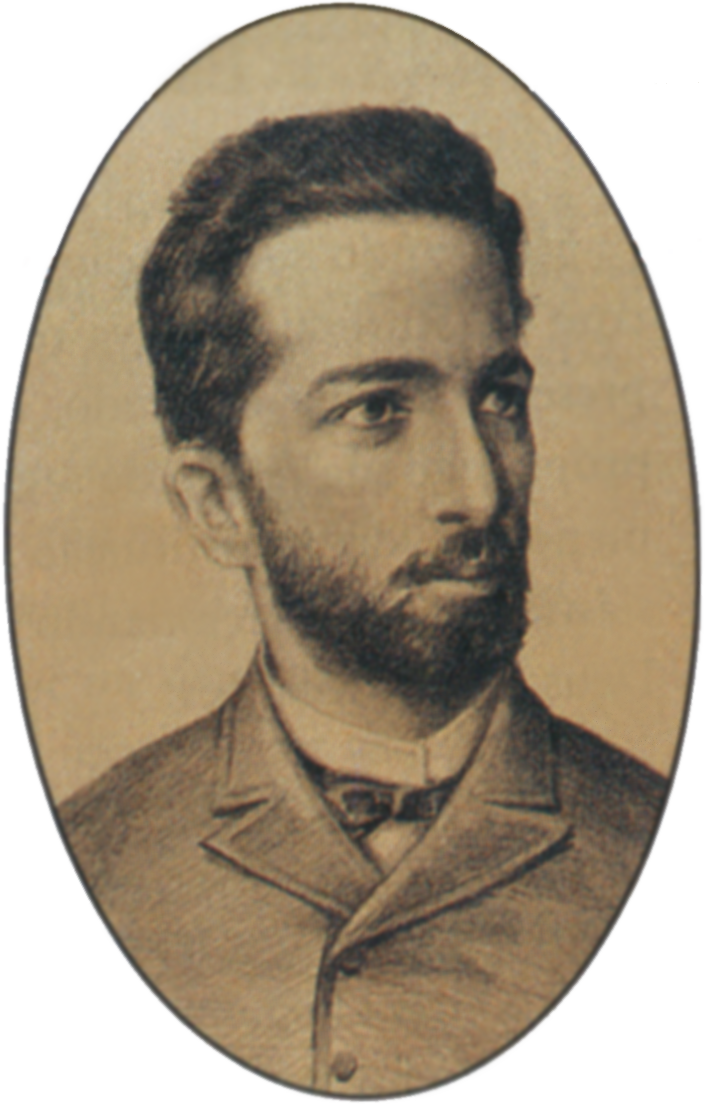
Antônio da Silva Jardim

Antônio da Silva Jardim (18 August 1860 — 1 July 1891) was a Brazilian lawyer and journalist. He was a political activist in the abolitionist and republican movements, particularly in Rio de Janeiro state.

== Early life ==
He was born in Vila de Nossa Senhora da Lapa de Capivari, which later changed its name to commemorate him. He was the son of Gabriel da Silva Jardim and Felismina Leopoldina de Mendonça. His father was a humble teacher in Capivara. Antônio was sent to Niterói to study, initially at the Colégio Silva Pontes. In 1874 he enrolled at the Colégio de São Bento, where he studied Portuguese, French, geography and Latin. He also helped found a student magazine which provided the starting point for his political life and his campaign for liberty.

His family’s lack of financial resources eventually compelled him to move lodgings and enrol in the Jasper school. He worked to pay his way, and was eventually employed by the school where he studied.

In 1878 he enrolled at the Law School, University of São Paulo. Soon he was taking part in the political world of the faculty, where republican and abolitionist ideas were widely held and shared, and editing the journal Tribuna Liberal. He joined a number of secret societies, including the Freemasonry, and was involved in abolitionist direct action together with academic colleagues, including smuggling escaping slaves to places of safety outside the province.

In 1881, he adopted the philosophical views of Auguste Comte and founded the first positivist centre in São Paulo. Graduating in 1882, he began practising as a lawyer, taking up the cause of Brazil’s slaves. In 1883 he married Ana Margarida, daughter of Martim Francisco de Andrada, President of the Law School, owner of the Tribuna Liberal, President of the Chamber of Deputies and Finance Minister of the Empire of Brazil. In 1884 his first son was born, but in 1885 he died, as did a second child, a daughter, shortly after her birth.

== Political activism ==
The flag of Brazil proposed by Silva Jardim

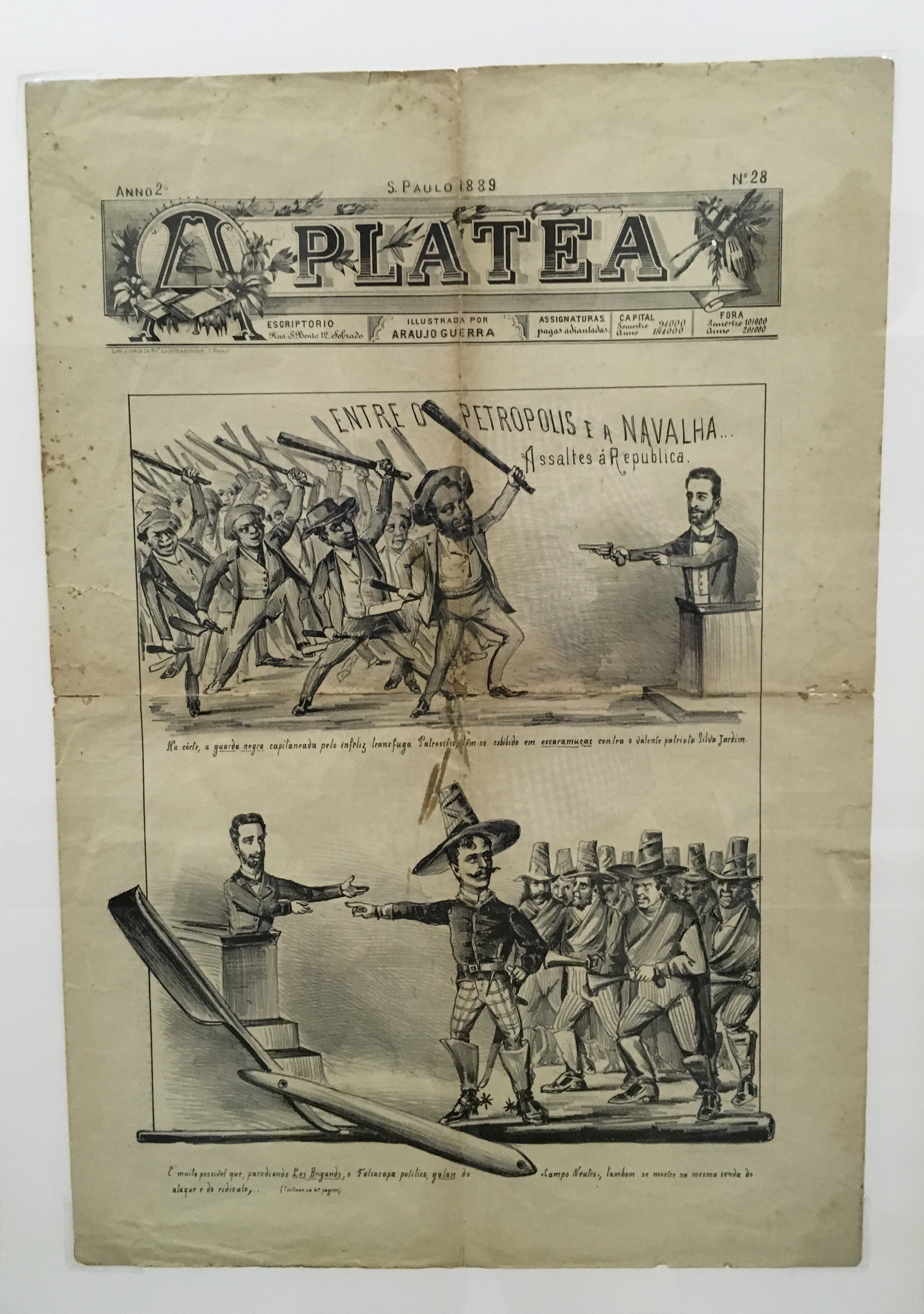
Antônio da Silva Jardim menaced by José do Patrocínio and other political enemies

In 1887 another son was born, on 14 July; as this was Bastille Day the boy was named Danton Condorcet. By this time he had thrown himself completely into the campaign for a republic, to the extent of giving up his place at the bar and dissolving his partnership with Martim Francisco Ribeiro de Andrada III. On January 28, 1888 he held the first republican rally in the country. From then until the end of 1889, he dedicated himself to the republican campaign, traveling between Rio de Janeiro, São Paulo and Minas Gerais. His outspokenness earned him many enemies and on one occasion his life was threatened by the ultramonarchist Guarda Negra.

For his activism he was both praised and acclaimed as well as persecuted and stoned. Since childhood his health had been fragile because of malaria - and his frantic life now weakened his health again, but he did not allow this to interfere with his constant political activity. However after the Proclamation of the Republic, the Brazilian army, having secured power, largely left him to one side. Because of his radicalism, he was excluded from the Republican Party. After the establishment of the Republic, little by little, he was sidelined by the wider republican government. He stood for election to Congress in the Federal District but was defeated.

== Death ==
He therefore decided to retire from politics and travel overseas to rest, clear his ideas and discovering new people and places. He went to Portugal, France, Holland, Belgium and England. At the age of thirty he visited Pompeii in Italy and was interested in visiting Vesuvius, despite being warned that it might erupt at any moment. He went up and was swallowed up by a vent which opened in the crater. It is not known for certain whether this was an accident.

As reported in the magazine A Pátria Mineira on 29 June 1891, the death of Silva Jardim was an accident, according to a guide and his friend Joaquim Carneiro de Mendonça. According to this account Silva Jardim was swallowed up by a vent while Carneiro de Mendonça was able to save himself with the help of the local guide, although he was injured.

After his death his wife gave birth to their fourth child. Because of the hardship his family found itself in, the Chamber of Deputies voted to grant her a pension.

== Legacy ==
The municipality of Silva Jardim in Rio de Janeiro took its name from the journalist. Another municipality to adopt a form of his name was Jardinópolis, in São Paulo, in 1896.

== Works ==
- O General Osório (1879)
- A Crítica de Escada Abaixo (1880)
- Memórias e Viagens (1891, published posthumously)
- Propaganda Republicana (1978, published posthumously)
