= Álvaro Pires (footballer) =

Brazilian footballer

Personal information
- Full name: Álvaro Henrique Alves Pires
- Date of birth: March 11, 1985 (age 41)
- Place of birth: Jardinópolis, São Paulo, Brazil
- Height: 5 ft 10 in (1.78 m)
- Position: Defensive midfielder

Team information
- Current team: Nacional-AM

Youth career
- 2002–2003: Internacional

Senior career*
Years	Team	Apps	(Gls)
2004–2006	Internacional	13	(0)
2007–2009	Spartak Nalchik		
2008	→ Los Angeles Galaxy (loan)	19	(1)
2009	→ Fortaleza (loan)	1	(0)
2010–2011	Luverdense	14	(0)
2012–	Nacional-AM		
- * Club domestic league appearances and goals as of October 26, 2011

Álvaro Henrique Alves Pires (born March 11, 1985), or simply Álvaro Pires, is a Brazilian footballer who plays as a defensive-midfielder, he currently plays for Nacional Futebol Clube.

A native of Jardinópolis, Brazil (just outside São Paulo), Pires signed his first professional contract at the age of 16 with Brazilian side Internacional and broke into the first team at the age of 19. He spent three years there, appearing in a handful of games, before signing with Russian side Spartak Nalchik, then of the Russian First Division.

Pires had been on trial with Los Angeles Galaxy during the club's pre-season, featuring in the inaugural Pan-Pacific Championship in Hawaii, and featuring on their Asian tour in China and Hong Kong. Having impressed Galaxy coach Ruud Gullit with his performances, Pires signed a full professional contract with Galaxy on March 28, 2008..

He made his MLS debut in Galaxy's first match of the 2008 season against Colorado Rapids on March 29, 2008, and scored his first MLS goal on June 7, 2008 - also against Colorado.
