= James Aikman Cochrane =

Scottish soldier of the British Army

James Aikman Cochrane MC (29 June 1888 – 12 November 1948) was a Scottish soldier of the British Army who won the Military Cross and the Belgian Croix de Guerre avec Palme and Croix de Chevalier de l'Ordre de Leopole during the First World War.

Cochrane was born in Maybole, Ayrshire. With his wife, Margarita "Rita" Forrest McIlvride, he had two children, daughter Marigold and son Peter Cochrane. Their son won a Military Cross during the Second World War in the Western Desert in 1940 and a Distinguished Service Cross in 1941 during the Battle of Keren. He later worked as a civil engineer. He died in London in 1949.
