= Peter Cochran =

Peter Cochran may refer to:

- Peter Cochran (politician) (born 1945), Australian politician

== See also ==
- Peter Cochrane (disambiguation)
