= Louise Cochrane =

English screenwriter and producer

- Born: Louise Morley; 22 December 1918; New York
- Died: 13 February 2012 (aged 93)
- Education: Bryn Mawr College, Pennsylvania
- Occupations: Writer; Television producer

Louise Cochrane (22 December 1918 – 13 February 2012) was an American-born writer and television producer best known for creating the BBC Children's TV programme Rag, Tag and Bobtail in the early 1950s. She also wrote a series of career guidance books for young people and a biography of the 12th-century philosopher Adelard of Bath.

== Early life ==
Louise Cochrane (née Morley) was born in New York on 22 December 1918. Her father, Christopher Morley, was a writer. After attending Hunter College High School she enrolled at Bryn Mawr College in Pennsylvania to study politics. After graduating in 1940 she spent a short time working for Eleanor Roosevelt, wife of American President Franklin D Roosevelt. Later that year she joined the International Student Service, (Note: The International Student Service was a refugee aid group, for which Cochrane worked until 1944.) with responsibility for organising its conference programme. There in 1942 she met Scotsman Peter Cochrane, a delegate visiting from Britain, within a year she had joined him in England, and the couple were married a few weeks later.

== Career ==
Cochrane joined the BBC in 1948 as a producer of schools' news and current affairs programmes, and was appointed to the Fulbright Commission two years later. In 1953 Cochrane wrote the first of her 26 episodes of Rag, Tag and Bobtail, a children's television series that "continues to be remembered with affection". She also wrote a series of four books giving career guidance for young people.

In 1958 Cochrane moved with her husband and two daughters to Sussex, where she took up secondary school teaching. Ten years later the family moved to the area around Bath, which along with her keen interest in mathematics, and geometry in particular, triggered Cochrane's long-standing interest in the 12th-century philosopher Adelard of Bath, of whom she published a biography in 1994.

== Later life ==
The Cochranes relocated to Edinburgh in 1979, where Louise remained active despite her failing eyesight. She died on 13 February 2012 aged 93, survived by her husband and daughters Alison and Janet.

== Selected works ==
- Digest of British History (1954), with Peter Cochrane
- Rag, Tag, and Bobtail and the Mushrooms (1954)
- Rag, Tag, and Bobtail of TV's Watch with Mother programme (1955), with Elizabeth Williams and Sam Williams
- Marion Turns Teacher (1955)
- Sheila Goes Gardening (1957)
- Social Work for Jill (1959)
- Anne in Electronics (1960)
- Cochrane Puppet Book (1962)
- The Puppet Book of Play Ideas and Things-To-Do (1962) with Susan Holland
- Highland Summer (1963)
- The U.S.A. and her people (1964)
- Shadows in Colour (1972)
- Shadow Puppets in Colour (1972)
- Tabletop Theatres (1973)
- Adelard of Bath: First English Scientist (1994)
- The sense of significance : the friendship between Christopher Morley and Buckminster Fuller (2015)
