= São Thomé das Letras =

São Tomé das Letras
- Municipality
- Municipality of São Tomé das Letras
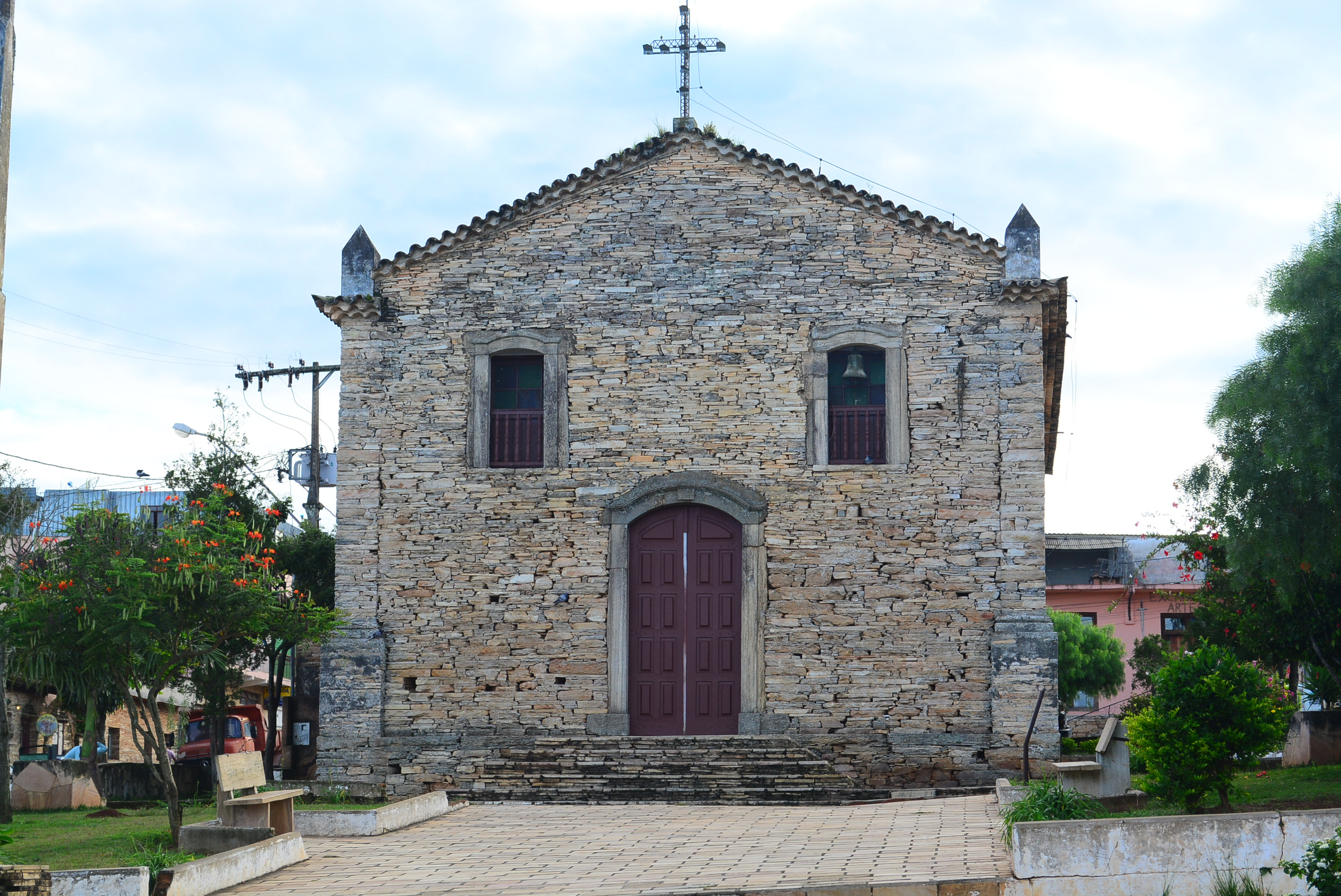
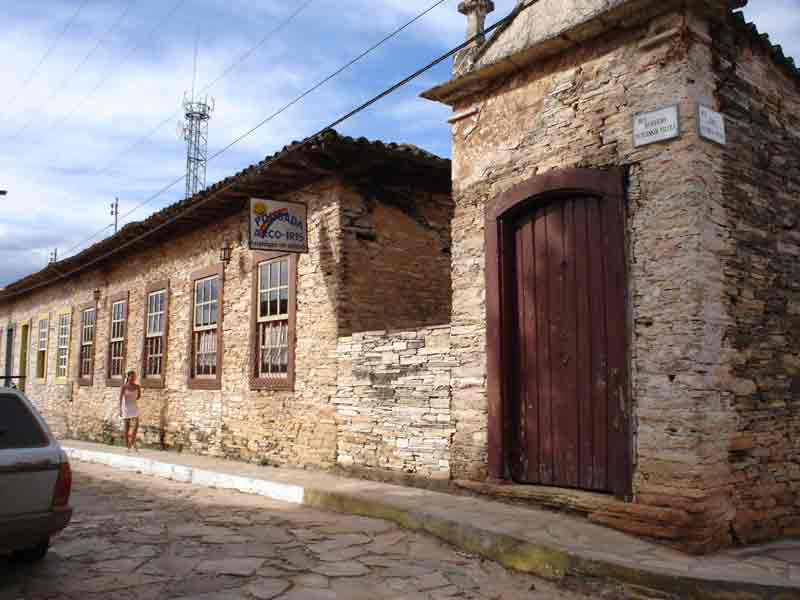
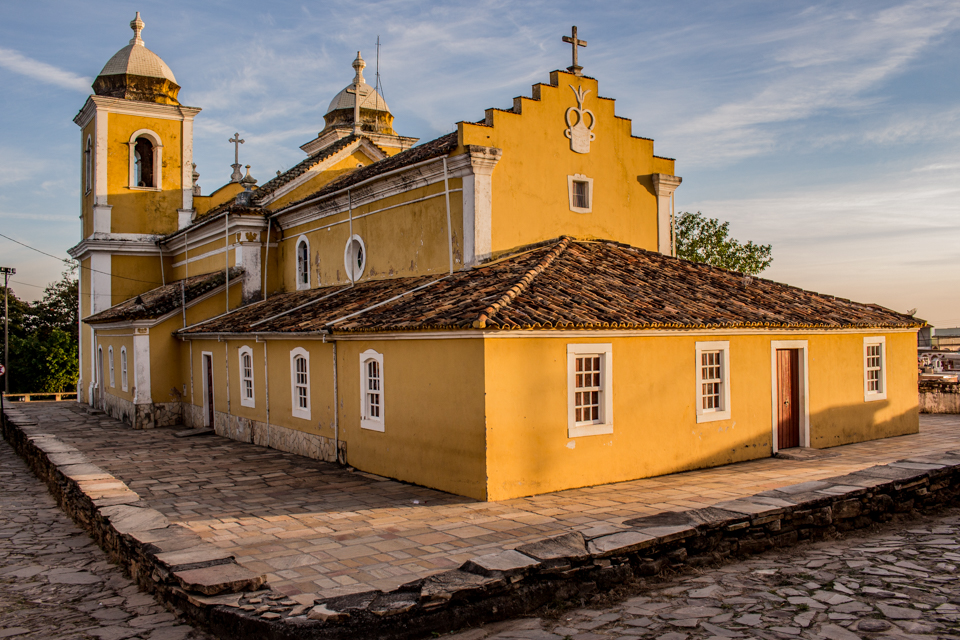
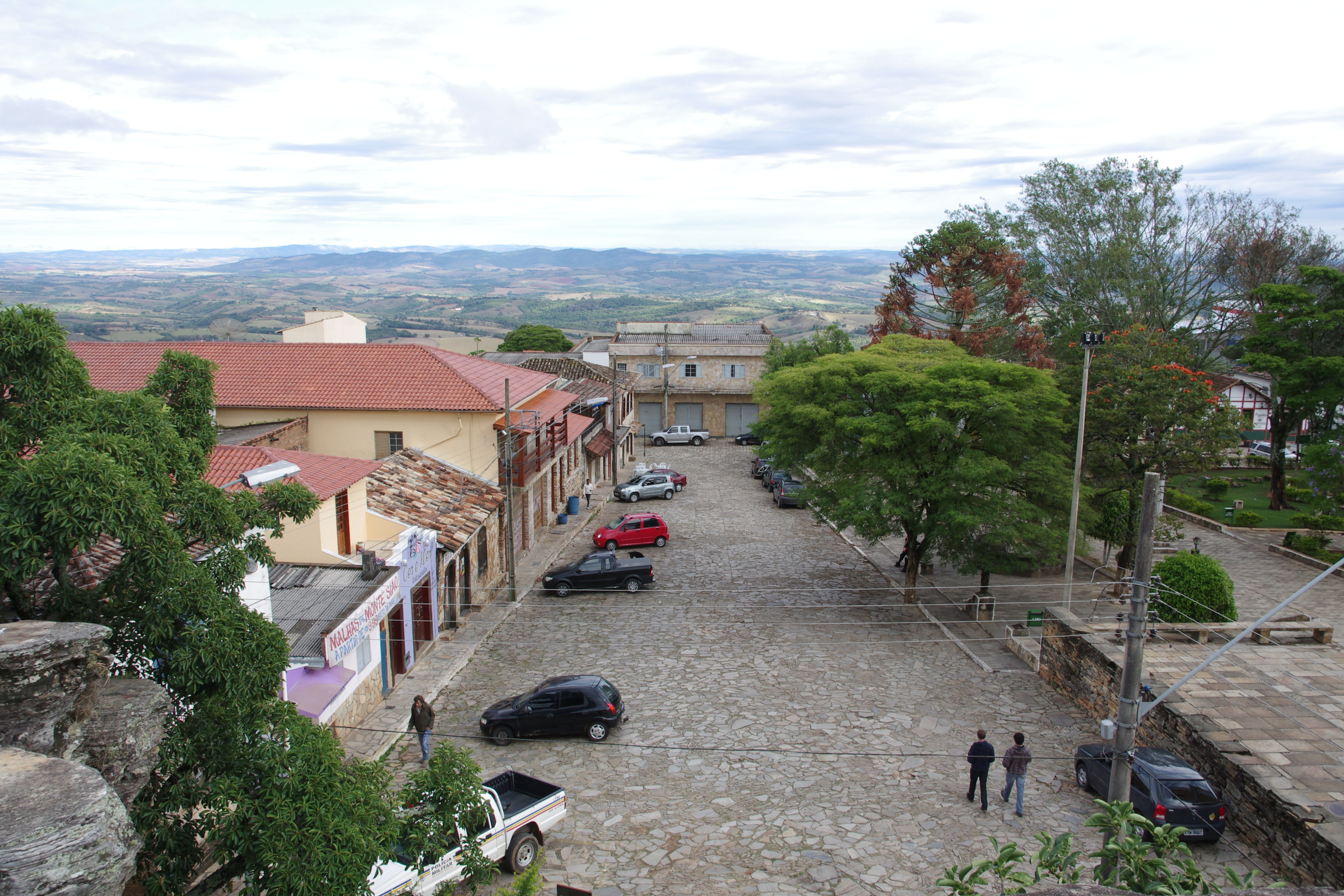
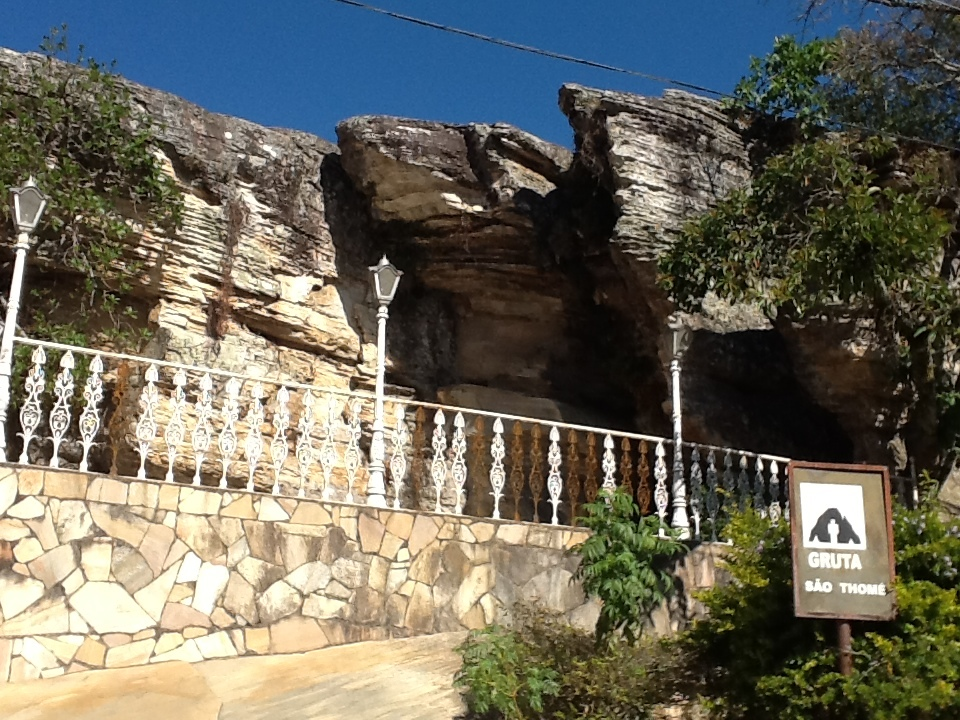
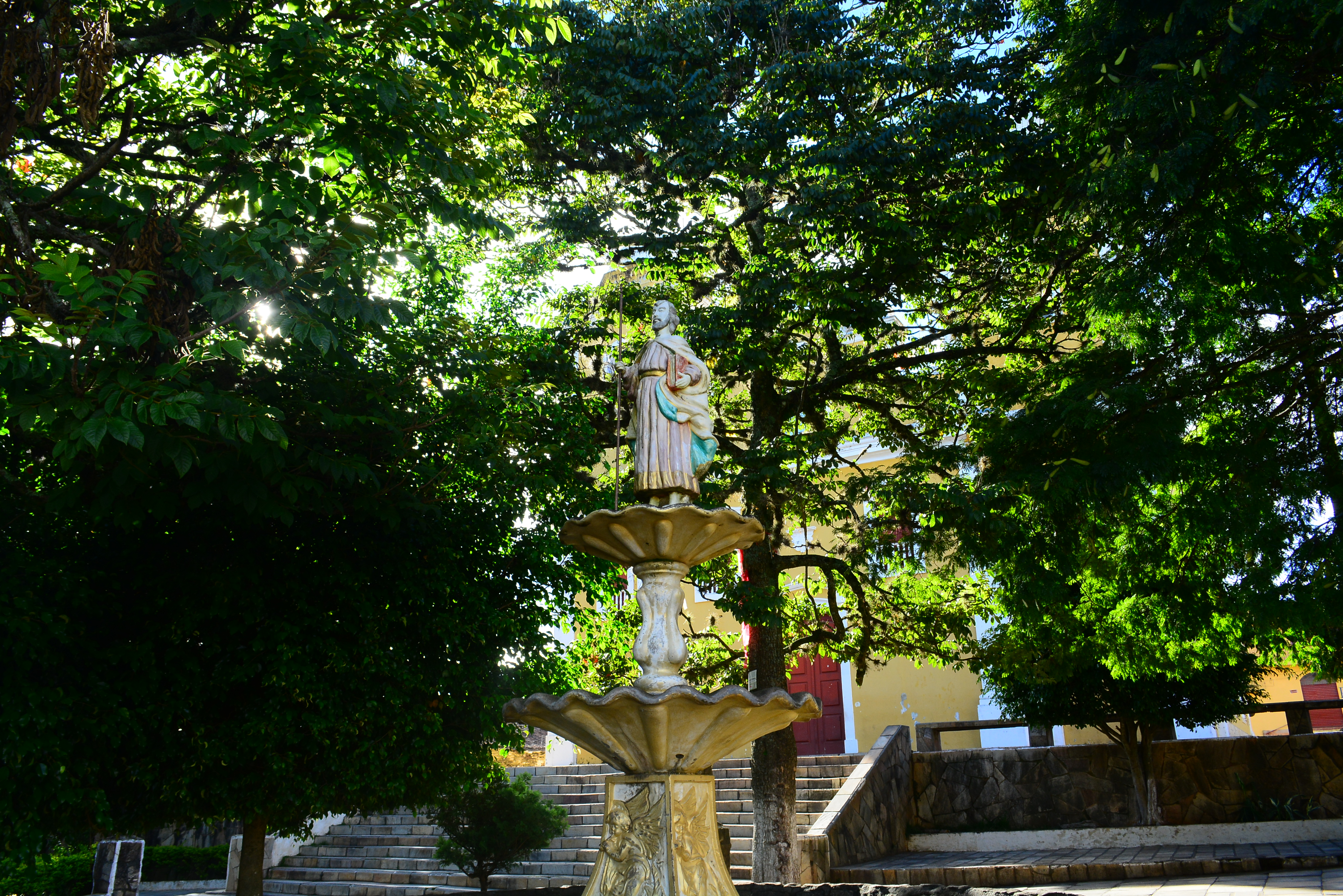
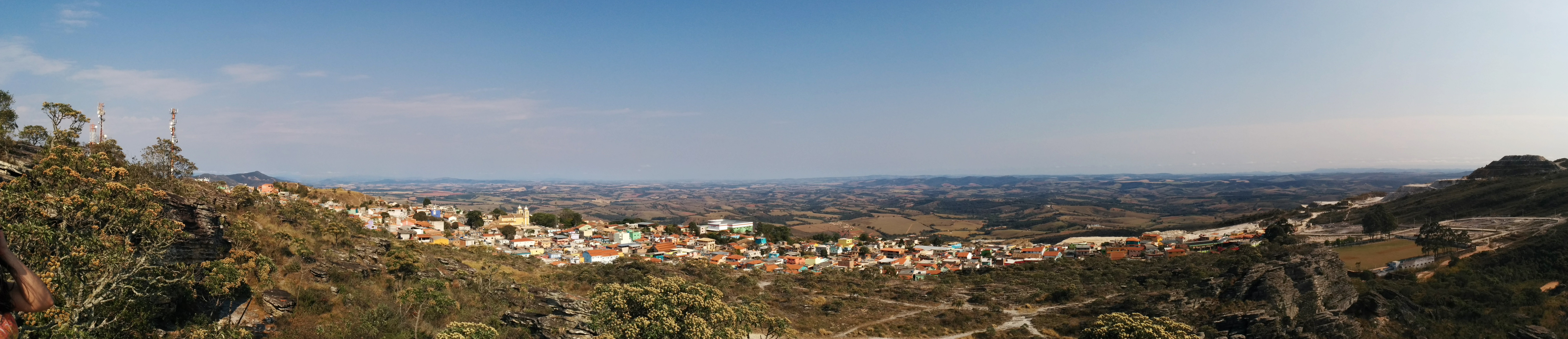

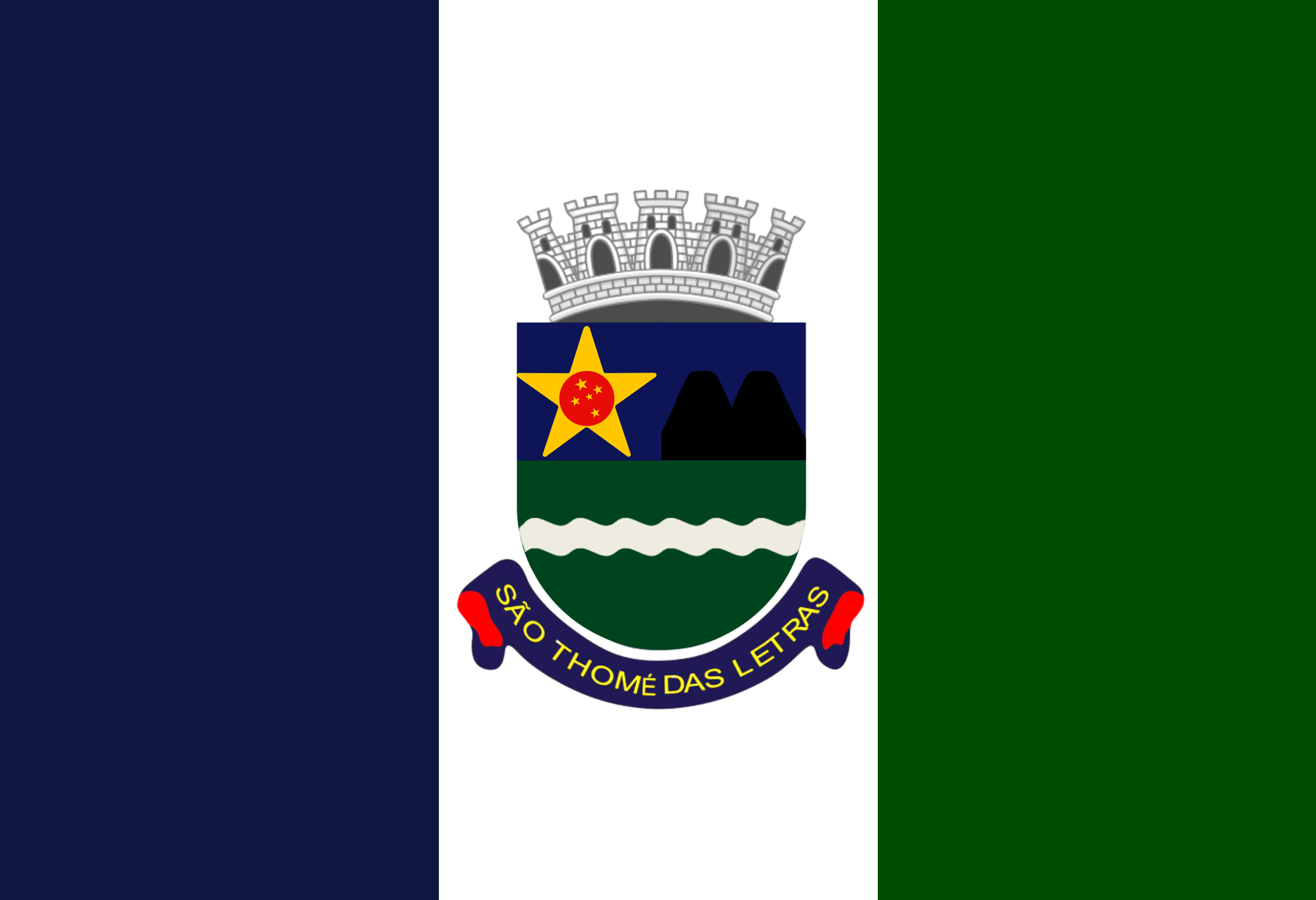
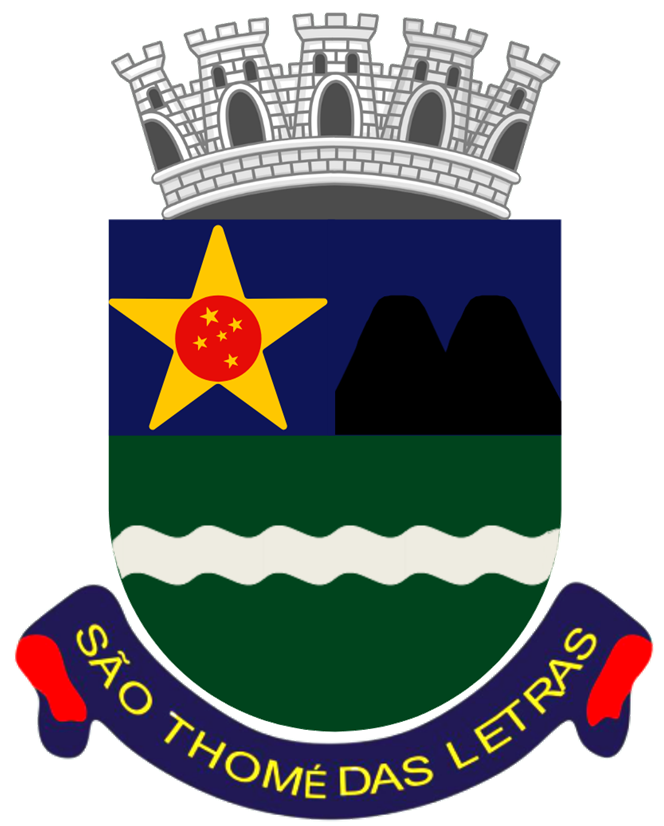
- Flag Coat of arms

- Location of São Tomé das Letras in the State of Minas Gerais

- Location in Brazil
- Coordinates: 21°43′19″S 44°59′6″W
- Country: Brazil
- Region: Southeast Region
- State: Minas Gerais

Area
  - Total: 369.5 km^{2} (142.7 sq mi)
- Elevation: 1,440 m (4,720 ft)

Population (2020)
  - Total: 7,120
  - Density: 18/km^{2} (47/sq mi)
- Time zone: UTC−3 (BRT)
- HDI (2010): 0.667 – medium

São Thomé das Letras is a municipality in the south of Minas Gerais state in southeastern Brazil, 35 kilometres (22 mi) east of Três Corações city. It has a population of 7,120 (2020) with a population density of 18 inhabitants per square kilometer. São Thomé das Letras covers 369.75 square kilometres (142.76 mi^{2}).

== Economic activities ==
The major economic activities are stone mining and natural tourism deeply focused on the alternative lifestyle. São Thomé das Letras has a large number of waterfalls, natural jungle (known as "Mata Atlântica") and cave systems.

== History ==
The name of the town was based on a legend of a black slave on the run from the plantation of the powerful Baron of Alfenas. He found a statue of Saint Thomas with a perfectly written letter with superb calligraphy (impossible for an illiterate untrained slave) in a grotto. Greatly amazed by the story the Baron freed the slave and later ordered the construction of a church beside of the grotto in what it is now the centre of São Thomé das Letras.

The Cataguá Indians inhabited the region until the 18th century when they were expelled by the bandeirantes, Portuguese settlers who settled the interior of Brazil.

Construction of the cathedral of São Thomé das Letras began in 1785. It was ultimately decorated with paintings in the Brazil baroque style by Joaquim José da Natividade.

In the 19th century farmers from the region built homes in São Thomé das Letras to use during festival periods, remaining empty the rest of the year.

Quartzite mining began in the early 20th century and became a major part of the economic activity of the town.

One of the images by Joaquim José da Natividade was stolen in 1991.

During the 2020 pandemics, the city closed its doors to visiting tourists citing concernings about virus spreading, to this day (July, 26) there's not a single case of COVID-19 reported among the inhabitants, but the already fragile touristic economy is suffering greatly, according to G1 Sul de Minas São Thomé das Letras.

== Geological features ==
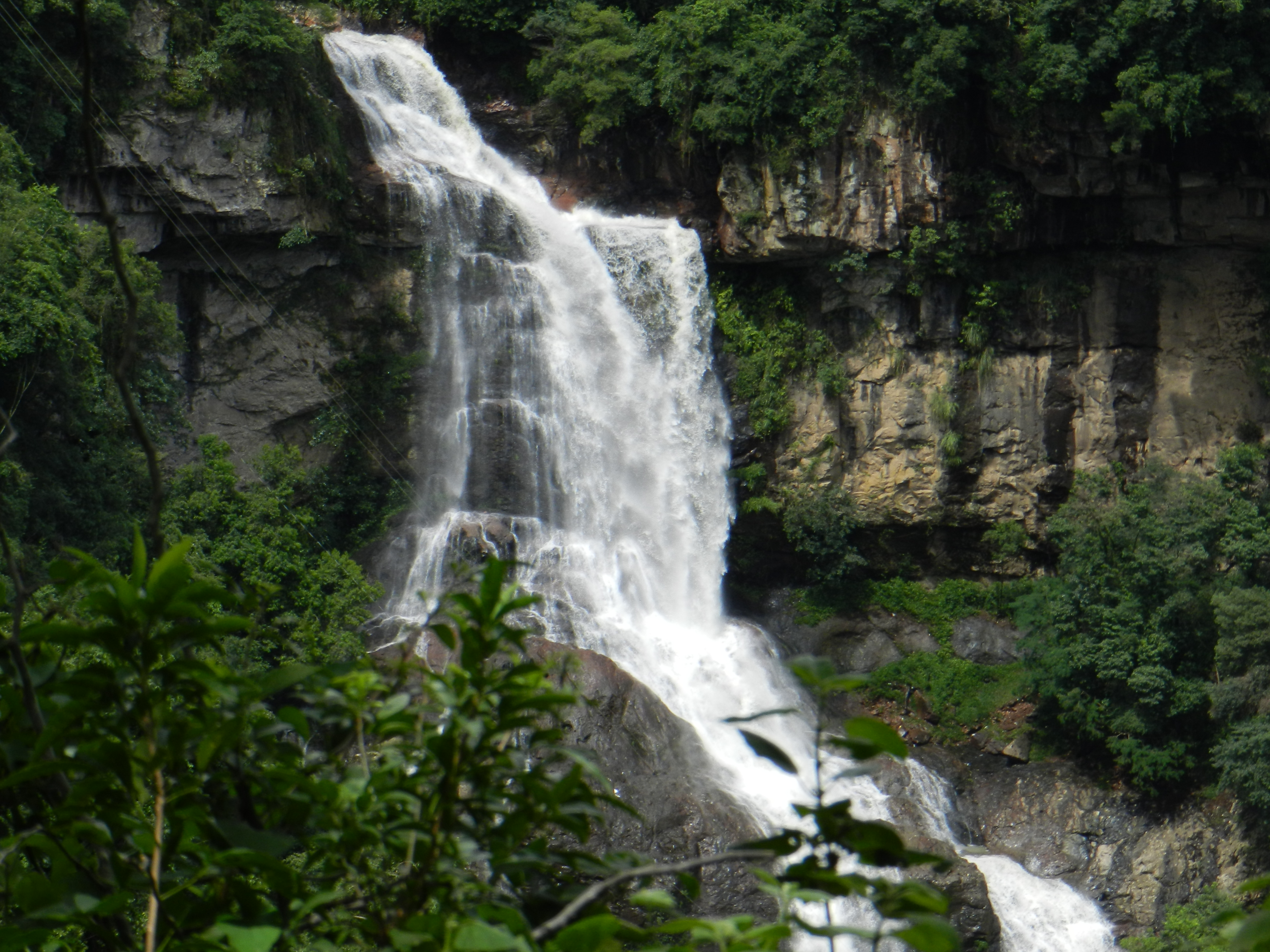
The "Bridal Veil"

The environmeant of São Thomé das Letras is typical of its surroundings, built on a wide mineral quartzite deposit - known as rock-of-saint-thome. These rocks have also been used in the construction of some houses in the town, the stone pavement of the streets and, currently, in the creation of local handcrafts.

Its elevation, at points 1,440 meters above sea level, allows for a panoramic view of enclosed region around it. This makes the town a preferred destination of tourists interested in nature. A soap opera of the now defunct Manchete TV also attracted tourists to the area.

There are several notable attractions in the area: the Grotto of São Thomé, Carimbado Grotto, Pyramid House (a mysterious and currently abandoned Scorpio-shaped quartzite house), rock formations - of which the Witch is the most famous, constructions in the rocks, and several waterfalls - Shangri-lá, Eubiose, Bridal Veil (Véu da Noiva), Paradise and the Moon, among others.

== Mysticism ==
Some believe that São Thomé das Letras is one of the seven energy points of the Earth, which is a main attraction for mystics, spiritualists, scientific and alternative societies. All those elements give to the town the title of "mystic". The town's most famous legend involves a mystical character named Chico Taquara who the locals believe to have control of animals and who vanished inside the Carimbado cave long ago. It is not unusual to hear about UFO sightings; many people climb the hill near to the "Casa da Pirâmide" looking for signs of UFOs or aerial phenomena.

== See also ==
- List of municipalities in Minas Gerais
