= Peter Cochrane (British Army officer) =

British Army officer

Peter Cochrane, c. 1941

James Aikman 'Peter' Cochrane, DSO, MC (12 May 1919 – 5 December 2015) was a Scottish soldier who was awarded the Military Cross and the Distinguished Service Order during the Second World War. He later had a career in book publishing and printing and wrote a well-received account of his war-time experiences.

== Early life ==
James Aikman Cochrane was born in Glasgow on 12 May 1919, the only son of Margarita Cochrane and Major James Aikman Cochrane. Major Cochrane, who served with the Royal Scots Fusiliers and Royal Flying Corps in the First World War, won the Military Cross, and the Belgian Croix de Guerre avec Palme and Croix de Chevalier de l'Ordre de Leopolde. Peter had a younger sister Marigold. His mother decided that he should be known as "Peter" to differentiate him from his father and a cousin. He spent his early years at his father's posting in the Far East, and was later educated at Loretto School in Edinburgh. In 1938 he went up to Wadham College, Oxford University, where he read law but left to join the army before he could graduate.

== Second World War ==
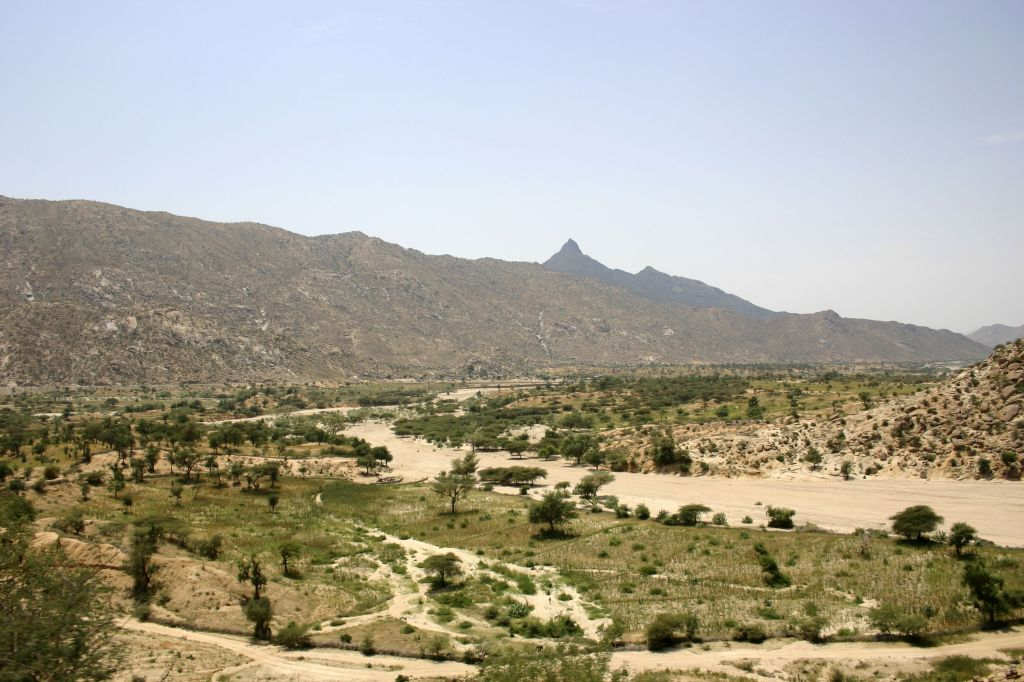
Keren in 2005.

Cochrane was commissioned into the Queen's Own Cameron Highlanders (QOCH) in February 1940 and joined the 2nd Battalion of the regiment in Egypt soon afterwards. On 22 October, during the start of the Western Desert Campaign, he and his men were ordered to test the strength of the enemy in a raid on an Italian position near Sidi Barrani. They found vehicles rather than the expected enemy fortifications, and destroying the vehicles, withdrew to base on board the last remaining one. Their interpreter was a Libyan prisoner conversant in Italian. As soon as they started their withdrawal, they were shelled and mortared by enemy positions with rifles. The Libyan driving the vehicle proceeded very slowly stuck in bottom gear, forcing them to abandon the lorry in a wadi. Cochrane ordered his men to disable the vehicle under heavy shelling and tracer rounds. On his return to Company HQ with his small group he was recommended for and received a Military Cross for "coolness, resource and initiative under fire beyond praise" in that action.

In early 1941, the battalion, part of Brigadier Reginald Savory's 11th Indian Infantry Brigade of Major-General Noel Beresford-Peirse's 4th Indian Infantry Division, was engaged in a push through Italian Eritrea to dislodge Mussolini's Italian forces from the country. They faced particularly stiff opposition during the advance on Keren, a strategic port located nearby on the Red Sea at Massawa. On 3 February 1941, Cochrane, still only a second lieutenant, commanded two platoons that succeeded in taking a piece of high ground, later known as "Cameron Ridge", that was required to direct forward artillery fire. The Commanding Officer (CO) of the other platoon had been wounded near the start of the action. In what The Glasgow Herald described as a "lone attack", Cochrane destroyed two Italian machine gun positions single-handedly with grenades, killing the 13 occupants. He then held the position against counter-attacks and bombardment by artillery and mortars until reinforcements arrived to capture the main peak. For a fortnight he remained in the theatre of war on the frontline with his men, encouraging and leading them under constant enemy fire. They dealt with the snipers and machine-gun posts before withdrawal. He was awarded an immediate Distinguished Service Order (DSO), awarded in person by General Sir Archibald Wavell, the Commander-in-Chief (C-in-C) of Middle East Command.

In March 1941, Cochrane was required to advance to higher ground behind Cameron Ridge. Under artillery and mortar fire, he reached the top with just three men, one of whom was immediately killed. All of the survivors were wounded by shell fire with Cochrane receiving injuries to his head, arm and both legs. He was captured and loaded onto a mule, falling off three times; and then taken to an Italian hospital in Asmara. The doctors brought the unwelcome news that he must choose amputation of both legs or surgery on the gangrenous parts. Without anaesthetic he had to undergo the terrible procedure. Asmara was liberated on 8 April when the 5th Indian Infantry Division took the city, unable to walk, he was again the object of a surgical operation, but this time by a British doctor. He was evacuated to Britain on a journey that took three months by ship. (Note: The Times version is that he was "sent to South Africa to recover".)

Later in August 1941, Cochrane, having regained the use of his legs, was sent on a lecture tour of 23 cities in the United States, which was then still neutral, with fellow officers Lieutenant Richard Miles of the Royal Navy (RN) and Flight Lieutenant David Scott-Malden of the Royal Air Force (RAF). In Washington DC he met his wife-to-be, Louise Booth Morley of the International Student Service (ISS) who was organising the visit. The Russians and their delegation included a Ukrainian sniper working for the Soviet Red Army behind German lines, Comrade Lyudmila Pavlichenko, a heroine of Joseph Stalin's Soviet Union. The British attended a reception at the White House hosted by the First Lady, then Eleanor Roosevelt.

Louise managed to obtain a job at the American embassy in London and the couple married at St Mark's Church, North Audley Street, in September 1943, then known as the American International Church. Louise became a noted BBC broadcaster and children's author. They had two daughters, Alison and Janet. Louise pre-deceased her husband in 2012.

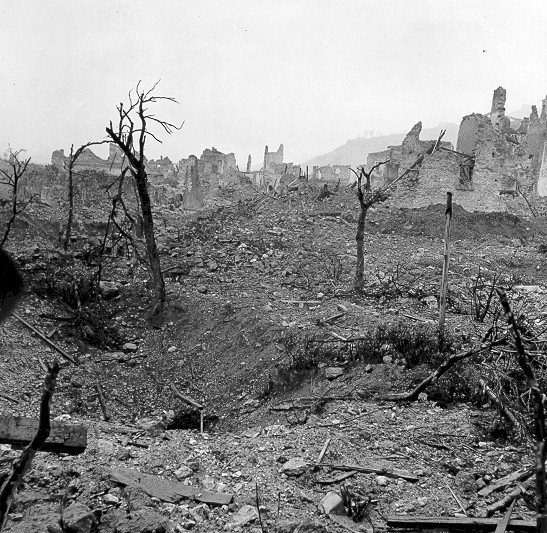
Aftermath of the Battle of Monte Cassino, 1944.

While Cochrane was away the 2nd Battalion, Cameron Highlanders, along with the rest of the 11th Indian Brigade, were captured at Tobruk in June 1942 during the disastrous Battle of Gazala. When the 4th Battalion, Cameron Highlanders, Territorial Army (TA) unit, was renumbered as the 2nd QOCH, Cochrane, now a major, was appointed CO of "C" or ("Charlie") Company. He sailed with the battalion for service in the Italian Campaign in early 1944. The battalion, which soon became part, once again, of the 11th Indian Brigade of the 4th Indian Division, now commanded by Major-General Francis Tuker, fought at Hill 593 during the Battle of Monte Cassino which he described as evidence that "war wasn't merely idiotic, it was wicked and cruel".

In January 1944, by now a battalion commander, he landed at Taranto in Italy and fought in the Fourth and final Battle of Monte Cassino, that drove the Germans out of that country. In early 1945 Cochrane attended the Staff College, Quetta. And from India he was posted as a General Staff Officer Grade 2 (GSO2) to the HQ of Allied Land Forces South East Asia (ALFSEA) at Calcutta. As the tide had turned and the enemy retreated he moved with command HQ first to Ceylon and then to Singapore, before returning to Britain.

== Post-war ==
Cochrane was demobilised in August 1946 before joining the publishers Chatto & Windus as a reader and to spot talent and eventually became a partner in the firm in 1949. He shared an office with the poet Cecil Day-Lewis, who had also attended Wadham College, and the two became firm friends. Day-Lewis dedicated some of his poems to Cochrane who also became Day-Lewis's literary executor on the poet's death in 1972. Cochrane took a course in printing and left Chatto in 1952, then to join the Somerset printers, Butler & Tanner, at first in London and then in their Head Office at Frome, where he worked until his retirement in 1979.

After his retirement, Cochrane and his wife moved to Edinburgh where he served on the literary committee of the Scottish Arts Council, and lectured on printing at Napier College. They spent the summer months on an owned croft in Argyllshire, enjoying fly-fishing, reading and editing of books. The reminiscences of his Army service were published by Chatto as Charlie company: In service with 'C' company, 2nd Queen's Own Cameron Highlanders, 1940–44 in 1977. The book was positively reviewed by Lawrence Cotterell in The Times for the way it described the human dimension of warfare.

Cochrane died in Edinburgh, on 5 December 2015. A lifelong Episcopalian, his funeral was held at the St Michael and All Saints Church in Edinburgh, part of the Scottish Episcopal Church.

== Selected publications ==
- Digest of British history. Newman Neame, London, 1954. (With Louise Cochrane)
- Dr. Johnson's printer. The life of William Strahan. Routledge & Kegan Paul, 1964.
- Charlie company: In service with 'C' company, 2nd Queen's Own Cameron Highlanders, 1940–44. Chatto & Windus, London, 1977. ISBN 0701122803
- Scottish military dress. Blandford, Poole, 1987. (Illustrated by Jeffrey Burn)
