= Black Guard (Brazil) =

Militia composed of former Brazilian slaves

- Guarda Negra
- Active: 1888 – 1889
- Country: Empire of Brazil
- Allegiance: Brazilian Imperial Family
- Type: Paramilitary group
- Role: Protect the well-being of the Brazilian Imperial Family and to ensure the Princess Imperial's accession to the throne

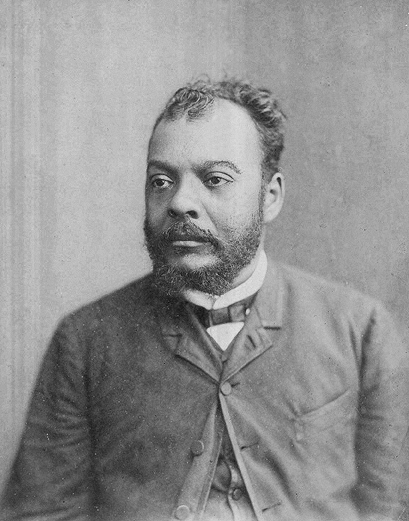
José do Patrocínio

The Black Guard of the Redemptress (Portuguese: Guarda Negra da Redentora) was a paramilitary secret society in Rio de Janeiro composed of Brazilian former African slaves freed on May 13, 1888, by the signature of the Golden Law by Isabel, Princess Imperial of Brazil.

The guard included capoeiristas who belonged to the street gangs of Rio de Janeiro.

The group was led by José do Patrocínio, a former republican, and its ostensible purpose was to protect the well-being of the Brazilian Imperial Family and to ensure the Princess Imperial's accession to the throne, in opposition to the rising threat of a republican coup. The group began its activities soon after the abolition of slavery and lasted until shortly around the Proclamation of the Republic in Brazil on November 15, 1889.

== Background ==
During the 1880s, Brazil continued to prosper and social diversity increased markedly, including the first organized push for women's rights. Although the Emperor, Pedro II, had two daughters, he had no son. Thus, there was no heir to the monarchy. Isabel, Princess Imperial of Brazil, did not see herself becoming monarch, and her husband was unpopular. Throughout the decade, movements advocating republicanism grew in membership, notably of slaveholders. The Golden Law was signed on May 13, 1888, by Isabel, Princess Imperial of Brazil, ending slavery in Brazil. The law was widely well-received. After its passage, Joaquim Nabuco wrote that "the monarchy is more popular than ever." Isabel became very popular among former slaves, known as 'the Redeemer of the blacks'.

== History ==
Soon after the signing of the law, the Black Guard was organized in Rio de Janeiro by a group called the "Inhabitants of the Moon". Dedicated to protecting Isabel, the guard was initially a secret society. The abolitionist José do Patrocínio is thought to have led the organization of the group; he also encouraged it to cooperate with white organizations. Largely a response to the increasing republican movement, the organization had over 600 members after six months and stood in direct opposition to the Republican Party of São Paulo. As a result, there were violent confrontations between members of the group and republicans. Members of the group supported Isabel and thought she would succeed Pedro. Historian Evaristo de Moraes wrote that "there was no way to contain that frenzy, unfolding in genuflection at the feet of the golden-haired mother of the slaves [Princess Isabel] and going so far as the creation of a Black Guard."

The first commander of the guard was Clarindo de Almeida, an employee of the Brazilian government. Opponents of the group argued that it was being used by João Alfredo Correia de Oliveira, the President of the Council of Ministers. Police generally ignored the Guard's activities. On December 23, 1888, members of the Guard interrupted a gathering of republicans in Rio who were listening to Silva Jardim speak. On December 30, the Black Guard threatened Jardim and José Lopes da Silva, who were planning a rally at Rio's French School. At the rally, 500 Blacks gathered outside before a fight broke out between two Blacks in the audience and the republicans. The ensuing conflict lasted for 30 minutes, as members of the Black Guard attempted to get into the building, until mounted police ended the fight. Jardim finished speaking, and as the republicans left the building, they were again attacked. A riot spread across the city and there were various skirmishes between opposing groups with one death.

In January 1889, there were rumors of a branch being organized in São Paulo and similar tactics were used in Espírito Santo. Throughout February, armed Blacks continued to disrupt and attack republicans, particularly Jardim who was touring to gain support for his movement. Local authorities requested that Jardim bring army troops when he visited their town. Three hundred blacks gathered to protest him in Angostura, and riots broke out at other places Jardim traveled. Although no evidence links the riots directly to the Black Guard, historian Michael R. Trochim states that such violence was "associated in the minds of many Brazilians with the Black Guard." There were fears the unrest would degenerate into widespread civil war. In July, the Black Guard was involved in further conflict with the republicans. By late 1889, racial violence had largely ended as republicans gained control in the Brazilian Army, and the Black Guard was effectively ended by the Proclamation of the Republic on November 15, 1889. Floriano Peixoto stated that the coup was motivated by a belief the Black Guard was about to launch an attack in Rio, and it was used as a justification by other army officers.

== Bibliography ==
- Longo, James McMurtry (2007-11-28). Isabel Orleans-Braganca: The Brazilian Princess Who Freed the Slaves. McFarland. ISBN 978-0-7864-3201-1.
- Miranda, Clícea Maria Augusto (2011). Memórias e Histórias da Guarda Negra: verso e reverso de uma combativa organização de libertos. São Paulo, Brazil.
- Carvalho, José Murilo de (2007). D. Pedro II: ser ou não ser (in Portuguese). São Paulo: Companhia das Letras. ISBN 978-85-359-0969-2.
- Kraay, Hendrik (2016-07-01). Afro-Brazilian Culture and Politics: Bahia, 1790s-1990s: Bahia, 1790s-1990s. Routledge. ISBN 978-1-315-50260-1.
- Andrews, George Reid (1992). "Black Political Protest in Sao Paulo, 1888-1988". Journal of Latin American Studies. 24 (1): 147–171. doi:10.1017/S0022216X00022987. ISSN 0022-216X. JSTOR 156675. S2CID 145793290.
- Daniel, G. Reginald (2010). Race and Multiraciality in Brazil and the United States: Converging Paths?. Penn State Press. pp. 56–59. ISBN 978-0-271-04554-2.
- Trochim, Michael R. (1988). "The Brazilian Black Guard: Racial Conflict in Post-Abolition Brazil". The Americas. 44 (3): 285–300. doi:10.2307/1006908. ISSN 0003-1615. JSTOR 1006908. S2CID 147543617.
- Rodriguez, Junius P. (2015-03-26). Encyclopedia of Emancipation and Abolition in the Transatlantic World. Routledge. p. 87. ISBN 978-1-317-47180-6.
- Barman, Roderick J. (1999). Citizen Emperor: Pedro II and the Making of Brazil, 1825–1891. Stanford: Stanford University Press. ISBN 978-0-8047-3510-0.
- Boehrer, George C. A. (1966). "The Brazilian Republican Revolution: Old and New Views". Luso-Brazilian Review. 3 (2): 43–57. ISSN 0024-7413. JSTOR 3512882.
- Capoeira, Nestor (2002). Capoeira: Roots of the Dance-Fight-Game. Blue Snake Books. ISBN 978-1-58394-637-4.
