= Laura Motta =

Brazilian nun candidate for sainthood

Sister Laura Motta
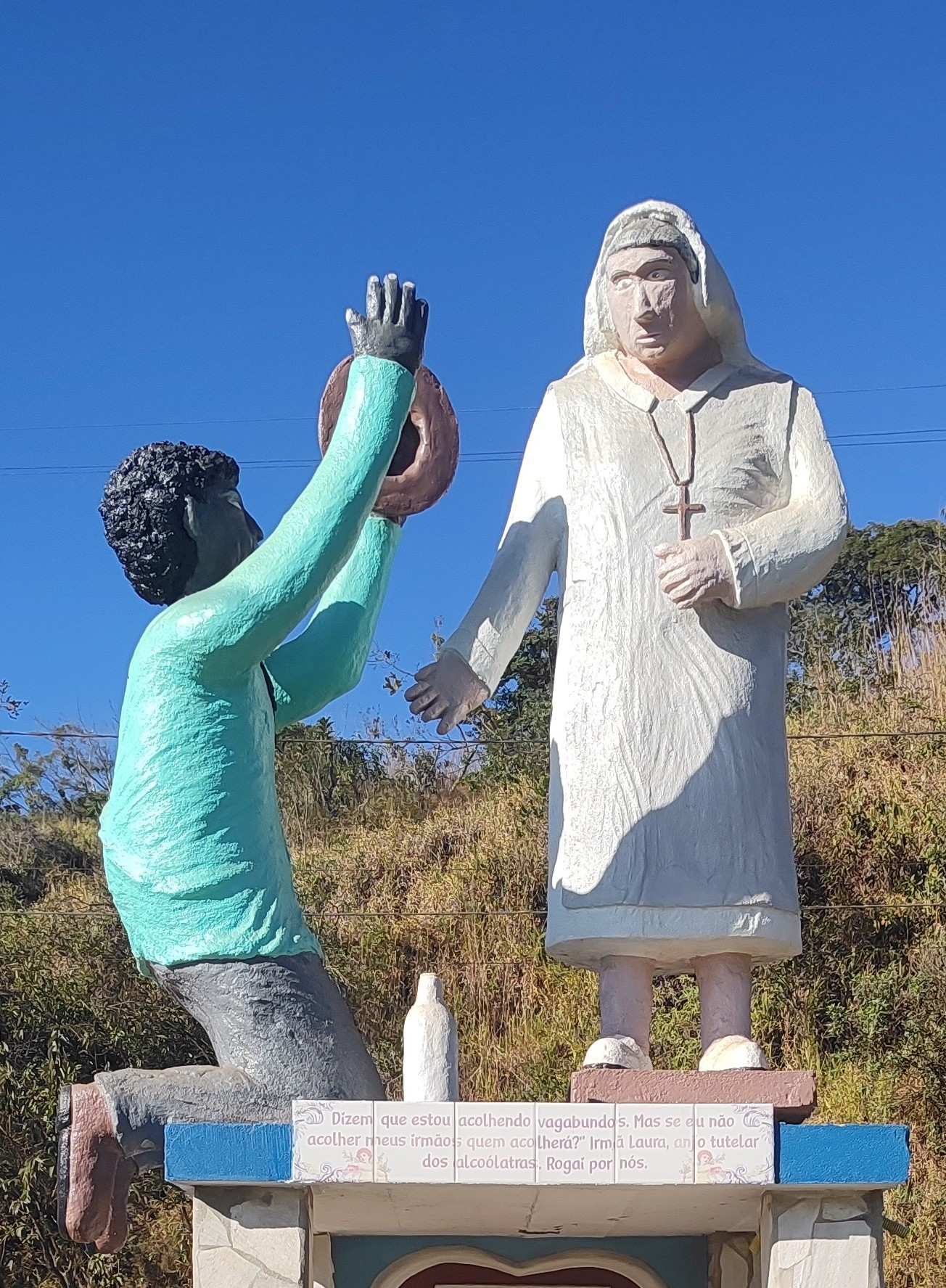

Personal details
- Born: 21 June 1919 Jardinópolis, São Paulo, Brazil
- Died: 13 February 2014 (aged 94) São Paulo, Brazil
- Buried: Cambuquira, Minas Gerais
- Denomination: Christianity (Catholicism)

Laura Motta (21 June 1919 – 13 February 2014), better known as "Irmã Laura", was a Brazilian catholic nun member of the Sisters of Saint Marcelina.

== Life ==
Born on June 21, 1919, in the city of Jardinópolis, in the Brazilian state of São Paulo, she was the daughter of Italian immigrants Luciano Motta and Brasilia Motta.

On January 1, 1942, at the age of 22, Laura entered religious life, having chosen the Congregation of the Sisters of Saint Marcelina to dedicate her service. She professed her perpetual vows on January 6, 1946.

Laura stood out for her work in the mining city of Cambuquira, where she had been sent in 1974. However, she had already exercised her ministry in other cities in Minas Gerais, such as Belo Horizonte and Muriaé. She also worked in the city of São Paulo on works belonging to his congregation, such as the school, the boarding school and the Santa Marcelina hospital.

During her religious ministry in the city of Cambuquira, Sister Laura showed solidarity with the families of people who had a member living in the vice of alcoholism. She then began to help with the recovery of these addicts. With his efforts he managed to bring the group Alcoholics Anonymous to the city. He also founded the "House of Fraternal Love", whose objective is to shelter homeless people and drug addicts. This new institution founded by her began its charitable work on May 1, 2005.

For children, she founded the "Clubinho Florzinha Feliz", which seeks to promote leisure and fun.

In the parish environment, she dedicated herself as a catechist and minister of the Eucharist, as well as in the development of the Catholic Charismatic Renewal.

Once, when they called her saint, she said: "I'm not a saint, but I want to be an intercessor for those who suffer from alcoholism".

Laura Motta died on February 13, 2014, at the age of 94, in the city of São Paulo. Her funeral was held at the parish church of Saint Sebastian, in Cambuquira, and, at the request of the population, she was also buried in the city.

== Beatification process ==
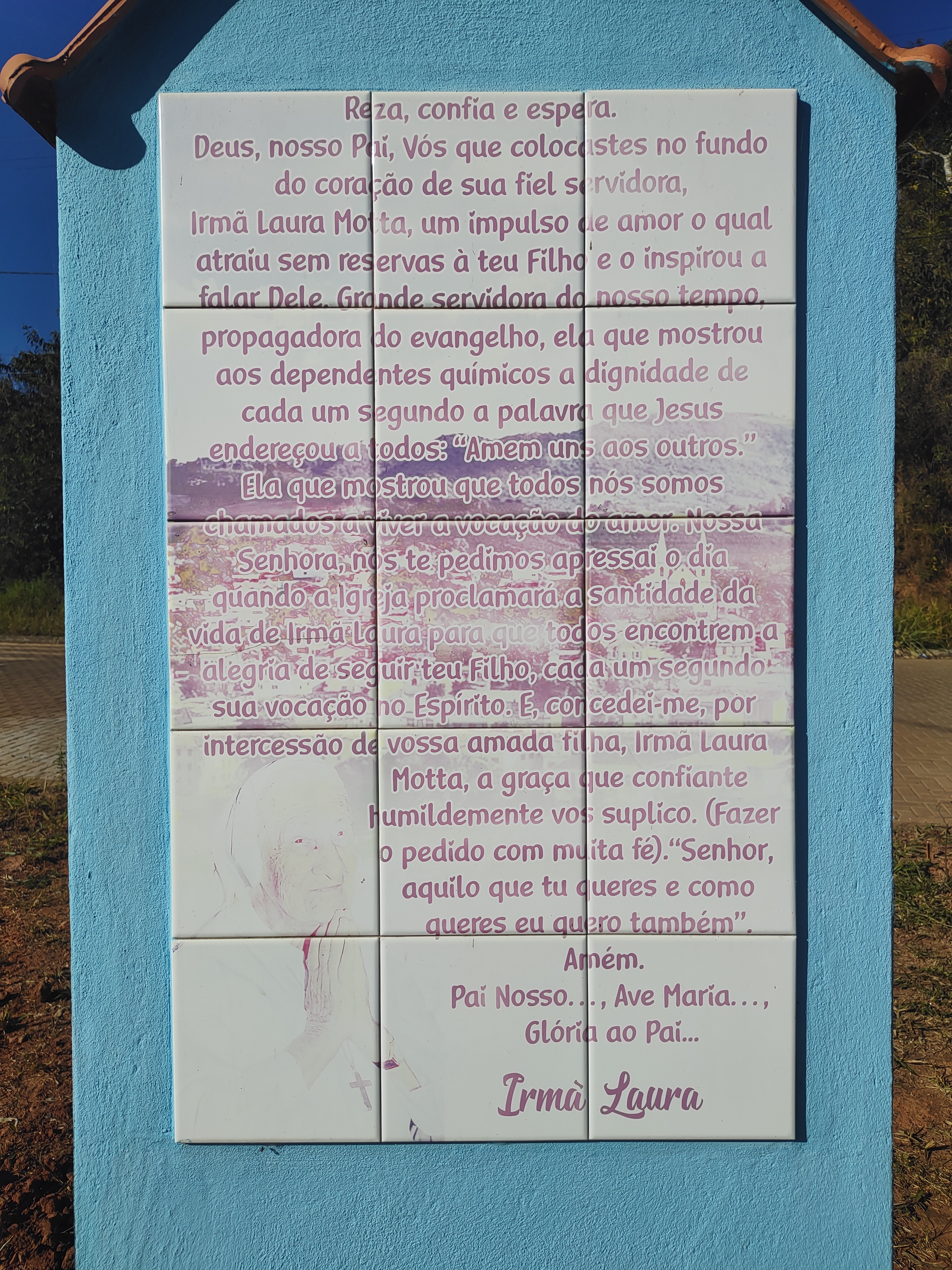
Prayer for beatification erected in a square in Cambuquira

Since her death, her tomb, which is located in the municipal cemetery of Cambuquira, has become the destination of pilgrimages. Her devotees attribute miracles to her and are collecting statements in support of her potential beatification. The Diocese of Campanha, which has jurisdiction over the parish community of Cambuquira, is studying the possibility of initiating the process.
