= Jardinópolis, São Paulo =

Jardinópolis
- Municipality
- The Municipality of Jardinópolis
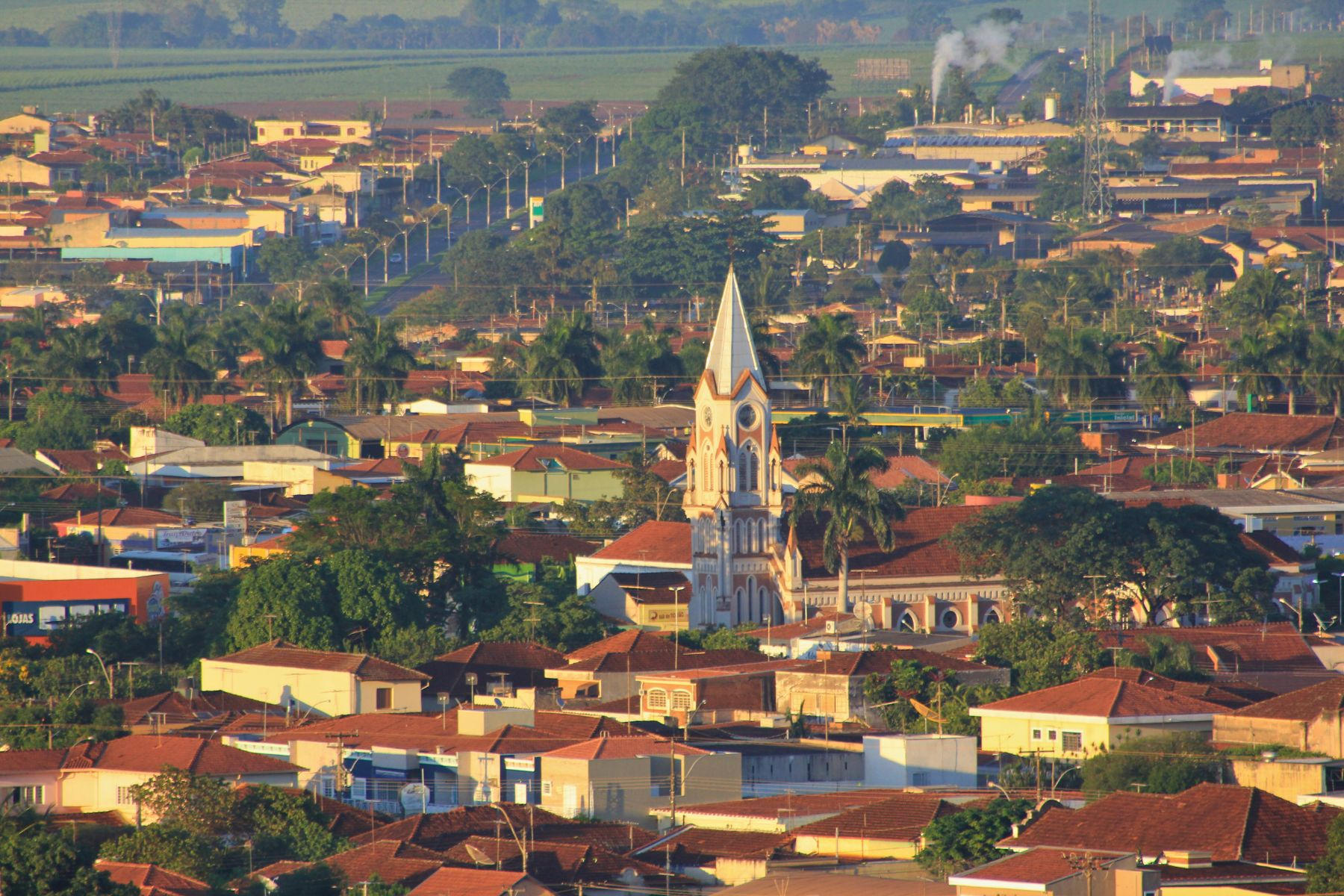

- Flag Coat of arms

- Location in São Paulo state

- Location in Brazil
- Coordinates: 21°1′4″S 47°45′50″W
- Country: Brazil
- Region: Southeast
- State: São Paulo

Area
  - Total: 502 km^{2} (194 sq mi)

Population (2022)
  - Total: 45,282
  - Density: 90.2/km^{2} (234/sq mi)
- Demonym: jardinopolense
- Time zone: UTC−3 (BRT)
- Postal code: 14680-000
- Area code: 16

Jardinópolis is a municipality in the state of São Paulo, Brazil, in the outskirts of Ribeirão Preto. The population is 45,282 (2022 est.) in an area of 502 km^{2}. It is 590 m above sea level. Jardinópolis is known as an important distribution center of mangoes in Brazil. The town hosts the "Festa do Senhor Bom Jesus da Lapa" (The Kind Hearted Jesus of Lapa's celebration) religious event, which takes place every year between July 28 and August 6.

== See also ==
- List of municipalities in São Paulo
- Laura Motta
- Antônio da Silva Jardim
- Interior of São Paulo
