= Henry Stephens =

Henry Stephens may refer to:

- Henry Stephens (agriculturalist) (1795–1874), Scottish farmer and writer
- Henry Stephens (doctor) (1796–1864), British doctor, inventor and ink entrepreneur
- Henry Stephens (Conservative politician) (1841–1918), ink manufacturer, philanthropist and British Member of Parliament for Hornsey & Finchley, 1887–1900
- Henry Stephens (lumberman) (1823–1886), lumberman, merchant and financier in Michigan
- Henry Douglas Stephens (1877–1952), Australian paediatric surgeon
- Henry Louis Stephens (1824–1882), American illustrator
- Henry Pottinger Stephens (1851–1903), English dramatist and journalist
- Henry Robert Stephens (1665–1723), Belgian Jesuit theologian
- Henry Sykes Stephens (1796-1878), British general and artist
- Henri Estienne (1528–1598), also known as Henry Stephens, Parisian printer
- H. Morse Stephens (1857–1919), historian

== See also ==
- Harry Stephens (disambiguation)
- Henry Stevens (disambiguation)
- Henry Stephen (disambiguation)
