= African Institution =

Early 19th century society formed to create a refuge for freed slaves in Sierra Leone

The African Institution was founded in 1807 after British abolitionists succeeded in ending the slave trade based in the United Kingdom. The Institution was formed to succeed where the former Sierra Leone Company had failed—to create a viable, civilised refuge for freed slaves in Sierra Leone, in West Africa. It was led by James Stephen and William Wilberforce. From 1823, its work was mostly taken over by the Society for the Mitigation and Gradual Abolition of Slavery Throughout the British Dominions, and it ceased to exist sometime between 1826 and 1828.

== History ==
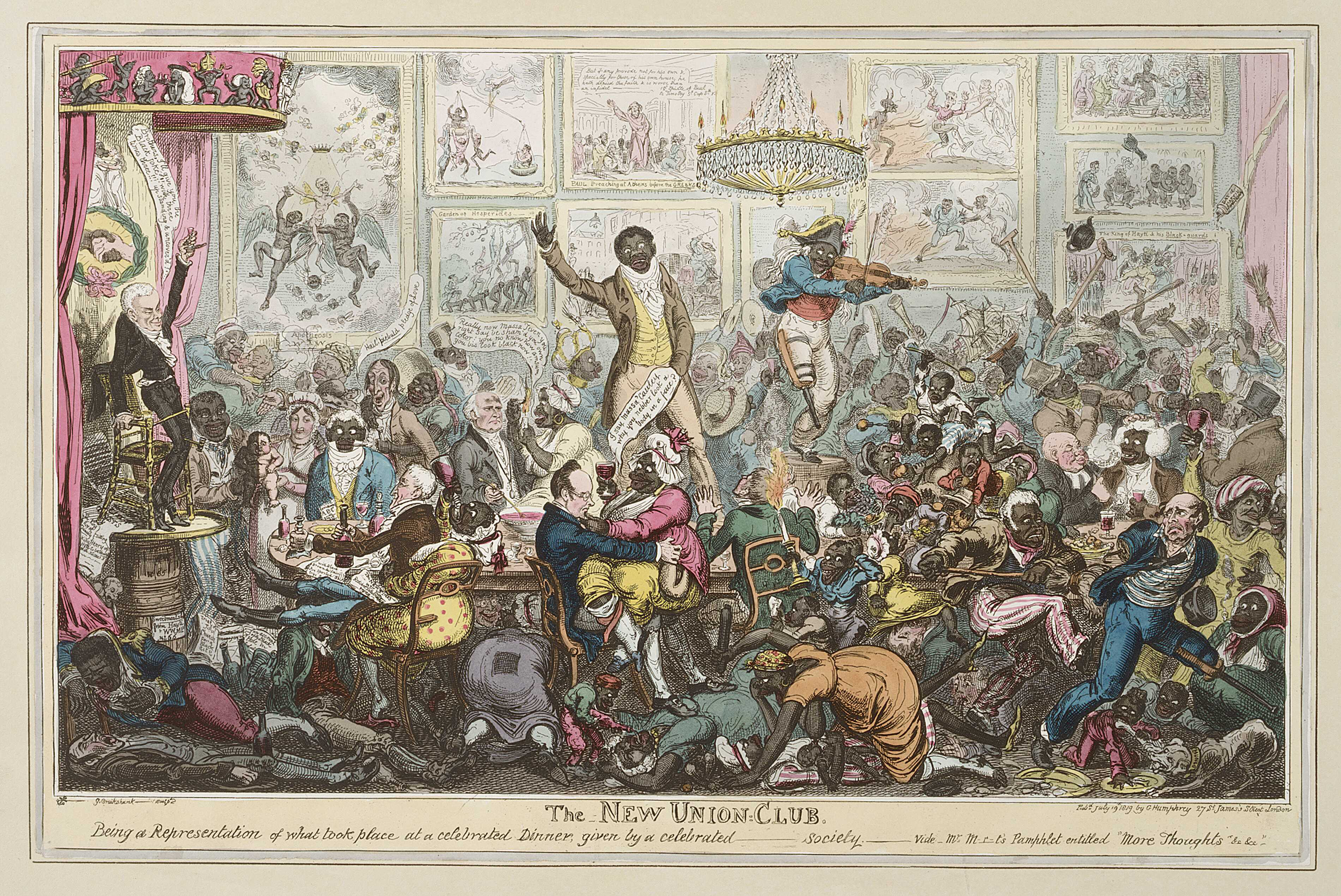
The New Union: Club, Being a Representation of what took place at a celebrated Dinner, given by a celebrated – society, a racist print of 1819 by George Cruikshank. It portrays a dinner at the African Institution, stereotyping the black people present. Billy Waters, a Black London street entertainer, amuses the crowds. White abolitionists William Wilberforce, George Stephen, Zachary Macaulay and Robert Wedderburn are present at the event.

Where the Sierra Leone Company sought first to convert the native population through evangelism, the African Institution aimed to improve the standard of living in Freetown first. Rules and regulations were proposed at its first meeting on 14 April 1807. One aspect of its purpose was to repair the wrongs which Africans had suffered in their intercourse with Europeans.

The leaders of the African Institution were James Stephen and William Wilberforce. The Duke of Gloucester, nephew of King George III, acted as the Institution's first president, and was joined by clergymen and aristocrats. Leading Quaker families also became supporters, as well as Unitarians like Peter Finch Martineau.

== Friendly Society of Sierra Leone ==
The Institution showed close interest in working with Paul Cuffe, an African-American entrepreneur. In 1810–11 they approached the British government, requesting a land grant in Sierra Leone for him.

The African merchants of Freetown, Sierra Leone, were however prevented from getting ahead by the tight monopoly which the British merchant company Macaulay and Babington held over the Sierra Leone trade. On 7 April 1811 Cuffe met with the foremost black merchants of the colony, including the successful John Kizell. They penned a petition to the African Institution, stating that the colony's greatest needs were for settlers to work in agriculture, commerce and whaling; and that these three areas would facilitate growth for the colony best. Upon receiving this petition, the members of the Institution agreed with their findings. Cuffe and these merchants together founded the Friendly Society of Sierra Leone, a local mutual-aid merchant group dedicated to furthering prosperity and industry among the free peoples in the colony and loosening the stranglehold that English merchants held on trade.

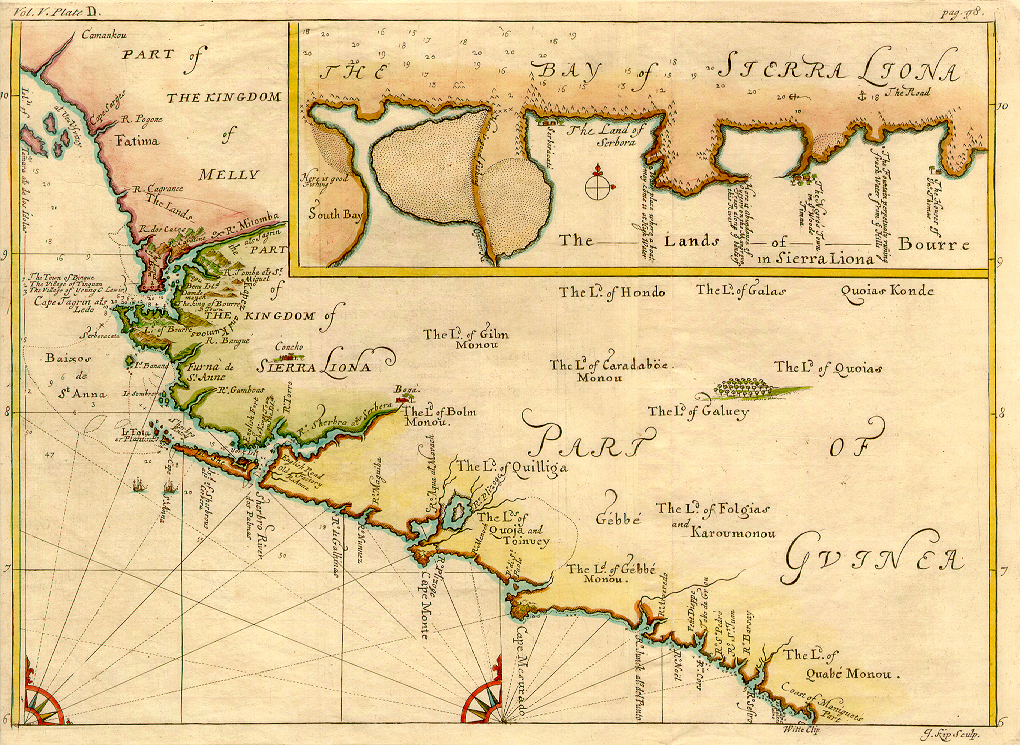
1732 map of Sierra Leone and the coast of Guinea

== Indian Ocean ==
The Institution took action in negotiating with Said bin Sultan, Sultan of Muscat and Oman to reduce the prevalence of slavery in his possessions, which included Zanzibar. This was in 1820, some five years after the East India Company had become involved with the Sultan, through the Governor of Bombay, Sir Evan Nepean. In 1821, Ralph Darling, who was Governor of Mauritius, also took steps against the slave trade.

== Reports ==
The Committee of the African Institution produced a series of annual Reports, from 1807 to 1824.

=== First Report (1807) ===
In its first report, presented on 15 July 1807, "The committee expressed its view that the people of Africa were sunk in ignorance and barbarism and took for itself the task of introducing the blessings of civilisation to what they viewed as constituting a quarter of the habitable globe.".

=== Second Report (1808) ===
The second report starts with the announcement of a series of prizes valued at 50 Guineas for the being the first person to import from West Africa to Great Britain the following quantities of goods:

One Ton of marketable Cotton
100 weight of Indigo
Ten Tons of White Rice

A further 50 Guinea prize was offered to the person who put the most land in West Africa under Coffee cultivation, as long as it was at least ten acres.

=== Third Report (1809) ===
In its third report, presented 25 March 1809, the directors reported that three African youths had received training in a new educational procedure developed at the Duke of York's Royal Military School from techniques developed in India. Thanks to the intervention of the Duke of Gloucester, the youths participated as teacher at the Asylum before being sent to Sierra Leone, where they were employed as teachers by the Secretary of State for War and the Colonies, the Earl of Liverpool. One of the skills it was hoped they would introduce to Sierra Leone was cotton cultivation.

=== Fourth Report (1810) ===
Fourth Report of the Committee of the African Institution, presented 28 March 1810:

The Directors expressed concern that British slave traders were continuing in their trade but escaping British laws by adopting Swedish and Spanish flags of convenience.

=== Fifth Report (1811) ===
Fifth Report of the Directors of the African Institution, presented 27 March 1811:

The directors with dismay reported the continuing activity of British and American ships continuing to pursue the slave trade using Portuguese and Spanish flags of convenience. They identified British capital and credit playing a large part in this considerable trade. Through Henry Brougham MP they initiated a discussion in the Houses of Parliament followed by the introduction of a bill to make it easier to prosecute British nationals using flags of convenience to avoid prosecution at the Vice-Admiralty courts set up in Sierra Leone.

=== Sixth Report (1812) ===
Sixth Report of the Committee of the African Institution, presented at the Freemasons' Tavern, London 25 March 1812:

The directors reported with concern that they had previously underestimated the growth in the slave trade providing an estimate of 70-80,000 enslaved Africans being transported across the Atlantic in 1810. They highlighted the role of the port of Bissau in this development.

=== Seventh Report (1813) ===
Seventh Report of the Committee of the African Institution, presented at the Freemasons' Tavern, London 24 March 1813:

The directors were pleased to report that there had been a decline in the slave trade and expressed their gratitude to the efforts of two naval officers: Commodore Frederick Paul Irby and Captain Edward Scobell

=== Eighth Report (1814) ===
Report of the Directors of the African Institution, presented 23 March 1814:

The directors reported on their concern with outstanding legal cases concerning the seizure of Portuguese ships engaged in the slave trade. They again commended Captain Irby of HMS Amelia and Captain Scobell of HMS Thais for their active involvement with suppressing the slave trade as part of the West Africa Squadron. They noted the action taken against a slave factory at Cape Mesurado

=== Ninth Report (1815) ===
Ninth Report of the Directors of the African Institution, presented London 12 April 1815:

The Directors expressed their delight with the sentiment expressed by the Congress of Vienna that the slave trade constituted "the desolation of Africa, the degradation of Europe and the afflicting scourge of humanity." However when this was not implemented immediately through the Treaty of Paris (1814), they expressed their disappointment. They pointed out that as there was no French Capital invested in the Slave trade, the delay of introducing a ban on the slave trade for five years amounted to an introduction of the slave trade to France.

=== Special Report, 1815 ===
A Special Report was produced in 1815 to rebut an attack on the Institution by Robert Thorpe. The seventh annual report had noted a deterioration of conditions in Sierra Leone, yet had made upbeat comments about all involved. Concerned parties—William Allen and John Clarkson—expressed disquiet, while Thorpe made unmeasured criticisms, pamphleteering and targeting Zachary Macaulay. Henry Brougham headed an internal enquiry at the beginning of 1814, with Wilberforce, Macaulay and Thomas Clarkson. The outcome was that Thomas Perronet Thompson, governor in Sierra Leone and at odds with leading evangelicals, who had already been removed in 1810, was roundly criticised.

=== Twelfth Report, 1818 ===
Twelfth Report of the Directors of the African Institution presented on 9 April 1818:

The Directors restated their fears that the activities of the West Africa Squadron in suppressing the slave trade might be severally constrained following the outbreak of peace. This, they confirmed had happened, recounting the judgement of William Scott concerning the French ship Le Lois. HMS Queen Charlotte had seized Le Lois and the Vice Admiralty Court at Sierra Leone had condemned the ship and her cargo. However, when the owners appealed to the High Court of Admiralty, Scott overturned the previous judgement saying that the way Le Lois had been stopped and boarded was illegal as "No nation can exercise a right of visitation and search on the common and unappropriated parts of the sea, save only on the belligerent claim." He accepted that this would constitute a serious impediment to the suppression of the slave trade, but argued that this should be remedied through international treaties rather than naval officers exceeding what they were permitted to do.

=== Sixteenth Report (1822) ===
Sixteenth Report of the Directors of the African Institution, presented 10 May 1822:

The report was delivered to a meeting of over 1,500 people. After a motion of thanks to the Directors, this meeting passed a motion that they would emplore the British government to ensure that the slave trade should be declared piracy by the "concurrent sentence of all nations".

== Anti-Slavery Society (1823) ==
The Society for the Mitigation and Gradual Abolition of Slavery Throughout the British Dominions, usually known as the "Anti-Slavery Society", was set up in 1823. Its leadership overlapped substantially with that of the African Institution. It involved James Cropper and Thomas Babington Macaulay, and was somewhat more open in approach.

== Dormancy and demise ==
The Twentieth Report (1826) of the Institution concentrated on being informative, rather than summarising activity or raising funds. Wilberforce had retired. By about 1828 such activism as came from the underlying group was in practice being run by the Anti-Slavery Society.
