= Henry Stephen =

Henry Stephen may refer to:

- Henry Stephen (chemist) (1889–1965), British chemist
- Henry Stephen (musician) (1944-2021), Venezuelan singer
- Henry John Stephen (1787–1864), English legal writer
- Sir Henry Stephen (judge) (1828–1920), Australian politician and judge

== See also ==
- Henry Stephens (disambiguation)
