= Harold Stephens =

Harold Stephens may refer to:

- Harold Stephens (author) (born 1926), American author
- Harold Montelle Stephens (1886–1955), United States federal judge
- Harold Stephens (American football) (born 1938), American football player

== See also ==
- Harold A. Stevens, judge
- Harry Stephens (disambiguation)
