= James Stephen (British politician) =

British lawyer and politician

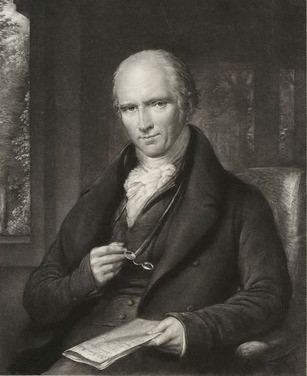

Member of Parliament for Tralee
- In office 1808–1812

Member of Parliament for East Grinstead
- In office 1812–1815

Personal details
- Born: 30 June 1758
- Died: 10 October 1832 (aged 74)
- Party: Tory

James Stephen (30 June 1758 – 10 October 1832) was the principal English lawyer associated with the movement for the abolition of slavery. Stephen was born in Poole, Dorset; the family home later being removed to Stoke Newington. He married twice and was the father of Sir James Stephen, grandfather of Sir James Fitzjames Stephen and Sir Leslie Stephen, and great-grandfather of Virginia Woolf and Vanessa Bell.

== Early life ==
James Stephen was born to James Stephen and Sibella Stephen (née Milner). He began his career reporting on parliamentary proceedings for the Morning Post. He was admitted to Lincoln's Inn in 1775 and was called to the bar there in 1782. His father had earlier been a member of the Middle Temple but was expelled before being called to the bar. James also read law at Marischal College, Aberdeen, for two years but ended his studies due to a lack of money. The following year he sailed with his family to the West Indies, where they would live for the next 11 years.

Stephen set up in practice as a lawyer there, becoming solicitor-general of St. Kitts, at that time a British colony. During a visit to Barbados, he witnessed the trial of four black slaves for murder. The trial, which found the men guilty as charged, was considered by many to be a grave miscarriage of justice. The men were sentenced to death by burning, and Stephens' revulsion at both the trial and the verdict led him to vow never to keep slaves himself, and to ally himself with the abolitionist movement. Stephen opposed the opening up of Trinidad through the use of slave labour when the island was ceded to the British in 1797, recommending instead that Crown land should only be granted for estates that supported the immigration of free Africans. He considered that, besides the evangelical arguments in support of freedom from slavery, internal security, particularly from potential French interests, could be obtained in the British West Indian islands by improving the conditions of slaves.

Stephen was a skilled lawyer whose speciality was the laws governing Great Britain's foreign trade. He was a defender of the mercantilist system of government-licensed controlled trade. In October 1805 – the same month that the British fleet under Lord Nelson defeated the French fleet – his book appeared: War in Disguise; or, the Frauds of the Neutral Flags. It called for the abolition of neutral nations' carrying trade, meaning America's carrying trade, between France's Caribbean islands and Europe, including Great Britain. Stephen's arguments two years later became the basis of Great Britain's Orders in Council, which placed restrictions on American vessels. The enforcement of this law by British warships eventually led to the War of 1812, even though the Orders were repealed in the same month that America declared war, unbeknown to the American Congress.

== Abolitionism ==
Stephen's second marriage was to Sarah, sister of William Wilberforce, in 1800, and through this connection he became frequently acquainted with many of the figures in the anti-slavery movement. Several of his friendships among the abolitionists were made in Clapham (home to the Clapham Sect) where he had moved from Sloane Square in 1797. Other connections were formed also in the village of Stoke Newington a few miles north of London, where Stephen's father leased a family home from 1774 onwards called Summerhouse. The property adjoined Fleetwood House and Abney House at Abney Park and stood where Summerhouse Road is built today. Close by were the residences of three prominent Quaker abolitionists: William Allen (1770–1843), Joseph Woods the elder, and Samuel Hoare Jr (1751–1825). The latter two were founder members of the predecessor body to the Committee for the Abolition of the Slave Trade.

Anna Letitia Barbauld, author of An Epistle to William Wilberforce (1791), also came to live in Stoke Newington in 1802. Inevitably, Wilberforce also became a frequent visitor to Stoke Newington, combining meetings with William Allen and his Quaker circle with visits to his sister Sarah and brother-in-law James.

Stephen came to be regarded as the chief architect of the Slave Trade Act 1807, providing Wilberforce with the legal mastermind he needed for its drafting. To close off loopholes pointed out by some critics, he became a Director of the Africa Institution for the Registration of Slaves through which he advocated a centralised registry, administered by the British government, which would furnish precise statistics on all slave births, deaths, and sale, so that "any unregistered black would be presumed free". Though he introduced many successful ideas to strengthen the legal success of the abolitionist cause, this mechanism which he believed to be "the only effective means to prevent British colonists from illicitly importing African slaves" was never taken up. His last public engagement was a speaking engagement at a meeting of the Anti-Slavery Society at Exeter Hall in 1832.

== Member of Parliament ==
From 1808 to 1815 James Stephen became an MP, firstly for Tralee and afterwards for East Grinstead and in 1811 Master in Chancery. His want of education and his fiery temper prevented him from doing justice to considerable natural powers of eloquence. In 1826 he issued An Address to the People and Electors of England, in which, echoing his speeches, he had some success in urging the election of members of parliament who would not be "tools of the West India interest", paving the way for the second Abolition Bill which succeeded in 1833.

== Family ==
Three sons from Stephen's first marriage, to Anna Stent at St Leonard's, Shoreditch in 1783, survived him, and achieved prominence in law, abolition and the civil service: Sir James Stephen (1789–1859), Henry John Stephen (1787–1864), and Sir George Stephen (1794–1879).

Stephen's second wife was Sarah Wilberforce (c. 1757–1816), eldest sister of William Wilberforce (1759–1833); Barbara Wilberforce (1799–1821) was her niece and daughter of William. In 1832 Stephen died, and all three were buried at St Mary's churchyard, Stoke Newington, London, along with Stephen's first wife, his mother and father and two of his infant daughters.

The Stephens were connected to the Australian legal dynasty of that name.

== Works ==
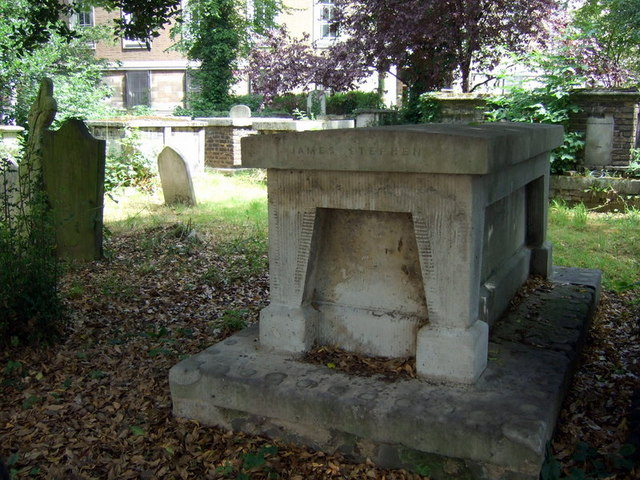
Grave of James Stephen, Stoke Newington

- The Crisis of the Sugar Colonies (1802)
- Buonaparte in the West Indies; : or, The history of Toussaint Louverture, the African hero (1803)
- The Opportunity or Reasons for an immediate alliance with St Domingo (1804)
- Wrote the History of Toussaint Louverture (1814) one of many few that is in English as a primary source. It was written to inform the Emperor of Russia (Alexander the 1) of the slave revolts going on in St. Domingo. Reasons for Establishing a Registry of Slaves (1815)
- A defence of the bill for the registration of slaves (1816) London: J. Butterworth & Son and J. Hatchard
- An Inquiry into the Right and Duty of Compelling Spain to Relinquish Her Slave Trade in Northern Africa (1816)
- The Slavery of the British West Indies Colonies Delineated. Vol. I. 1824.
- England Enslaved by Her Own Slave Colonies: An Address to the People and Electors of England (1826)
- The Slavery of the British West Indies Colonies Delineated Vol. II (1830)

Parliament of the United Kingdom
Preceded by Evan Foulkes	Member of Parliament for Tralee; 1808–1812	Succeeded by Henry Arthur Herbert
Preceded by Charles Rose Ellis; Nicholas Vansittart	Member of Parliament for East Grinstead; 1812–1815; With: George Gunning	Succeeded by Sir George Johnstone Hope; George Gunning
