= Amide reduction =

Organic reaction where amide is converted to Amine or Aldehyde

Amide reduction is a reaction in organic synthesis where an amide is reduced to either an amine or an aldehyde functional group.

== Catalytic hydrogenation ==
Catalytic hydrogenation can be used to reduce amides to amines; however, the process often requires high hydrogenation pressures and reaction temperatures to be effective (i.e. often requiring pressures above 197 atm and temperatures exceeding 200 °C). Selective catalysts for the reaction include copper chromite, rhenium trioxide and rhenium(VII) oxide or bimetallic catalyst.

== Amines from other hydride sources ==
Reducing agents able to effect this reaction include metal hydrides such as lithium aluminium hydride, or lithium borohydride in mixed solvents of tetrahydrofuran and methanol.

Iron catalysis by triiron dodecacarbonyl in combination with polymethylhydrosiloxane has been reported.

Lawesson's reagent converts amides to thioamides, which can also be converted into amines.

== Noncatalytic routes to aldehydes ==
Some amides can be reduced to aldehydes in the Sonn-Müller method, but most routes to aldehydes involve a well-chosen organometallic reductant.

Lithium aluminum hydride reduces an excess of N,N-disubstituted amides to an aldehyde:

R(CO)NRR' + LiAlH_{4} → RCHO + HNRR'

With further reduction the alcohol is obtained.

Schwartz's reagent reduces amides to aldehydes, and so does hydrosilylation with a suitable catalyst.
