= Stephen aldehyde synthesis =

Chemical reaction

Named after	Henry Stephen
Reaction type	Organic redox reaction

Stephen aldehyde synthesis, a named reaction in chemistry, was invented by Henry Stephen (OBE/MBE). This reaction involves the preparation of aldehydes (R-CHO) from nitriles (R-CN) using tin(II) chloride (SnCl_{2}), hydrochloric acid (HCl) and quenching the resulting iminium salt ([R-CH=NH_{2}]^{+}Cl^{−}) with water (H_{2}O). During the synthesis, ammonium chloride is also produced. It is a type of nucleophilic addition reaction.

Stephen aldehyde synthesis

== Mechanism ==
The following scheme shows the reaction mechanism:

Stephen aldehyde synthesis: Reaction mechanism

By addition of hydrogen chloride the used nitrile (1) reacts to its corresponding salt (2). It is believed that this salt is reduced by a single electron transfer by the tin(II) chloride (3a and 3b). The resulting salt (4) precipitates after some time as aldimine tin chloride (5). Hydrolysis of 5 produces a hemiaminal (6) from which an aldehyde (7) is formed.

Substitutes that increase the electron density promote the formation of the aldimine-tin chloride adduct. With electron withdrawing substituents, the formation of an amide chloride is facilitated. In the past, the reaction was carried out by precipitating the aldimine-tin chloride, washing it with ether and then hydrolyzing it. However, it has been found that this step is unnecessary and the aldimine tin chloride can be hydrolysed directly in the solution.

This reaction is more efficient when aromatic nitriles are used instead of aliphatic ones. However, even for some aromatic nitriles (e. g. 2-cyanobenzoic acid ethyl ester) the yield can be low.

== Sonn-Müller method ==
In the Sonn-Müller method the intermediate iminium salt is obtained from reaction of an amide with phosphorus pentachloride. Consequently it cannot be performed with acyclic enolizable amides, as the resulting imidoyl chloride is unstable to self-condensation.

== See also ==
- Amide reduction
- Nitrile reduction
- Pinner reaction – a similar reaction using alcohols or amines as the nucleophile and without the reduction; generated esters, carboximidates or orthoesters.
