= James Stephen (civil servant) =

British civil servant

Sir James Stephen KCB
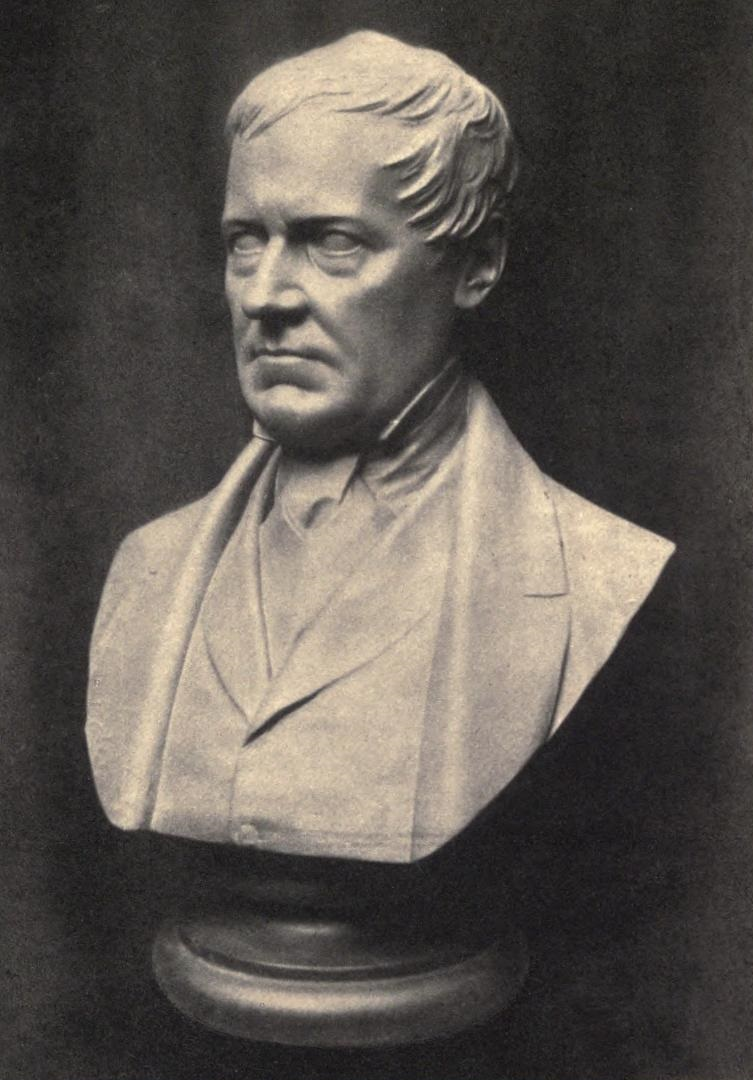
- Bust of Sir James Stephen, by Marochetti, now in the National Portrait Gallery, London
- Born: 3 January 1789; Lambeth, London, England
- Died: 14 September 1859 (aged 70); Koblenz, Prussia
- Burial place: Kensal Green Cemetery, London
- Employer: Colonial Office
- Notable work: Slavery Abolition Act 1833
- Spouse: Jane Catherine Venn
- Children: Herbert Venn Stephen (1822–1846); Frances Wilberforce Stephen (1824–1825); Sir James Fitzjames Stephen (1829–1894); Sir Leslie Stephen (1832–1904); Caroline Emelia Stephen (1834–1909)
- Parents: James Stephen (father); Anna Stent (mother)
- Relatives: George Stephen (brother); Henry John Stephen (brother); Albert Venn Dicey (nephew)

Sir James Stephen (3 January 1789 – 14 September 1859) was the British Under-Secretary of State for the Colonies from 1836 to 1847. He made an important contribution to the Slavery Abolition Act 1833.

== Early life ==
Stephen was born at Lambeth, the third son of James Stephen and brother to George Stephen (1794–1879). An attack of smallpox during James' infancy caused a permanent weakness of eyesight. He was under various schoolmasters, including John Prior Estlin and the Rev. Henry Jowett of Little Dunham, Norfolk. In 1806 he entered Trinity Hall, Cambridge, where he learnt as little as if he had passed the time "at the Clarendon Hotel in Bond Street." He took the LL.B. degree in 1812, having been called to the bar at Lincoln's Inn on 11 November 1811. His father, who was just leaving the bar, transferred some practice to his son, who also began to make a digest of colonial laws. Henry Bathurst, 3rd Earl Bathurst, who was in sympathy with the "Clapham Sect," allowed him to inspect official records for the digest, and in 1813 appointed him counsel to the Colonial Office. His duty was to report upon all acts of the colonial legislatures. The work increased, but he was also allowed to practice privately, and in a few years was making £3,000 a year, and in a fair way to the honours of the profession.

== Colonial Office career ==
On 22 December 1814 Stephen married Jane Catherine, who was the daughter of John Venn, rector of Clapham, one of the founders of the Church Missionary Society. In 1822 Stephen had a severe illness caused by exhaustion. He in 1825 accepted the office of Permanent Counsel to the Colonial Office and to the Board of Trade, and abandoned his private practice.

At the Colonial Office, Stephen was a protégé of the West Indies expert Colonel Thomas Moody ADC Kt. and a colleague of Moody's successor from 1828 Sir Henry Taylor.

In 1834 Stephen was appointed Assistant Undersecretary of State for the Colonies, and in 1836 Undersecretary, and gave up his office at the Board of Trade. He was esteemed for his knowledge of constitutional law, and as an administrator, and his colleague Sir Henry Taylor said that for many years Stephen 'literally ruled the colonial empire'. The impression of his influence gained him the nicknames of "King Stephen" and "Mr. Oversecretary Stephen".

Stephen had accepted his position partly with a hope of influencing policy on the slavery question. When abolition became inevitable, he was called on to draw up the Slavery Abolition Act passed in 1833. Between the noons of Saturday and Monday he dictated an elaborate bill of sixty-six sections. He also was writing for the Edinburgh Review, and suffered a breakdown.

In April 1837 one of the principal thoroughfares of Melbourne, Australia was named Stephen Street in his honour.

In later years Stephen was involved in the establishment of government in Canada; and his views are said to have been more liberal than those of the government. Esteemed by his official superiors, he used formality to keep others at a distance. The health of his youngest son induced him in 1840 to take a house at Brighton for his family, to which he could make only weekly visits. From 1842 to 1846 he lived at Windsor, in order to send his sons to Eton College. In 1846 he was summoned to Dresden by the illness of his eldest son, who died before his parents could reach him. In 1847 he resigned his post. He was made a K.C.B. and a Privy Councillor.

== Teaching and writing ==
Stephen had meanwhile become known as a writer by a series of articles in the Edinburgh Review, the first of which (on William Wilberforce) appeared in April 1838. They were written in the intervals of his official work, generally in the early morning. He carefully disavowed any pretence to profound research. The articles had, however, shown considerable historical knowledge as well as literary power. He had partly recovered strength, and was anxious for employment.

In June 1849 Stephen was appointed Regius Professor of Modern History at the University of Cambridge, a chair vacant by the death of William Smyth. He delivered a course of lectures on the history of France during the summers of 1850 and 1851, which were published in 1852, and praised by De Tocqueville. Another severe illness in the summer of 1850 had forced him to spend a winter abroad. From 1855 to 1857 he held a professorship at the East India Company College, Haileybury, which had been sentenced to extinction. He continued to lecture at Cambridge, but the history school then had little prestige. Keynes asserts in his biography of Malthus that Sir James Stephen was "the last holder" of Malthus's chair at Haileybury, which Malthus had held for thirty years until his death in 1834. Leslie Stephen "used to think nothing" of walking from Cambridge to visit his father at Haileybury.

== Retirement and death ==
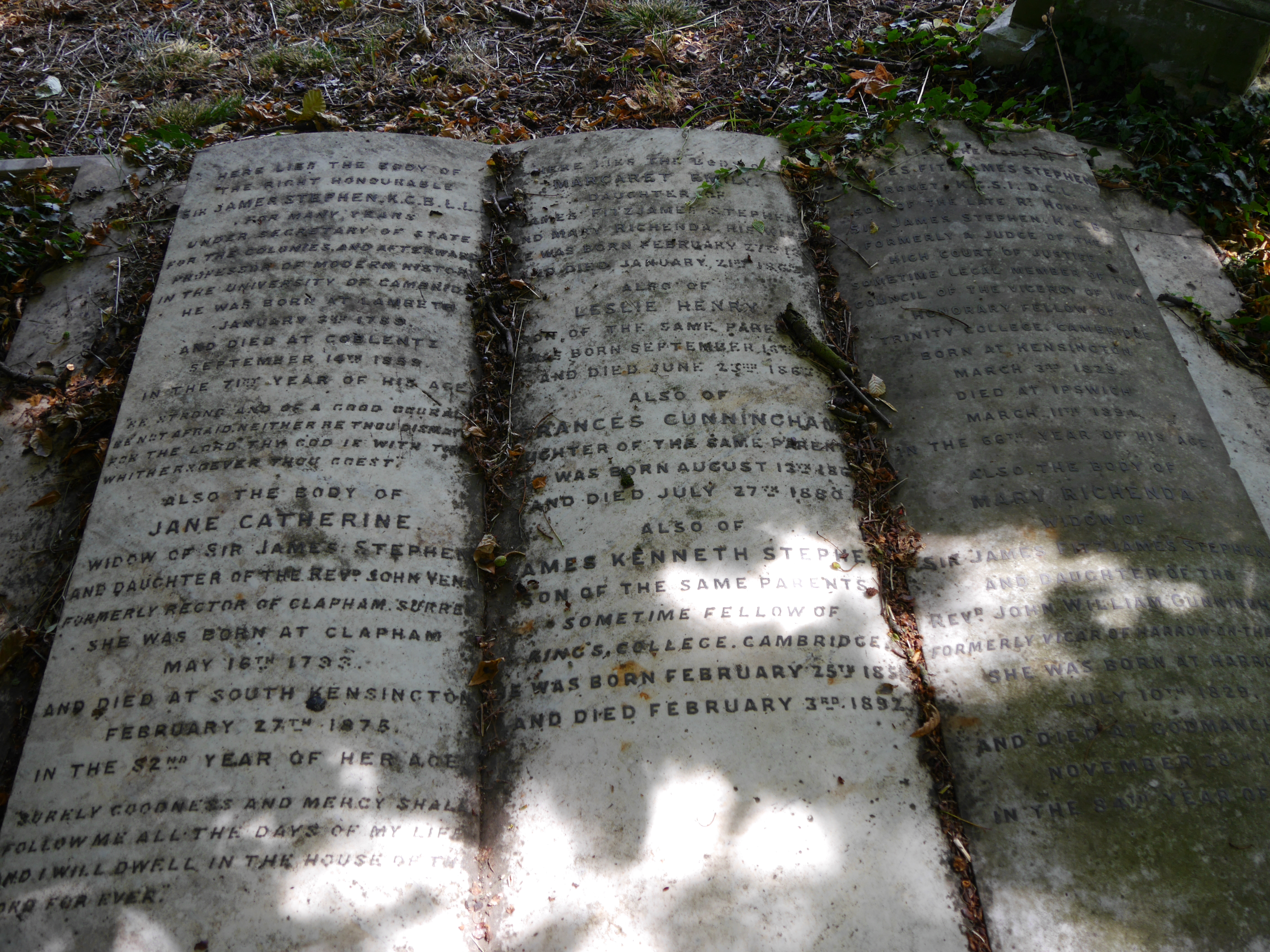
Monument, Kensal Green Cemetery

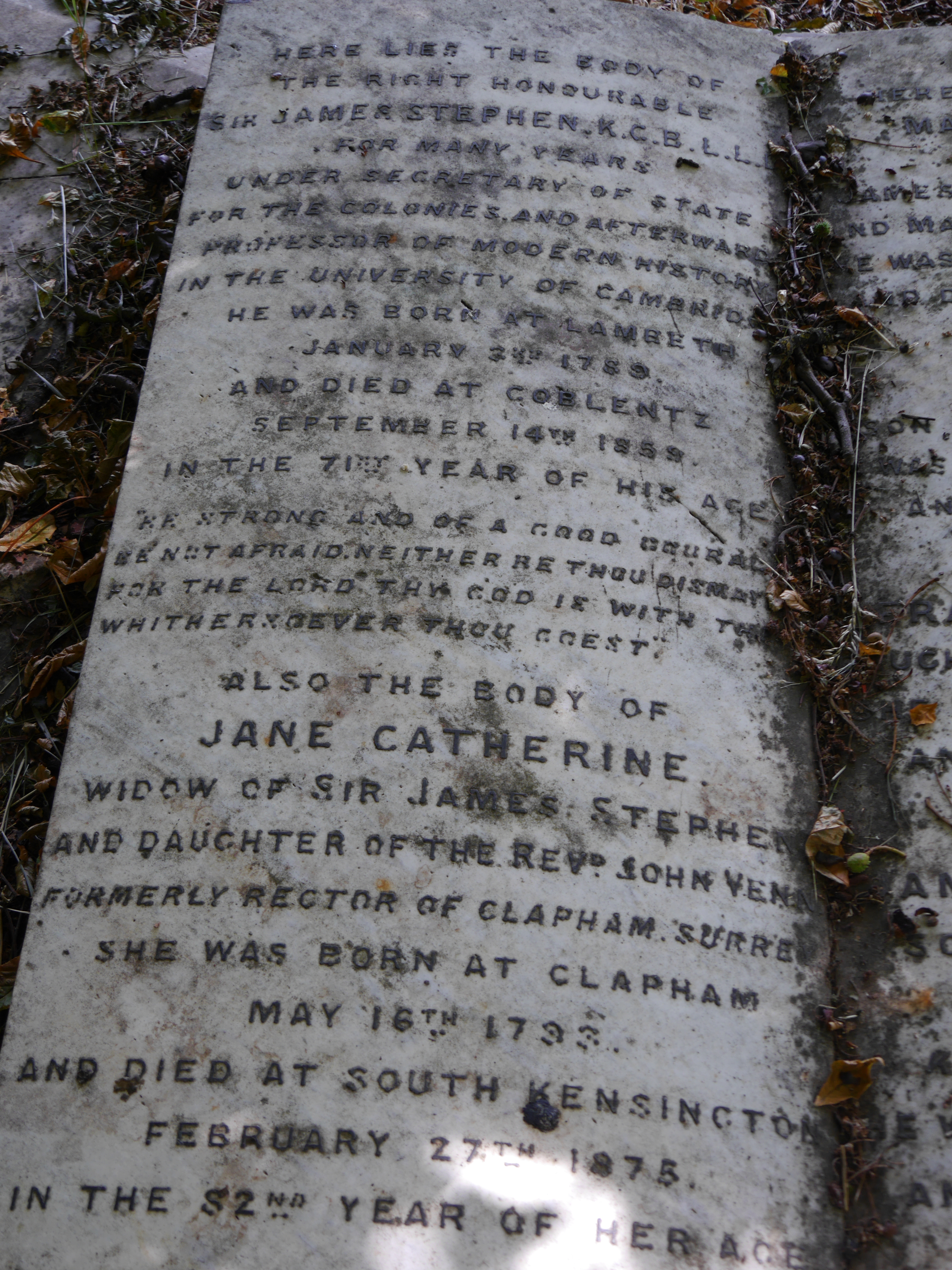
Monument detail, Kensal Green Cemetery

Stephen passed the last years of his life mainly in London. In 1859 his health showed serious symptoms, and he was ordered to Bad Homburg, Prussia. Becoming worse, he started homewards, but died at Koblenz, Prussia on 14 September 1859. He was buried at Kensal Green Cemetery, London. His widow died in 1875. They had five children:

- Herbert Venn Stephen (1822–1846)
- Frances Wilberforce Stephen (1824–1825)
- Sir James Fitzjames Stephen (1829–1894)
- Sir Leslie Stephen (1832–1904)
- Caroline Emelia Stephen (1834–1909)

There is a bust of him, by Marochetti, in the National Portrait Gallery, London.

== Works ==
- Essays in Ecclesiastical Biography, 1849; 5th edit. 1867 (with life, by his son, J. F. Stephen); reprinted Essays in Ecclesiastical Biography. Vol. 1. New York, Bombay, and Calcutta: Longmans, Green, and Co. 1907 – via Internet Archive.; volume 2
- Lectures on the History of France. Vol. 1. London: Longman, Brown, Green, and Longmans. 1851 – via Internet Archive. volume 2

Government offices
Preceded by Sir Robert Hay	Permanent Under-Secretary of State for the Colonies; 1836–1847	Succeeded by Herman Merivale
