= Brazilian Anti-Slavery Society =

Brazilian institution that fought against slavery

The Brazilian Anti-Slavery Society (Portuguese: Sociedade Brasileira contra a Escravidão, SBCE) was a Brazilian institution created by the engineer André Rebouças in partnership with statesman and writer Joaquim Nabuco, and lawyer and journalist José do Patrocínio. It was created on September 7, 1880, with the purpose of fighting against slavery in Brazil. Slavery was abolished in the country in 1888.

== History ==
Recognized by scholars as the first great Brazilian social movement, abolitionism in the country gained more strength by the end of the 1860s. Although the imperial family had been abolitionists since the country's independence, the power to make laws was not held by the Heads of State, but was shared between the Legislative and Judicial Branches, the latter two of which were in favor of maintaining the country's oligarchic and slave-owning structures. This made it possible for them to take turns in power from the second half of the 19th century onwards, without this generating major tensions. Abolitionist demands gained new impetus at the end of the 1870s, with the actions of D. Isabel and statesman Joaquim Nabuco (who in 1879 proposed a bill, rejected by the Legislative, for the gradual abolition of slavery, with a definitive abolition date of 1890) and with the extra-parliamentary work of the black engineer André Rebouças and the black journalist José do Patrocínio, who wrote for the newspaper Gazeta de Notícias. In 1879, the Sociedade Cearense Libertadora was also founded by João Cordeiro and José Correia do Amaral.

In 1880, in the wake of these mobilizations, André Rebouças brought together Patrocínio (also founder, in the same year, of the Central Abolitionist Association) and Nabuco to found the Brazilian Anti-Slavery Society, an institution that aimed to:

bring together references from different social classes around abolitionism, aiming for monarchical reform. The founding of the society itself, it is worth noting, followed a series of initiatives by certain sectors of the elites of the time, throughout the country: the maintenance of liberal clubs and associations aimed at defending abolitionism

—

The Society's Manifesto stated that:

This Society, for example, embraces everyone; it is open not only to statesmen who can understand the plan and details of a gigantic work of social renewal, but also to obscure men of the people who can only hate slavery as the instinct of free men.

—

The SBCE also published the newspaper O Abolicionista (named after an abolitionist newspaper in Spain, El Abolicionista), which was published from 1880 to 1881. The newspaper's demise was due to the decision to turn Patrocinio's Gazeta da Tarde newspaper into the national voice of the movement.

Through Nabuco, the SBCE sought to get closer to important abolitionist institutions in Europe, with the circulation and translation of its Manifesto into English, French and Spanish. The creation of the Brazilian institution was reported in the prestigious French periodical Revue des Deux Mondes and welcomed by the British Foreign and Anti-Slavery Society (BFASS). As sociologist Angela Alonso notes, the very name of the SBCE was a translation of the British institution, which inspired Nabuco's abolitionist militancy and which he had been in contact with since 1879.

In 1883, Patrocínio and Rebouças also led the process of founding the Abolitionist Confederation, an entity that aimed to bring together abolitionist associations from Rio de Janeiro and other provinces such as Espírito Santo, Rio Grande do Sul, Ceará and Pernambuco. The two were also authors of the Confederation's Manifesto. João Clapp, one of the founders and president of the Abolitionist Confederation, was also a founding member and secretary of the Brazilian Anti-Slavery Society.

== See also ==
- Abolitionism in Brazil
