= Harry Stephens =

Harry Stephens may refer to:

- Harry E. Stephens (1857–1939), member of the Wisconsin State Assembly from 1927 to 1931
- Harry J. Stephens (1866–1947), Australian journalist
- Harry Stephens (actor) (fl. 1950s–1980s) in Those She Left Behind
- Harry Stephens (Kansas politician) (1942–2020), member of the Kansas Senate from 1999 to 2001

== See also ==
- Harry Lushington Stephen (1860–1945), English judge
- Harold Stephens (disambiguation)
- Henry Stephens (disambiguation)
- Harry M. Stevens (1856–1934), English food concessionaire
- Harry Steevens (born 1945), Dutch cyclist
