= Henry Stevens =

Henry Stevens may refer to:

- Henry Stevens (bibliographer) (1819–1886), American bibliographer
- Henry Herbert Stevens (1878–1973), Canadian politician and businessman
- Henry Stevens (police officer) (1928–2018), British policeman awarded the George Cross
- Henry Isaac Stevens (1806–1873), British architect
- Henry Stevens (Australian politician) (1854–1935), member of the Queensland Legislative Assembly
- Henry Stevens (Wisconsin politician) (1818–1875), Wisconsin state senator
- Henry Bailey Stevens (1891–1976), American author, playwright and vegetarianism activist

== See also ==
- Harry M. Stevens (1856–1934), food concessionaire variously attributed as the inventor of the hot dog
- Henry Stephens (disambiguation)
- Henry Marshall Steven (1893–1969), Scottish forester
