= Society for Effecting the Abolition of the Slave Trade =

British slavery abolition organisation

- Society for Effecting the Abolition of the Slave Trade
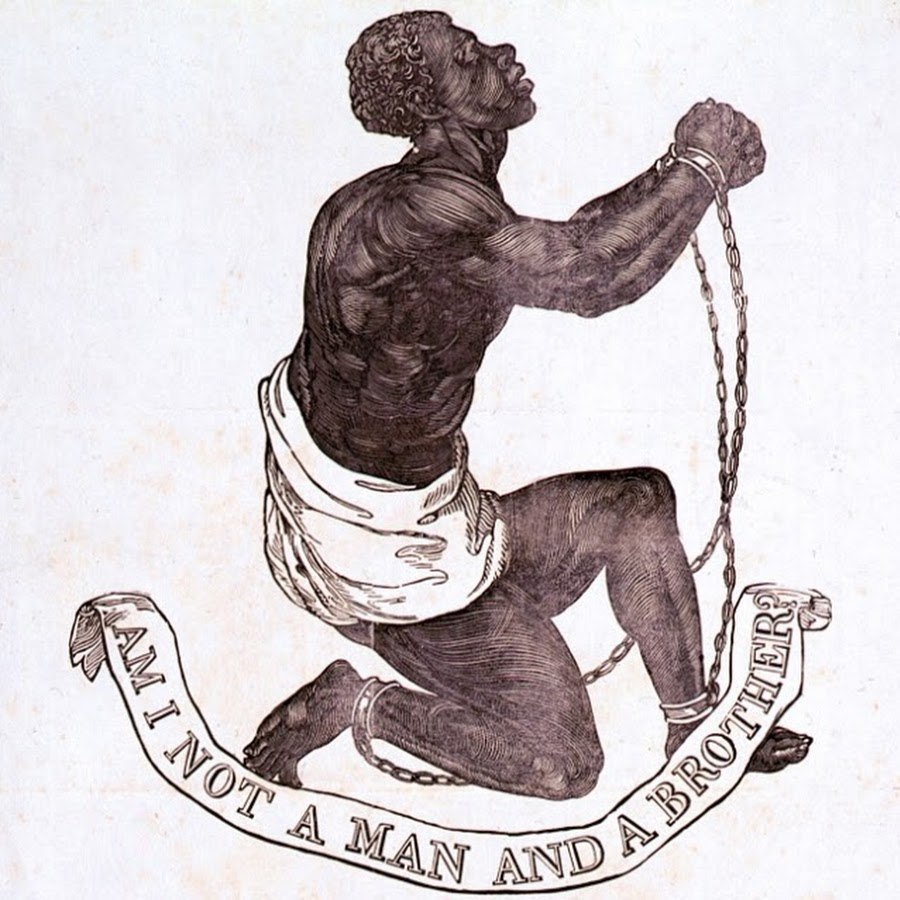
- Formation: May 22, 1787; 239 years ago
- Founder: 1. John Barton; 2. William Dillwyn; 3. George Harrison; 4. Samuel Hoare Jr; 5. Joseph Hooper; 6. John Lloyd; 7. Joseph Woods Sr; 8. James Phillips; 9. Richard Phillips; 10. Thomas Clarkson; 11. Granville Sharp; 12. Philip Sansom
- Dissolved: January 1, 1807; 219 years ago
- Headquarters: 2 George Yard
- Location: London, England
- Coordinates: 51.514240°N 0.111723°W
- Official language: English

The Society for Effecting the Abolition of the Slave Trade, also known as the Society for the Abolition of the Slave Trade, and sometimes referred to as the Abolition Society or Anti-Slavery Society, was a British abolitionist group formed on 22 May 1787. The objective of abolishing the slave trade was achieved in 1807. The abolition of slavery in all British colonies followed in 1833.

Adam Hochschild posits that this anti-slavery movement is the first peaceful social movement which all modern social movements are built upon.

A number of the founders had been meeting at George Yard since 1783, and over four years grew their circle of friends to include Thomas Clarkson, an unknown at that time.

The society was established by twelve men; including individuals who later became prominent campaigners, such as Thomas Clarkson and Granville Sharp. As Anglicans they were able to be more influential in Parliament than the more numerous Quaker founding members - given Nonconformists were not allowed to hold positions of power. The society worked to educate the public about the abuses of the slave trade and achieved the abolition of the international slave trade when the British Parliament passed the Slave Trade Act 1807, at which time the society ceased its activities. (The United States also prohibited the African slave trade the same year, to take effect in 1808.)

In 1823 the Society for the Mitigation and Gradual Abolition of Slavery Throughout the British Dominions (also known as the Anti-Slavery Society) was founded, which worked to abolish the institution of slavery throughout the British colonies. Abolition was passed by parliament in 1833 (except in India, where it was part of the indigenous culture); with emancipation completed by 1838.

It is a forgotten irony that Quakers and Nonconformists, who founded the Society, were denied equality until the Catholic Emancipation Act 1829, 22 years after the Slave Trade Act 1807 was passed.

== Historical background ==
Until the second half of the 18th century, the near-universal view of slavery was that it was an "unfortunate condition", something that nobody wanted to happen to themselves, but perfectly acceptable in other people. This thinking went back to its origins in prehistory. In the last quarter of the 18th century, there was a big swing in public opinion against slavery; 1.7 million people in Britain signed petitions seeking to abolish the slave trade. These ideas were held across the boundaries of social class. This U-turn in thinking in such a relatively short time may never be understood, but is suggested by David Eltis to be associated with a steadily less violent world and, in the English-speaking 18th century, an active and relatively free press, coupled with high literacy rates.

The first anti-slavery statement was written by Dutch and German Quakers, who met at Germantown, Pennsylvania in 1688. English Quakers began to express their official disapproval of the slave trade in 1727 and promote reforms. From the 1750s, a number of Quakers in Britain's American colonies also began to oppose slavery and called on English Quakers to take action with parliament. They encouraged their fellow citizens, including Quaker slave owners, to improve conditions for slaves, educate their slaves in Christianity, reading and writing, and gradually emancipate (free) them.

An informal group of six Quakers pioneered the British abolitionist movement in 1783 when the London Society of Friends' yearly meeting presented its petition against the slave trade to Parliament, signed by over 300 Quakers. They were also influenced by the publicity that year about the Zong massacre, as the shipowners were litigating a claim for insurance against losses due to more than 132 slaves having been killed on their ship.

== Foundation ==
The Quakers decided to form a small, committed, non-denominational group so as to gain greater Church of England and Parliamentary support. The new, non-denominational committee formed in 1787 had nine Quaker members and three Anglicans. As Quakers were not prepared to receive the sacrament of the Lord's Supper according to the rites of the Church of England, they were not permitted to serve as Members of Parliament, having Anglican members strengthened the committee's likelihood of influencing Parliament. The new society was named the Society for Effecting the Abolition of the Slave Trade, later often referred to simply as the Abolition Society.

The reverberations from what happened on this spot, on the late afternoon of 22 May 1787, eventually caught the attention of millions of people around the world, including the first and greatest student of what today we call civil society. The result of the series of events begun that afternoon in London, wrote French political philosopher Alexis de Tocqueville decades later, was "absolutely without precedent...If you pore over the histories of all peoples, I doubt that you will find anything more extraordinary". The building that once stood at 2 George Yard was a bookstore and printing shop. The proprietor was James Phillips, publisher and printer for Britain's small community of Quakers. On that May afternoon, after the pressmen and typesetters had gone home for the day, 12 men filed through his doors. They formed themselves into a committee with what seemed to their fellow Londoners a hopelessly idealistic and impractical aim: ending first the slave trade and then slavery itself in the most powerful empire on Earth." -- Los Angeles Times: The Idea That Brought Slavery to Its Knees.

=== Membership ===
Nine of the twelve founding members of the Society for Effecting the Abolition of the Slave Trade, or The Society for the Abolition of the Slave Trade, were Quakers:

1. John Barton (1755–1789);
2. William Dillwyn (1743–1824);
3. George Harrison (1747–1827);
4. Samuel Hoare Jr (1751–1825);
5. Joseph Hooper (1732–1789);
6. John Lloyd;
7. Joseph Woods Sr (1738–1812);
8. James Phillips (1745–1799); and
9. Richard Phillips

Five of the Quakers had been amongst the informal group of six Quakers who had pioneered the movement in 1783, when the first petition against the slave trade was presented to Parliament.

Three Anglicans were founding members:

1. Thomas Clarkson, campaigner and author of an influential essay against the slave trade;
2. Granville Sharp (Lawyer - had long been involved in the support and prosecution of cases on behalf of enslaved Africans); and
3. Philip Sansom

== Mission and activities ==
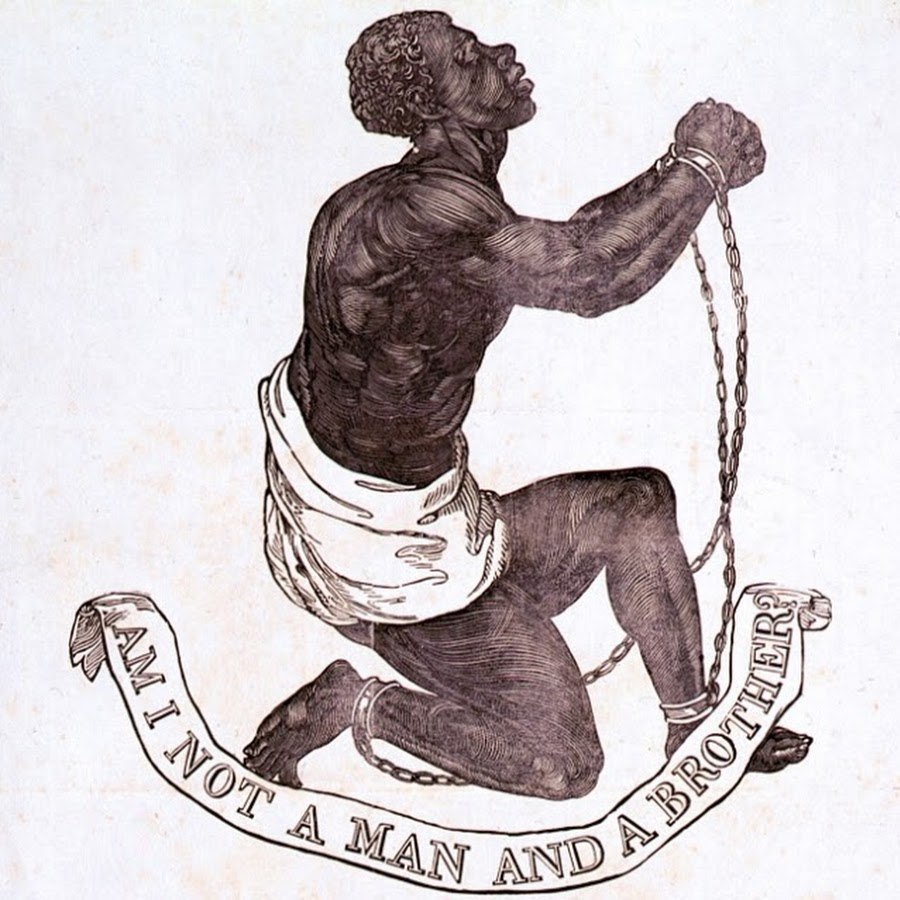
"Am I Not A Man And A Brother?" medallion created as part of the anti-slavery campaign by Josiah Wedgwood, 1787

The society did not aim at ending slavery altogether, but only to abolish British involvement in the international slave trade. They would do this by awareness-raising campaigns highlighting some of the cruel practices involved in the trade.

The mission of the Society for the Abolition of the Slave Trade was to inform the public of the inhuman and immoral treatment of enslaved Africans committed in the name of slavery, to campaign in favour of a new law to abolish the slave trade and enforce this throughout the British Empire. The society's methods for pursuing its goals included writing and publishing anti-slavery books, abolitionist prints, posters and pamphlets, and organising lecture tours in the towns and cities of England. Clarkson's Essay on the Impolicy of the African Slave Trade, published in 1788, was one of the first books on the subject.

Petitions were presented to the House of Commons (over 100 in 1788), anti-slavery rallies held, and a range of anti-slavery medallions, crockery and bronze figurines were made, notably with the support of the Unitarian potter Josiah Wedgwood whose production of pottery medallions featuring a slave in chains with the simple but effective question: "Am I not a man and a brother?" was very effective in bringing public attention to abolition. The Wedgwood medallion was the most famous image of a black person in all of 18th-century art. Clarkson wrote; "ladies wore them in bracelets, and others had them fitted up in an ornamental manner as pins for their hair. At length the taste for wearing them became general, and thus fashion, which usually confines itself to worthless things, was seen for once in the honourable office of promoting the cause of justice, humanity and freedom".

By educating the public, the Committee for the Abolition of the Slave Trade gained many members. In 1787, Clarkson's speaking tour of the great ports and cities of England raised public interest. Publication of the African Olaudah Equiano's autobiography heightened public awareness, as the former slave expressed an unanswerable case against slavery in a work of literary merit. In 1789 Clarkson's promoted the committee's cause by encouraging the sale of Equiano's memoir and inviting the former slave to lecture in British ports linked to the slave trade.

William Wilberforce introduced the first Bill to abolish the slave trade in 1791, which was defeated by 163 votes to 88. As Wilberforce continued to bring the issue of the slave trade before Parliament, Clarkson and others on the Committee travelled, raised funds, lobbied, and wrote anti-slavery works. They conducted a protracted parliamentary campaign, during which Wilberforce introduced a motion in favour of abolition almost every year.

== Membership ==
The committee was later joined by the Quaker philanthropist William Allen, who worked closely with Wilberforce and with his fellow Quaker members, and Wilberforce's fellow members of the Clapham Sect were subscribers to the society as well. Director of the Bank of England and founding member of the Philanthropic Society in St. George's Fields Jeremiah Harman was also a prominent supporter and subscriber of the initial publication of the Society.

=== Female membership ===
According to Claire Midgley (2004), the proportion of female subscribers to the society was typical of philanthropic societies of the time. Across the whole society, female subscribers comprised about 10 per cent of the membership, while in some centres, notably Manchester (with 68 women, or nearly a quarter of the total), the percentage was higher. Some of the most identifiable women were members of leading Quaker families, such as the wife of William Dillwyn, Sarah; others were members of the Clapham Sect and also members of the African Institution, and others were members of wealthy Unitarian families in Manchester. By 1788 there were 206 female subscribers. One prominent female subscriber was writer and polymath Elizabeth Carter.

== Related societies ==
Several members of the society also subscribed to the African Institution (founded 1807 to create a viable, civilised refuge for freed slaves in Sierra Leone). The Sons of Africa abolitionist society had a membership of educated Londoners, mostly African former slaves. It was closely connected to the Society for Effecting the Abolition of the Slave Trade.

Petitioning peaked in 1792, with up to 100,000 signatures (Manchester alone contributed 10,639), and regional anti-slavery groups started taking the lead, especially in the north of England.

Women had increasingly played a larger role in the anti-slavery movement but could not take a direct role in Parliament. They sometimes formed their own anti-slavery societies. Many women were horrified that, under slavery, women and children were taken away from their families. In 1824, Elizabeth Heyrick published a pamphlet titled Immediate not Gradual Abolition, in which she urged the immediate emancipation of slaves in the British colonies.

Despite the little influence they carried, many female abolitionists made a big impact on the abolition of the slave trade. An important campaigner was Anne Knight. She was born into a Quaker family in Essex and took active roles in the anti-slavery campaigns. Knight formed the Chelmsford Female Anti-Slavery Society. She also toured France, giving lectures on the immorality of slavery.

The Birmingham Ladies Society for the Relief of Negro Slaves was founded in Birmingham, England, on 8 April 1825.

== 1807 abolition ==
In 1807, the British Parliament voted to abolish the international slave trade under the Abolition of the Slave Trade Act, and enforce this through its maritime power, the Royal Navy. The society wound up its work after the Act was passed.

The United States also prohibited the African slave trade in the same year, taking effect on 1 January 1808.

In 1808 a separate Act was passed in the UK to give greater British protection to Freetown in West Africa (now the capital of Sierra Leone), a colony established in 1788 for the resettlement of former slaves and Poor Blacks from London, as well as Black Loyalists who had initially been relocated to Nova Scotia following the American Revolutionary War. The Timni chief Nembana sold a strip of land to a British official to establish this colony for freed slaves. When the Royal Navy later intercepted illegal slave trading ships, its crews frequently resettled the liberated Africans at Freetown.

== New society ==
From 1823, the Society for the Mitigation and Gradual Abolition of Slavery Throughout the British Dominions (also known as the Anti-Slavery Society) became the primary organised group working for legislation to abolish slavery. The Society and supporters, including captive and freed Africans, missionaries and evangelical movements in the colonies, worked to achieve the first stage of legal emancipation in the colonies. It also supported abolitionists in the United States. Many British supported lecture tours by American abolitionists in Britain who were raising funds for efforts in the United States. Such supporters sometimes provided refuge to Americans who had escaped from slavery and helped raise money to buy their freedom, as for Frederick Douglass.

== See also ==
- Abolitionism in the United Kingdom
- Bury the Chains: Prophets and Rebels in the Fight to Free an Empire's Slaves
- List of Abolitionist Forerunners (Thomas Clarkson)
- Testonites
