= Henry John Stephen =

English legal writer and serjeant-at-law

Henry John Stephen (1787–1864) was an English legal writer and serjeant-at-law.

== Life ==
Born on St Kitts in the West Indies on 18 January 1787, he was the second son of James Stephen (1758–1832); James Stephen (1789–1859) and George Stephen were his brothers. He was a student at St John's College, Cambridge, but did not graduate.

Stephen was called to the bar on 24 November 1815. Nervous and shy, though an accomplished lawyer, he was not successful as a barrister, but became known as a legal writer. He was promoted as a serjeant-at-law in 1828, and was a member of the common-law commission appointed that year.

In 1842 Stephen was on a commission on forgery of exchequer bills, and in the same year became commissioner of bankruptcy at Bristol, with Matthew Davenport Hill as his colleague. He lived at Cleevewood, near Bristol, till his retirement from this post in 1854, and afterwards lived at Clifton. In later years he was reclusive, involved in speculating on prophecy and musical theory.

Stephen died on 28 November 1864.

== Works ==
Stephen's works were:

- A Treatise on the Principles of Pleading in Civil Actions: comprising a Summary of the whole Proceedings in a Suit of Law, 1824, 1827, 1834, 1838, 1843, 1860 (by J. Stephen and F. F. Pender); and 1866 (by F. F. Pender); eight American editions from 1824 to 1859. Considered lucid by Albert Venn Dicey.
- Summary of the Criminal Law, 1834; translated as Handbuch des englischen Strafrechts, by E. Mühry, 1843.
- New Commentaries on the Laws of England (based on William Blackstone's commentaries), 1841–5, 4 vols.; later editions, edited by his son, James Stephen, and his grandson, H. St. James Stephen; the tenth appeared in 1895. The book was reprinted in America in 1843–1846.

== Family ==
Stephen in 1814 married his cousin, Mary Nuccoll Morrison. After his stepmother's death, from 1815 till 1832, he kept house for his father in Kensington Gore.

Stephen's wife and a daughter died before him; he left two children:

- Sarah Wilberforce Stephen, born 28 June 1816, was author of a religious story Anna; or the Daughter at Home, which went through several editions, and was one of the founders of the Metropolitan Association for befriending Young Servants. She died, aged 79, on 5 January 1895, Hastings.
- James, born 16 September 1820, was recorder of Poole, professor of law at King's College, London, and then judge of the county court at Lincoln. He edited later editions of the Commentaries and their Questions for Law Students. He died 25 November 1894.

== Notes ==
Attribution

This article incorporates text from a publication now in the public domain: Lee, Sidney, ed. (1898). "Stephen, Henry John". Dictionary of National Biography. Vol. 54. London: Smith, Elder & Co.
