= Henry Stephen (chemist) =

English chemist

Henry Stephen OBE, DSc
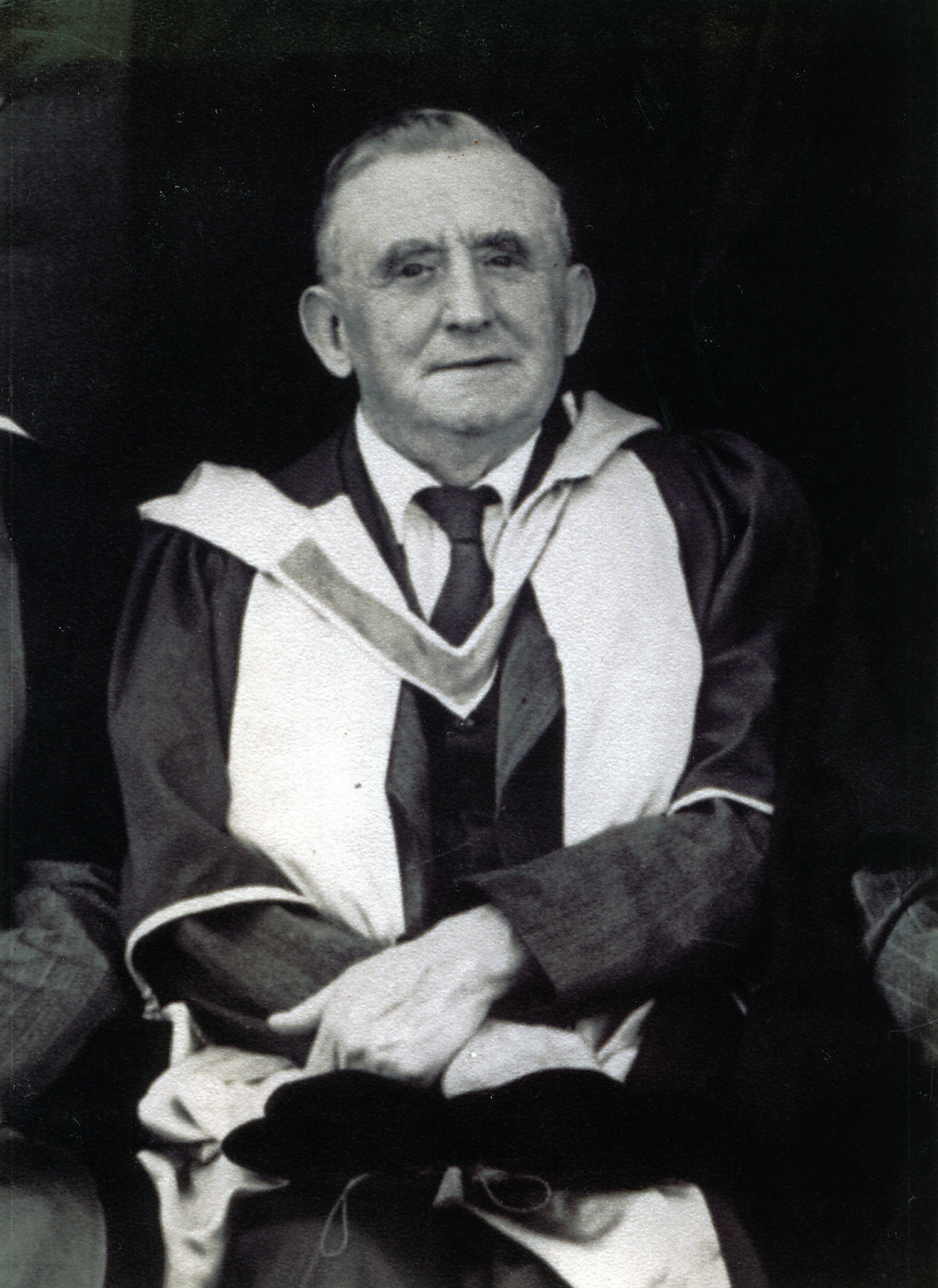
- Henry Stephen
- Born: Leonard Henry Nelson Stephen; 10 July 1889; Manchester
- Died: 6 July 1965 (aged 75); Oxford
- Spouses: Edith Heywood; Theodora Elizabeth De Kiewiet (Dora)

Henry Stephen OBE, DSc. (10 July 1889 – 6 July 1965) was an English chemist known for inventing the Stephen Reaction, a method of deriving aldehydes (R-CHO) from nitriles (R-CN).

== Career ==
Leonard Henry Nelson Stephen, later known as Henry Stephen, was born at 11 Dalton Terrace, Manchester, son of John Stephen, printer, and Mary Eliza (née Owen).

He studied chemistry under Dr Chaim Weizmann at Victoria University of Manchester. Along with Dr. J. E. Myers, Stephen contributed to the British World War I effort by developing a process to make mustard gas that was more rapid than the process being used by the Germans. In 1920, both received the OBE award for their work. He received his DSc degree from Victoria University of Manchester in 1920 and continued on as a senior lecturer. Dr. HENRY STEPHEN, O.B.E., Senior Lecturer in Chemistry in the Victoria University of Manchester; was elected to Ordinary Membership of the Society General Meeting, 19 October 1920. In 1925 he published A New Synthesis of Aldehydes, known as the Stephen Reaction. From 1926 to 1954, Stephen was professor of chemistry at the University of the Witwatersrand in Johannesburg.

== Personal life ==
In 1921, Henry married Edith Heywood at Haslingden. She died in 1929 in South Africa. They had one son, James (Jimmy) Stephen, in 1925. His second marriage was to Theodora (Dora) Elizabeth De Kiewiet, PhD in South Africa. They had three children (Michael, Edith, and Richard).

In 1957 Henry and his family moved to Oxford. Henry and Dora and together edited the organic chemistry journal Tetrahedron from 1957 up to his death in 1965, after which Dora continued on as editor.

His widow Dora donated the lake and woodland behind The Kilns in Risinghurst to the Berkshire, Buckinghamshire and Oxfordshire Wildlife Trust in 1969, and it was known until recently as the Henry Stephen/C.S.Lewis Nature Reserve monikered in his memory.
