= Anti-Slavery Society (1823–1838) =

British abolitionist organization

The Society for the Mitigation and Gradual Abolition of Slavery Throughout the British Dominions was founded in 1823, with the aim of abolishing slavery in the British Empire. This objective was substantially achieved in 1838 under the terms of the Slavery Abolition Act 1833. It was known as the London Anti-Slavery Society during 1838 before ceasing to exist in that year and was commonly referred to as the Anti-Slavery Society.

A successor organisation, the British and Foreign Anti-Slavery Society, also commonly known as the Anti-Slavery Society, was formed in 1839 by English Quaker and activist Joseph Sturge to fight for global abolition of slavery. Through mergers and name changes, it is now known as Anti-Slavery International.

== Background ==
The elimination of slavery throughout the world was frequently in the mind of early abolitionists. The committee which established the Society for Effecting the Abolition of the Slave Trade in 1787 campaigned for an end to the transatlantic slave trade from Western Africa to the New World, a trade then dominated by Britain.

The Slave Trade Act 1807 made the trade illegal in the British Empire, but brought no change to the condition of enslaved people. Following this, British abolitionists turned their attention to abolishing slavery itself, first in British colonies, and later in the US and the colonies of other European powers (e.g., in South America), and in parts of the world where it had long been legal, such as in the Middle East, Africa, and China.

== History ==
The Society for the Mitigation and Gradual Abolition of Slavery Throughout the British Dominions, also known as the Anti-Slavery Society, was founded on 31 January 1823, with a meeting of men met at the King's Head tavern in London. The society was also referred to as the Society for Mitigating and Gradually Abolishing the State of Slavery Throughout the British Dominions, the London Society for the Mitigation and Abolition of Slavery in the British Dominions, the Society for the Abolition of Slavery Throughout the British Dominions, and other variations, but has been commonly referred to as the Anti-Slavery Society. It was known as the London Anti-Slavery Society during 1838, before ceasing to exist.

Many of the founding members had been involved with anti-slavery campaigning previously, and their concerns were founded on Christian precepts. There had been a revival of evangelicism which had affected both Anglicanism and dissenters alike. In common with other voluntary organisations, the new body had a subscription system, a committee, officeholders, including a secretary. Founding members included William Wilberforce (although he did not get involved in the day-to-day running), Thomas Clarkson, Thomas Fowell Buxton, Zachary Macaulay (like Wilberforce, a member of the Anglican evangelical group known as the Clapham Sect), MP James Stephen, businessman and philanthropist James Cropper, Quaker banker and philanthropist Samuel Gurney, and Thomas Babington Macaulay. Thomas Pringle was secretary, and others who became involved with the society or who supported it included radical MP and dissenter William Smith; the Whig lawyers Henry Brougham, 1st Baron Brougham and Vaux, Thomas Denman, 1st Baron Denman, the judge Stephen Lushington, and James Mackintosh; Quaker scientists William Allen and Luke Howard; and Irish political leader Daniel O'Connell.

Auxiliary societies set up by women, such as the Birmingham and West Bromwich Ladies Society for the Relief of Negro Slaves, were supported by the society.

Its work included supporting the first slave narrative to be published by a Black woman, Mary Prince, The History of Mary Prince, A West Indian Slave (1831), organised by Pringle.

A wide range of views emerged among the members. Broadly, there were abolitionists who insisted on the full working out of the gradual process of abolition and amelioration (which had its successes), and the generally younger, more radical members, whose moral outlook regarded slavery as a mortal sin to be ended forthwith. Elizabeth Heyrick's 1824 pamphlet "Immediate, not Gradual, Abolition" gave the tone to the argument.

The latter group, including Joseph Sturge and many others, publicly campaigned throughout Britain. The idea was to engender public pressure for a new act of Parliament to outlaw slavery, rather than continue the gradualism of Whitehall's negotiations, mainly with colonial governments. In 1831 George Stephen and Joseph Sturge formed a ginger group within the Anti-Slavery Society, the Agency Committee, to campaign for this new act of Parliament. This campaign, and public pressure, led to the Slavery Abolition Act 1833, though it contained compromises which they disliked.

Jamaican mixed-race campaigners such as Louis Celeste Lecesne and Richard Hill were also members of the Anti-Slavery Society.

The indentured labour schemes were particularly opposed by Sturge and the Agency Committee; the full working out of the act would take several years, with slavery eventually being abolished throughout the British West Indies on 1 August 1838. In response to the new legislation, other members of the Anti-Slavery Society considered their work over. The original purpose, as reflected in the name of the society (abolition in the British dominions), had, they thought, been achieved.

Renamed the London Anti-Slavery Society in 1838, the organisation ceased to exist in this year.

=== The Anti-Slavery Society of 1839 ===
With abolition of slavery throughout the British dominions achieved, British abolitionists in the Agency Committee of the Anti-Slavery Society considered that a successor organisation was needed to tackle slavery worldwide. Largely under the guidance of Joseph Sturge, the committee duly formed a new society, British and Foreign Anti-Slavery Society on 17 April 1839. It too became widely known as the Anti-Slavery Society.

== Publications ==
From 1825, the society published the Anti-Slavery Monthly Reporter under the editorship of Zachary Macaulay. Its name changed to The Anti-Slavery Reporter in August 1830, and continued publication under the auspices of the British and Foreign Anti-Slavery Society from 1839.

== See also ==
- American Anti-Slavery Group
- Brazilian Anti-Slavery Society
