= Henry Sykes Stephens =

British Army officer and artist

Henry Sykes Stephens (1796 - 6 July 1878) was a British Army officer, painter and musician.

He painted Das Ahlerssche Haus in Hannover in May 1837.

He died on 6 July 1878 in London.
