= Notes & Queries =

Logo of The Guardian since 15 January 2018.

Notes & Queries is a weekly column in The Guardian newspaper which publishes readers' questions together with (often humorous) answers submitted by other readers.

The column first appeared on 13 November 1989, and was the idea of leader writer and columnist David McKie and Alan Rusbridger, then newly appointed as features editor of the paper. David McKie says he was inspired by seeing an information exchange notice board outside the poetry library at the Royal Festival Hall in London.

Although originally envisaged as a serious column, Notes & Queries quickly became known for the bizarre and whimsical nature of its questions and the wit and humour of its answers. Spin offs from the column include six books and two BBC television series. It has also given rise to various imitations and parodies.

The very first question to appear in Notes & Queries was:

How do you stop a neighbour's cat scratching up your garden?

As well as serious answers, one reply was "Concrete one or the other", thereby setting the tone for subsequent answers (and subsequently questions). Other notable questions that have been featured include:

- "How can I weigh my head?"
- "Why is water wet?"
- "Are slugs edible?"
- "Is this a question?"

Commenting on the continuing popularity of the column, its founding editor Brian Whitaker has said, "If Notes & Queries has any serious purpose, it is surely to promote a healthy scepticism about what we see in print."

== Books ==
- The Weirdest Ever Notes & Queries edited by Joseph Harker (Fourth Estate, 1997) ISBN 1-85702-778-7
- Notes & Queries: v. 1 edited by Brian Whitaker (Fourth Estate, 1992) ISBN 1-872180-22-1
- Notes & Queries: v. 2 edited by Brian Whitaker (Fourth Estate, 1992) ISBN 1-872180-34-5
- Notes & Queries: v. 3 edited by Brian Whitaker (Fourth Estate, 1992) ISBN 1-85702-052-9
- Notes & Queries: v. 4 edited by Brian Whitaker (Fourth Estate, 1993) ISBN 1-85702-160-6
