= Henry Robert Stephens =

Henry Robert Stephens (5 August 1665 – 15 June 1723) was a Belgian Jesuit theologian.

== Life ==
Stephens was born at Liège and entered the Society of Jesus on 7 September 1683. For over twenty years he was attached to the episcopal seminary of Liège, first as professor of dogmatic theology and later as its superior. During this period the Jansenists were active in Belgium, both in attacking the Jesuits and in opposing the papal decrees condemnatory of Jansenism. All of Father Stephens's published works were occasioned by these attacks.

== Works ==
In "Specimen doctrinæ a Jesuitis in Seminario Leodiensi traditæ" the Jesuits were accused, among other things, of corrupting faith and morals by their teaching. In answer to these accusations Stephens published a set of theses, "Conclusiones theologicæ miscellaneæ" (Liège, 1702) and had them publicly defended by one of his pupils.

In answer to another Jansenistic work known as the "Epistola Leodiensis de formula Alexandri VII", he published his "Vera defensio authoritatis Ecclesiæ" (Liège, 1707). The Jansenist, Henry Denys, thereupon defended the "Epistola" in an anonymously published work which called forth Stephens's "Author epistolæ Leodiensis denuo confutatus" (Liège, 1709).

His other works are the "Dissertatio theologica de Condemnatione Libri Janseniani" (Liège, 1710) and the "Consilium pacis adversariis propriis inter se disputantibus" (Liège, 1710). In all these works his name appears in the Latinized form of Stephani.
