= George Stephen (abolitionist) =

British solicitor, barrister, author and anti-slavery proponent

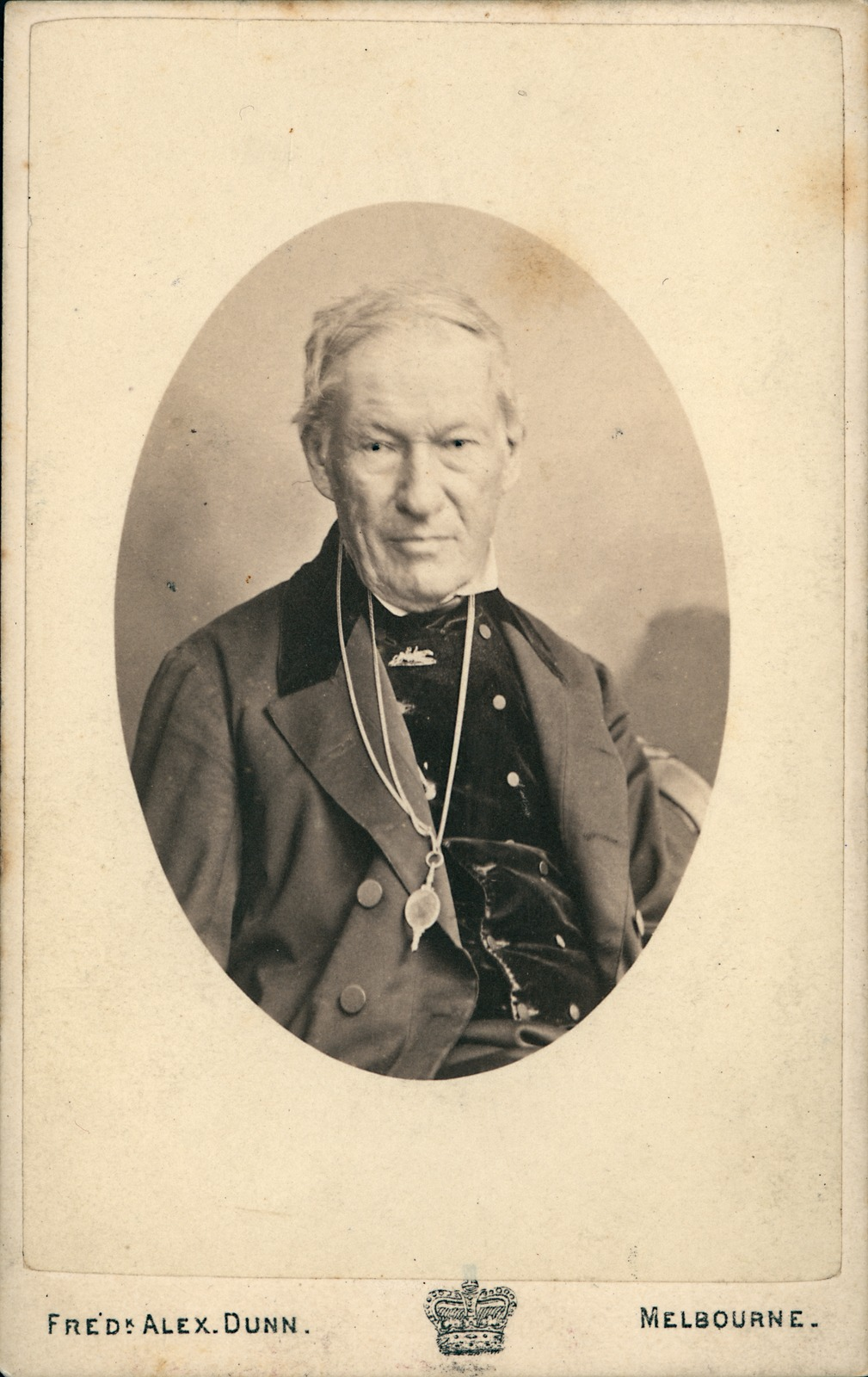
Portrait of George Stephen [ca. 1861-ca. 1875] (State Library Victoria)

Sir George Stephen QC (1794 – 20 June 1879) was a British solicitor, barrister, author and radical anti-slavery proponent. He was the leader of the Agency Society, a ginger group of the Anti-Slavery Society. He advocated for immediate rather than gradual emancipation and adopted more agitating campaigning tactics.

While he played a crucial role in the abolition of slavery, he was known to be quarrelsome and short-tempered. He became involved in disputes that damaged his career.

== Background and education ==
Stephen was the fourth and youngest son of James Stephen, C.B., by his marriage with Ann, only child of Henry Stent, of Stoke Newington, a village then just north of London. He was the brother of the Right Hon. Sir James Stephen, for many years Under-Secretary of State in the Colonial Office, whose policy he for a long period initiated and controlled. One of his cousins was Sir Alfred Stephen.

Born in 1794 at Saint Kitts, George Stephen was originally intended for the medical profession; but after spending three years in the study of anatomy, and going through a two-years' course at Magdalene College, Cambridge. He left Cambridge without graduating, after doing brilliant work, and entered the office of Messrs. Kaye & Freshfield, solicitors to the Bank of England. Having served his articles, he went into practice on his own account, and was engaged by the Government to obtain evidence against Queen Caroline, of whose guilt he was convinced.

== Abolitionism ==
It was, however, in connection with the movement for the abolition of slavery in the British colonies that he mainly distinguished himself. His father (James Stephen) had married, as his second wife, the sister of William Wilberforce, and was allied with that great man, Zachary Macaulay, Thomas Clarkson, and others in the abolition of the slave trade, achieved in 1807 George Stephen, along with other more radical abolitionists such as Elizabeth Heyrick, was a fierce advocate of immediate emancipation rather than the gradual emancipation that Buxton, Macauley and Stephen's father had originally been pushing for. Ultimately, he was successful in pushing anti-slavery leaders to achieve immediate emancipation.

=== Agency Committee ===
After joining the abolitionist cause, Stephen, became impatient with the 'tame monotony' of the Anti-Slavery Society and their push for gradual rather than immediate emancipation. He was critical of Wilberforce (and the old guard of the movement in general) as being indecisive and too ready to compromise. Wilberforce, he said, was excessively deferential to "rank and power". In a meeting of the Society in 1831, Stephen advocated for the formation of a splinter group of 'young' abolitionists that could take 'energetic measures.' His proposal was rejected by the elder abolitionists as too radical and likely to alienate supporters in Parliament. However, after the meeting, he was approached by James Copper and invited to a dinner with other abolitionists Quakers to present his ideas. He was given funding to form the Agency Committee (as a sub-group of the Anti-Slavery Society), composed of other 'immediatists' around the country, and pursued a series of tactics designed to generate 'pressure from without.'

=== The Agency Society ===
In 1832, emboldened by the likely election of a Whig government upcoming, Stephen broke off entirely from the Anti-Slavery Society. The Agency Committee became the Agency Society and they began pursuing more daring tactics - some of which were met with fierce and at times violent resistance by the West Indian interests.

==== The Placard Campaign ====
The West Indian interest group began posting placards around London advocating for the benefits of slavery to the Empire. In response, Stephen has anti-slavery placards printed and recruited people to follow the West Indian groups around London and, after they posted the placard and left, immediately post over it with an anti-slavery placard. These tactics infuriated the upcoming Whig government and were denounced by Thomas Buxton. At the next meeting of the Anti-Slavery Society, members voted to condemn the approach, increasing tensions between the established and elder abolitionists and the more radical activists.

==== Public Lectures ====
Building on the early campaign work done by Thomas Clarkson, Stephen and the Agency Society also orchestrated a lecture tour around the United Kingdom in 1832 to raise awareness and campaign for the abolitionist cause. Speakers were selected that were loyal to the immediatists cause and lectures focused on arguing against slavery based on facts and statistics. Circuits were established in advance and Society agents on the ground would promote the lecture and stir up public sentiment in advance of the lecturers arrival. These lectures were remarkably successful and, since the Society started in 1832, the number of local anti-slavery associations grew from two hundred to twelve thousand.

In one instance, the Agency Society organised lectures in Borough Market and Whitechapel, but were met with mobs of workers whose livelihoods depended on sugar from the colonies who were paid by slaveholders to shout down the speakers. Fights broke out around London. Stephen was assaulted three times and received a dagger in the post with the message 'Death to the Abolitionist!!!' on it.

=== Slavery Abolition Bill ===
As the details of the slavery abolition bill were debated, tensions grew over the inclusion of compensation and apprenticeships. The Agency Society fiercely condemned the inclusion of compensation measures and, in July 1833, Stephen began to campaign that abolitionists Members of Parliament should vote against the bill in protest of the inclusion of apprenticeships. On 24 July, Thomas Buxton successfully pushed for limiting the length of apprenticeships.

== Later life and Australia ==
Sir George (who was knighted in 1837, being the first so honoured after Queen Victoria's accession) subsequently ceased to practise as a solicitor, with a view to being called to the Bar. This was accomplished, in 1849, under the auspices of Gray's Inn; and Sir George then removed to Liverpool, where he practised at the local Bar for some years.

Business falling off, Stephen determined to follow his two sons to Australia, and took up his residence in Melbourne in 1855. Though this step was afterwards a matter of regret with him, he did fairly well at the Victorian Bar, principally in insolvency cases, and became a Q.C. in 1871. In 1866 he acted as Commissioner of Insolvent Estates at Geelong.

He died in Caulfield, Victoria on 20 June 1879.

== Works ==
In addition to an autobiography written for his children, Sir George published, in 1839, anonymously, Adventures of an Attorney in Search of a Practice; and was also the author of The Jesuit at Cambridge, published the same year; and of Adventures of a Gentleman in Search of a Horse, a brochure intended to illustrate in an amusing form the operation of the warranty law, which ran through half a dozen editions. Sir George also wrote several orthodox law books and a "Life of Christ."

== Family ==
Sir George married, in 1821, Henrietta, eldest daughter of the Rev. William Ravenscroft, Prebendary of Down Cathedral, Ireland, who died in 1869. Their son was James Wilberforce Stephen, later Attorney-General of Victoria and Supreme Court judge.

Mr. Justice FitzJames Stephen and Leslie Stephen were nephews of Sir George Stephen, being the sons of his brother, the late Right Hon. Sir James Stephen.
