= Corina Coaraci =

Brazilian journalist

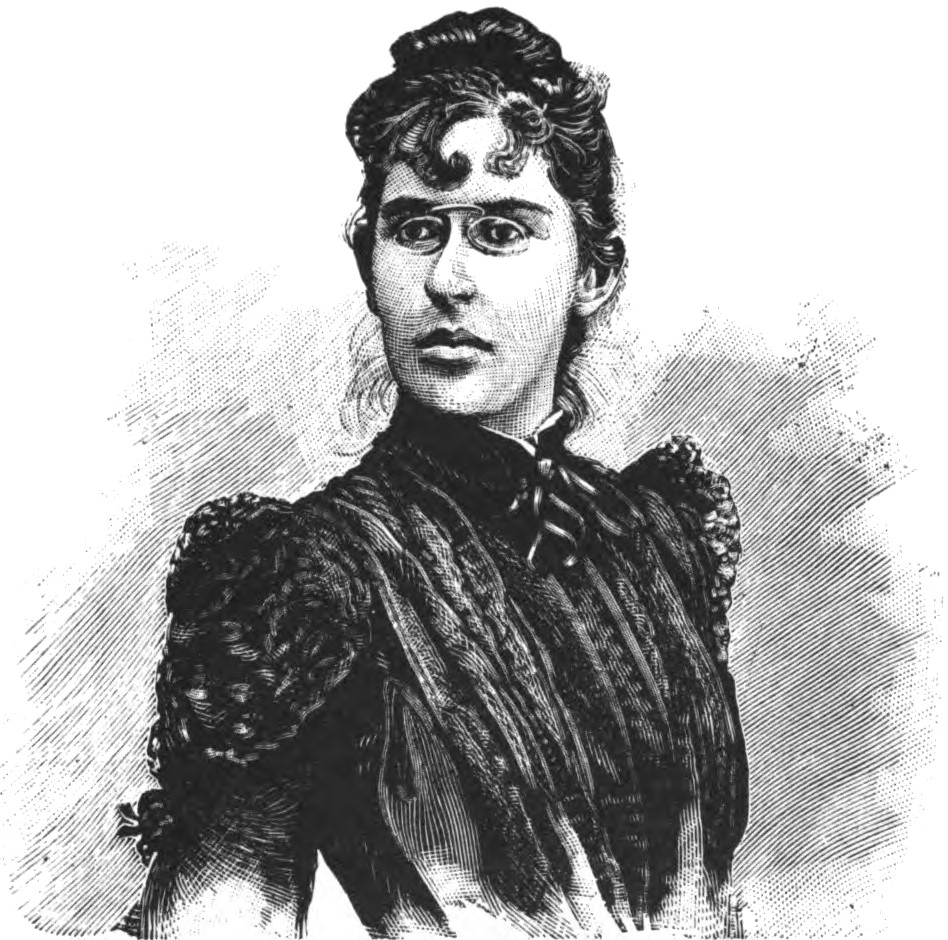
- Born: 18 April 1859 Kansas City, Missouri, United States
- Died: March 21, 1892 (aged 32) New Orleans, Louisiana, United States
- Occupation: Journalist, translator
- Citizenship: United States, Brazil
- Period: 1875-1891

Corina Coaraci (1869-1892) was a Brazilian journalist and author. She was born in the US but came to Brazil as a child. Her father was the magazine publisher Carlos Vivaldi. As a journalist, she contributed to several of her father's titles, and also to outlets such as Cidade do Rio, published by José do Patrocinio.

She was married to Visconti Coaraci. Her son Vivaldo Coaraci also became a noted journalist and writer.

She died in New Orleans in 1892.
