= Slave market (disambiguation) =

A slave market is a place where slaves are bought and sold.

Slave market may also refer to:

== Paintings ==
- The Slave Market (Vernet), an 1836 painting by Horace Vernet
- The Slave Market (Gérôme painting), an 1866 painting by Jean-Léon Gérôme
- The Slave Market (Boulanger painting), an 1882 painting by Gustave Boulanger
- Slave Market with the Disappearing Bust of Voltaire, a 1940 painting by Salvador Dalí

== Cinema ==
- The Slave Market (film), a 1917 American silent film
