= Salon of 1884 =

1884 art exhibition in Paris

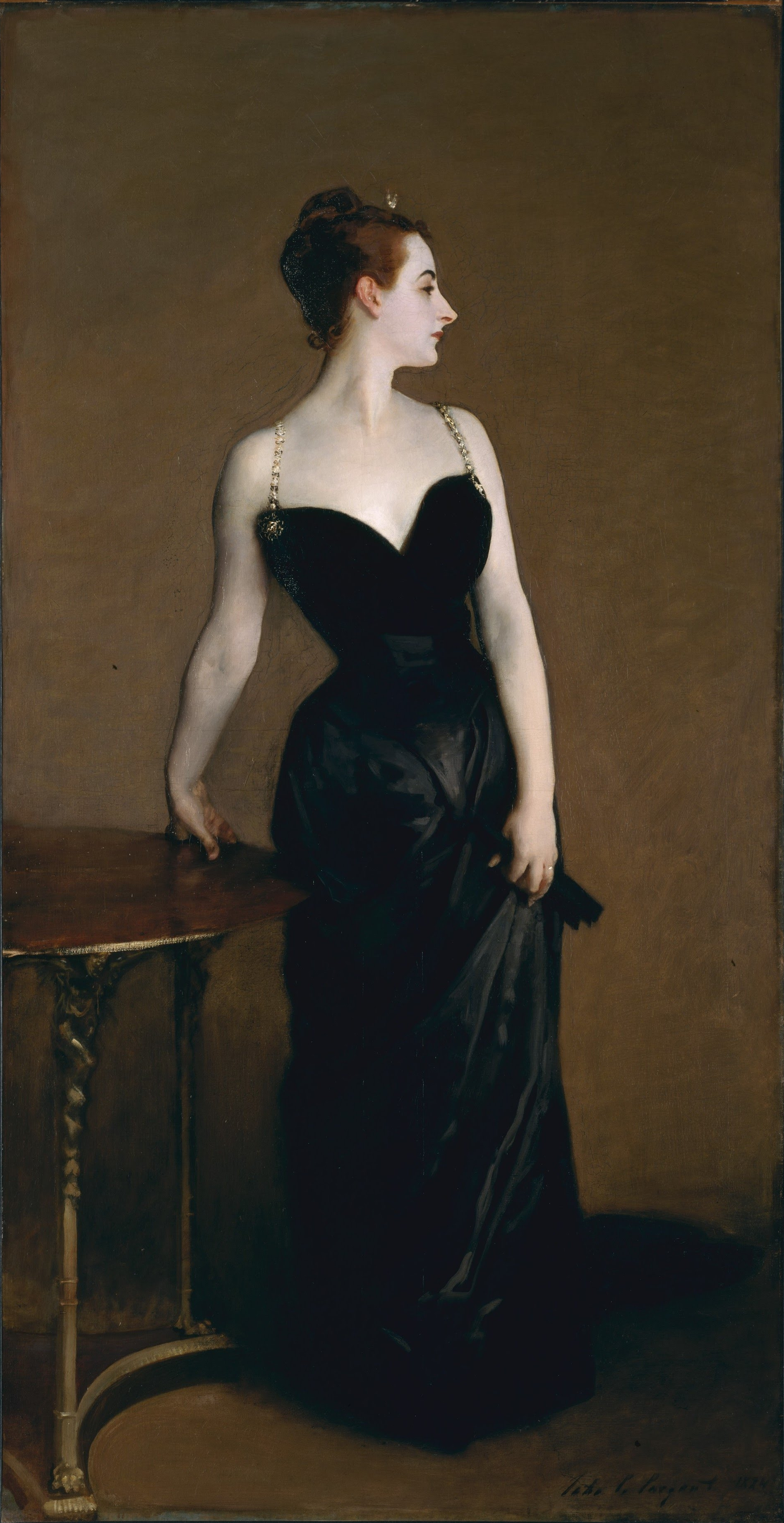
Portrait of Madame X by John Singer Sargent

The Salon of 1884 was an art exhibition held at the Palace of Industry in Paris which opened on 1 May 1884. It was the latest edition of the regular Salon organised by the Académie des Beaux-Arts. It followed the Salon of 1883 and featured submissions from leading painters, sculpturs and architects of the Belle Époque during the Third Republic.

John Singer Sargent displayed Portrait of Madame X, a depiction of the New Orleans-born Parisian socialite Virginie Amélie Avegno Gautreau. The original composition, which Sargent subsequently repainted, received an extremely hostile reaction. He relocated to England shortly afterwards and became a leading portrait painter.

His fellow American James McNeill Whistler chose to display two portaits he had produced a decade earlier his Portrait of Thomas Carlyle and Miss Cicely Alexander, considering them as appropriate follow-ups to the success of Whistler's Mother which he had exhibited successfully the previous year.

The Italian Impressionist Giuseppe De Nittis displayed one of the his final works Breakfast in the Garden. Traditional Academic Art was represented by figures such as Jean-Léon Gérôme who displayed two scenes of slave auctions in Ancient Rome.

== Gallery ==
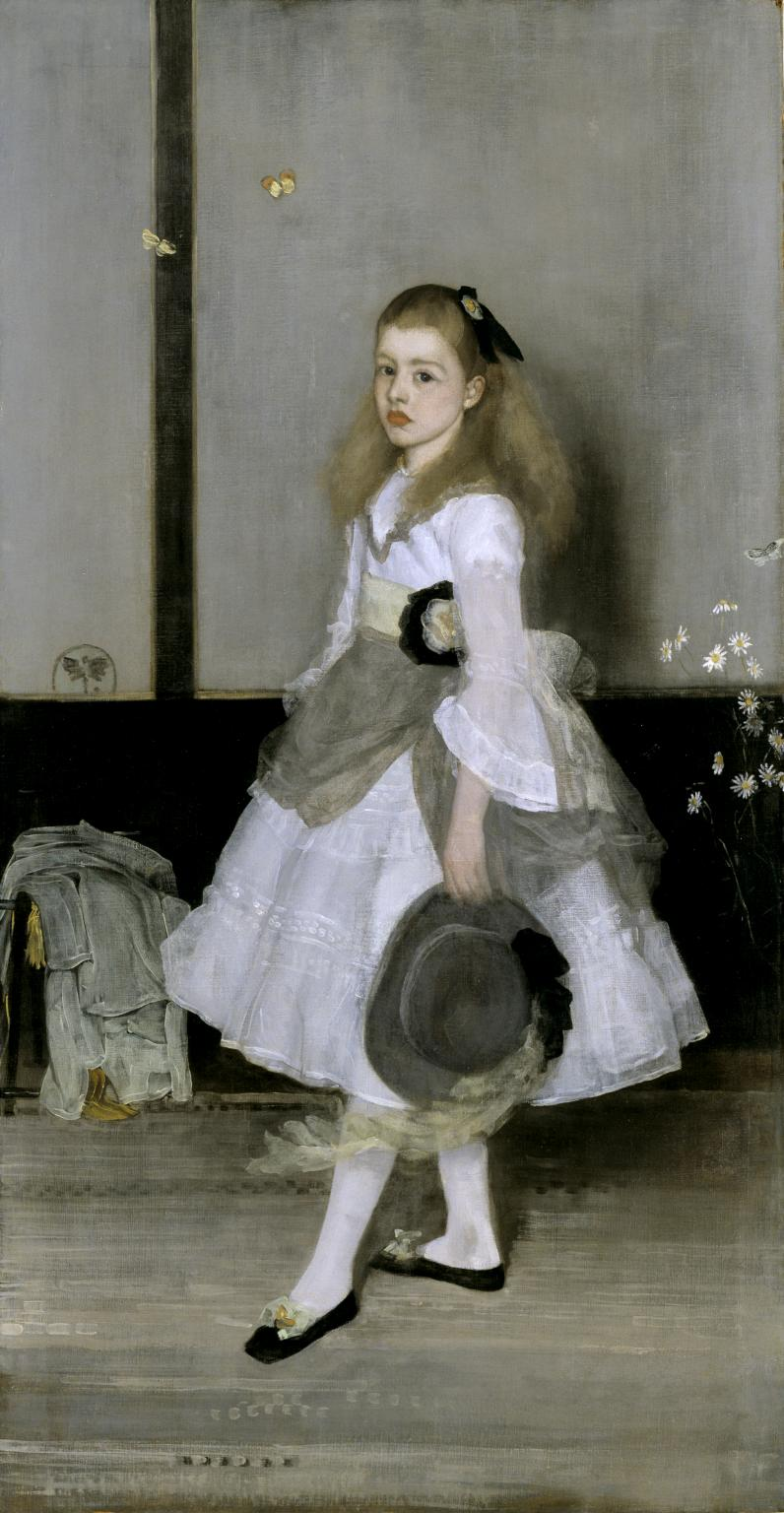
Miss Cicely Alexander by James McNeill Whistler

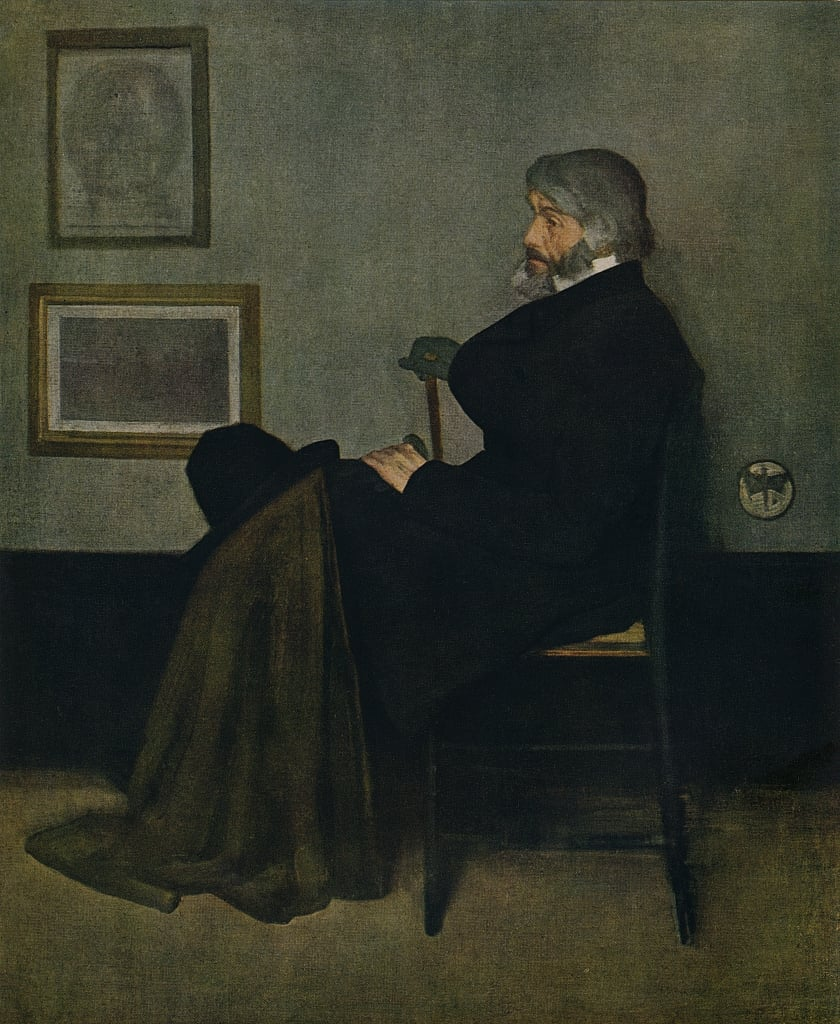
Portrait of Thomas Carlyle by James McNeill Whistler

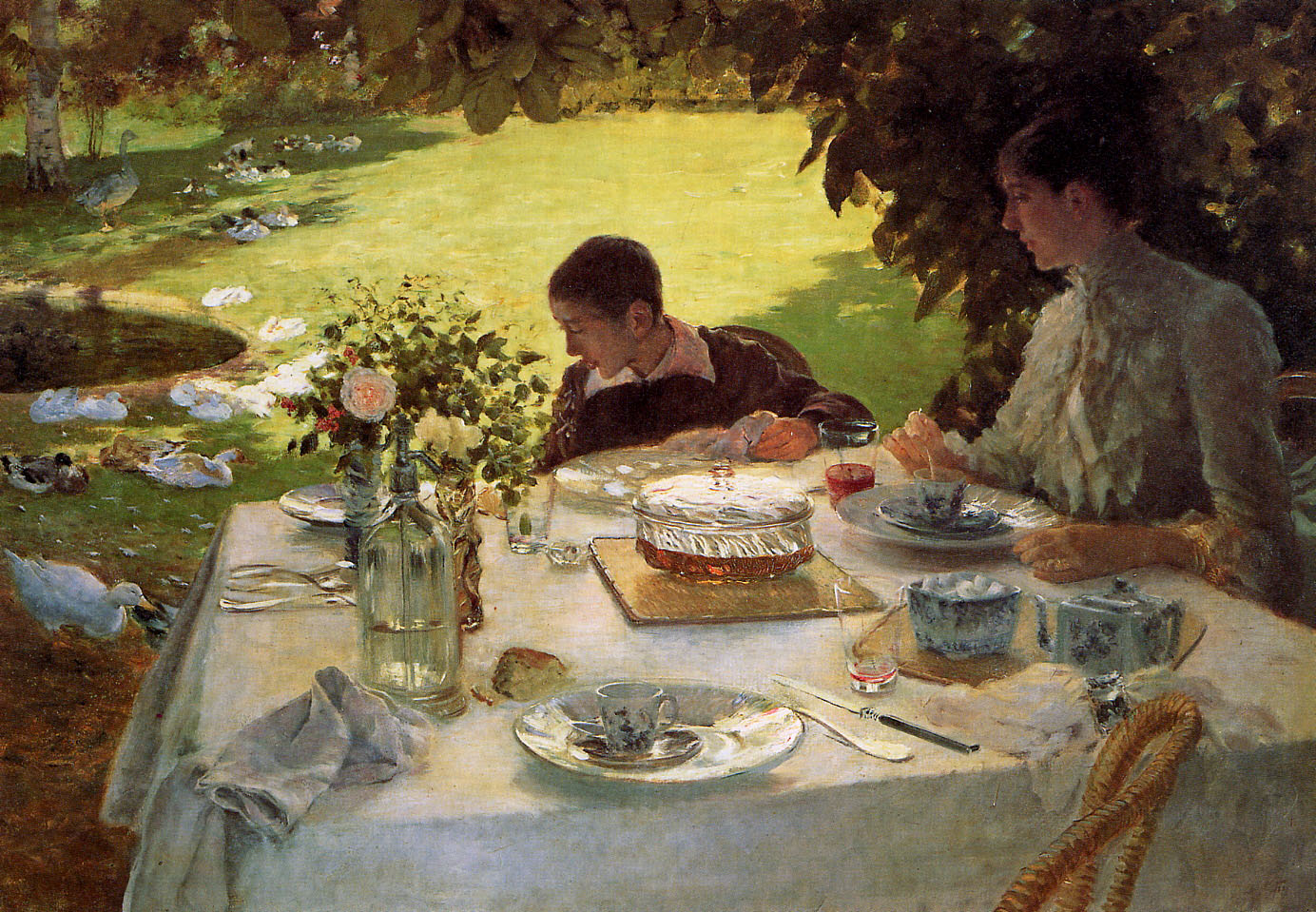
Breakfast in the Garden by Giuseppe De Nittis

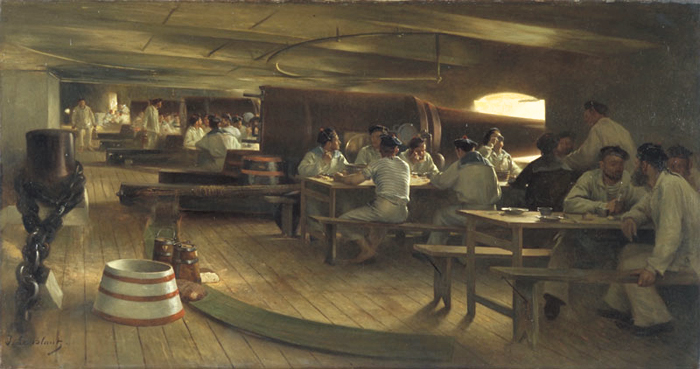
Crew Dinner by Julien Le Blant

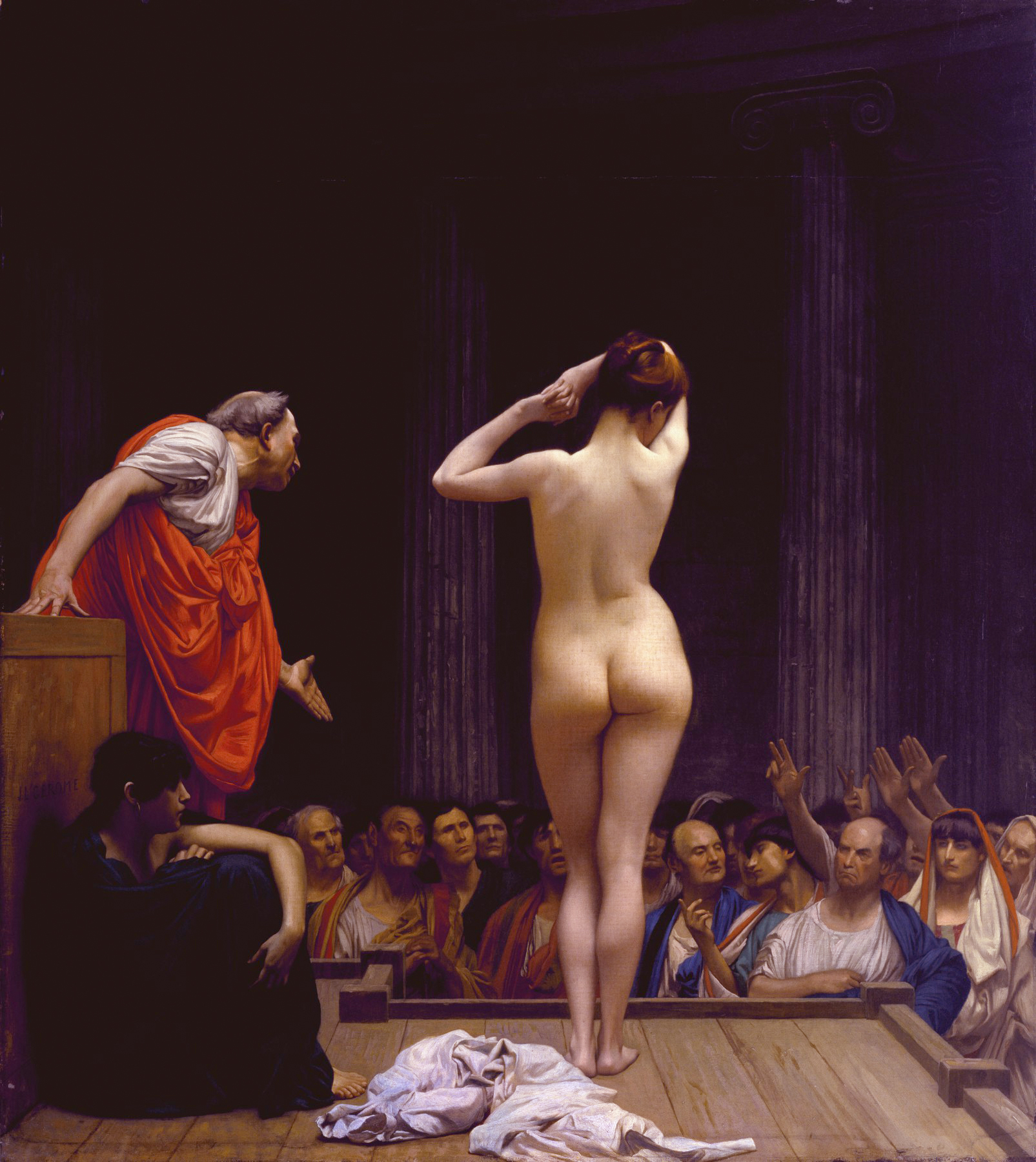
A Roman Slave Market by Jean-Léon Gérôme

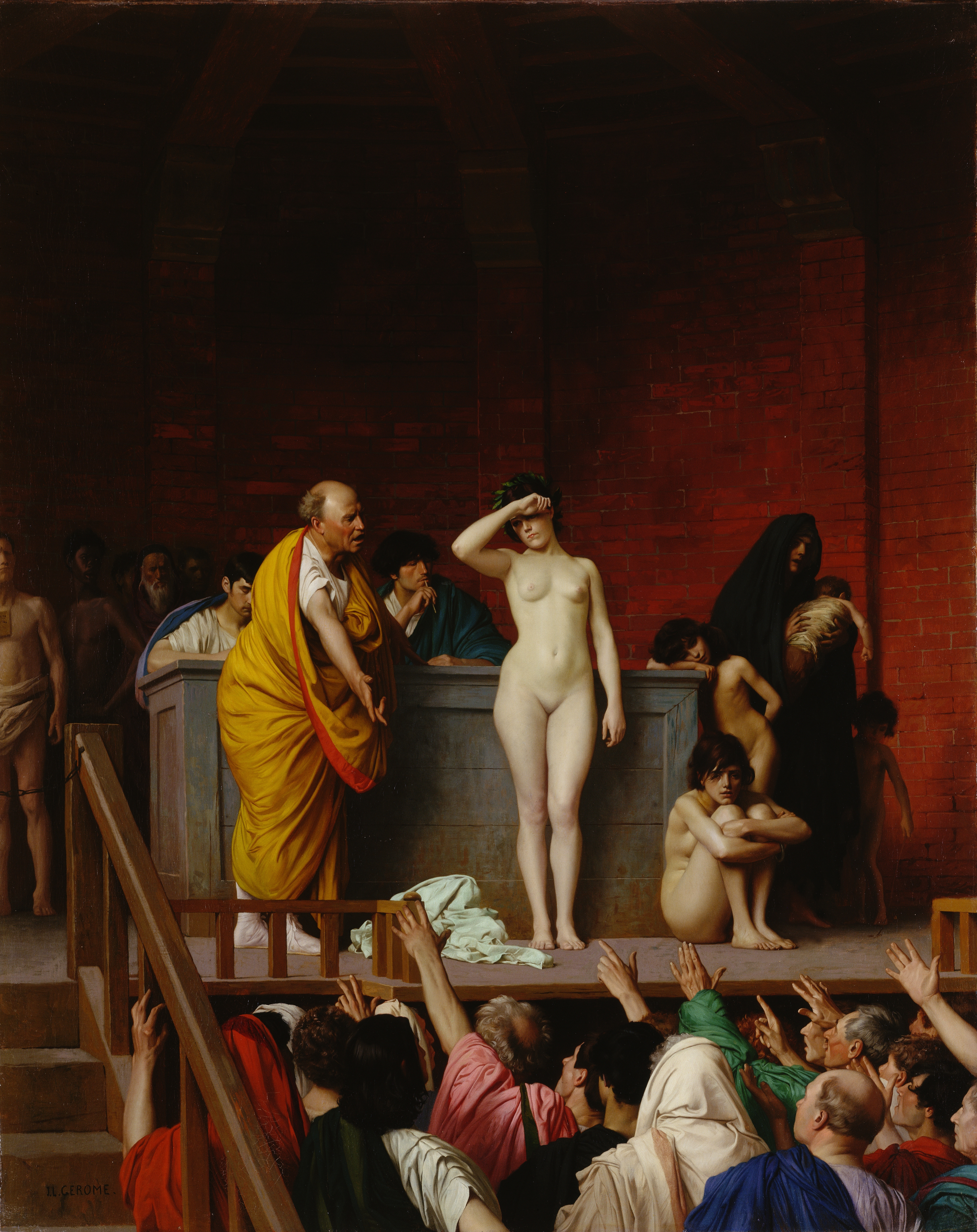
Slave Market in Ancient Rome by Jean-Léon Gérôme

Portrait of Paul Pierret by Jeanne Scapre-Pierret

Monsieur le ministre by Manuel Jiménez Prieto

== See also ==
- Royal Academy Exhibition of 1884, held at Burlington House in London

== Bibliography ==
- Allard, Sébastien, Loyrette, Henri & Des Cars, Laurence. Nineteenth Century French Art: From Romanticism to Impressionism, Post-Impressionism and Art Nouveau. Rizzoli International Publications, 2007.
- Morel, Dominique & Angiuli, Emanuela. Giuseppe De Nittis: la modernité élégante. Paris musées, 2010
- Sutherland, Daniel E. Whistler: A Life for Art's Sake. Yale University Press, 2014.
