= Arrangement in Grey and Black, No. 2: Portrait of Thomas Carlyle =

Painting by James Abbott McNeill Whistler

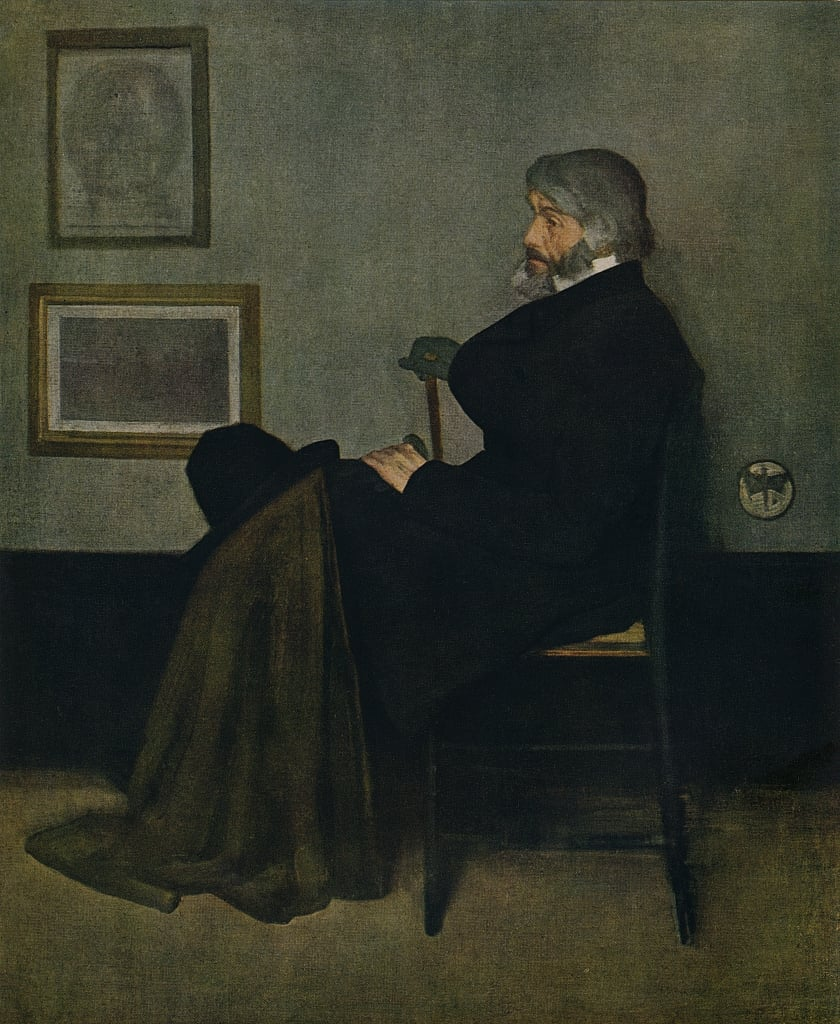
- Artist: James McNeill Whistler
- Year: 1872–73
- Medium: Oil on canvas
- Dimensions: 171 × 143.5 cm

Arrangement in Grey and Black, No. 2: Portrait of Thomas Carlyle is an 1872–73 oil painting by James McNeill Whistler. It depicts the Scottish essayist, historian and philosopher Thomas Carlyle in a composition similar to that of Whistler's 1871 Arrangement in Grey and Black No. 1: Portrait of the Artist's Mother, commonly known as Whistler's Mother. It is now in the Kelvingrove Art Gallery and Museum in Glasgow, Scotland.

== Background ==
By the time he sat for Whistler, Thomas Carlyle had lived in Chelsea, London, for 47 years, and was one of its most recognized residents. He lived at 24 Cheyne Row, now Carlyle's House, which is preserved as a museum, very near to Lindsey House, now 96 Cheyne Walk, where Whistler had his studio.

Accompanied by a mutual friend, Carlyle visited Whistler's studio, viewed the painting of the artist's mother, and according to Whistler "He liked the simplicity of it, the old lady sitting with her hands in her lap, and said he would be painted. And he came one morning soon, and he sat down, and I had the canvas ready, and my brushes and palette, and Carlyle said, 'And now, mon, fire away!'"

== Painting ==
Arrangement in Grey and Black: Portrait of the Artist's Mother. 1871. Carlyle liked this painting, and sat for Whistler in a similar pose.

There exist four preparatory studies in oil, and several drawings related to the finished painting. Several sketches in the Freer Gallery of Art suggest that while Whistler based the composition on the painting of his mother, he also considered variations: a chalk drawing shows Carlyle seated at an angle to the wall, a corner of the room shown at left, and without the coat that would be thrown over his lap in the painting. In the painting Whistler reverted to the planar composition of Arrangement in Grey and Black: Portrait of the Artist's Mother, and included the robe that created a broader shape, reminiscent of the dress from the earlier picture. The canvas is slightly larger than that of the portrait of Mrs. Whistler, and is of a vertical format. Other differences include a subtle turn of the subject's head toward the viewer, and the shape caused by the bunching up of Carlyle's coat; these result in a mood of psychological disturbance that is quite different from the more static pose of his mother's portrait.

The composition with a profile figure painted in a range of dark tones is shared with the Portrait of the Artist's Mother, as is the over-riding concern with aesthetic arrangement, for all the two works' psychological penetration. Whistler painted the preeminent moral philosopher of his time as a nuanced study in shapes and colours.

Though Whistler had initially requested two or three sittings, Carlyle posed from 1872 into the summer of 1873. Several witnesses recounted Carlyle's stillness juxtaposed with Whistler's frenetic working movements, with the artist Hugh Cameron recalling "It was the funniest thing I ever saw. There was Carlyle sitting motionless, like a Heathen God or Oriental sage, and Whistler hopping about like a sparrow.

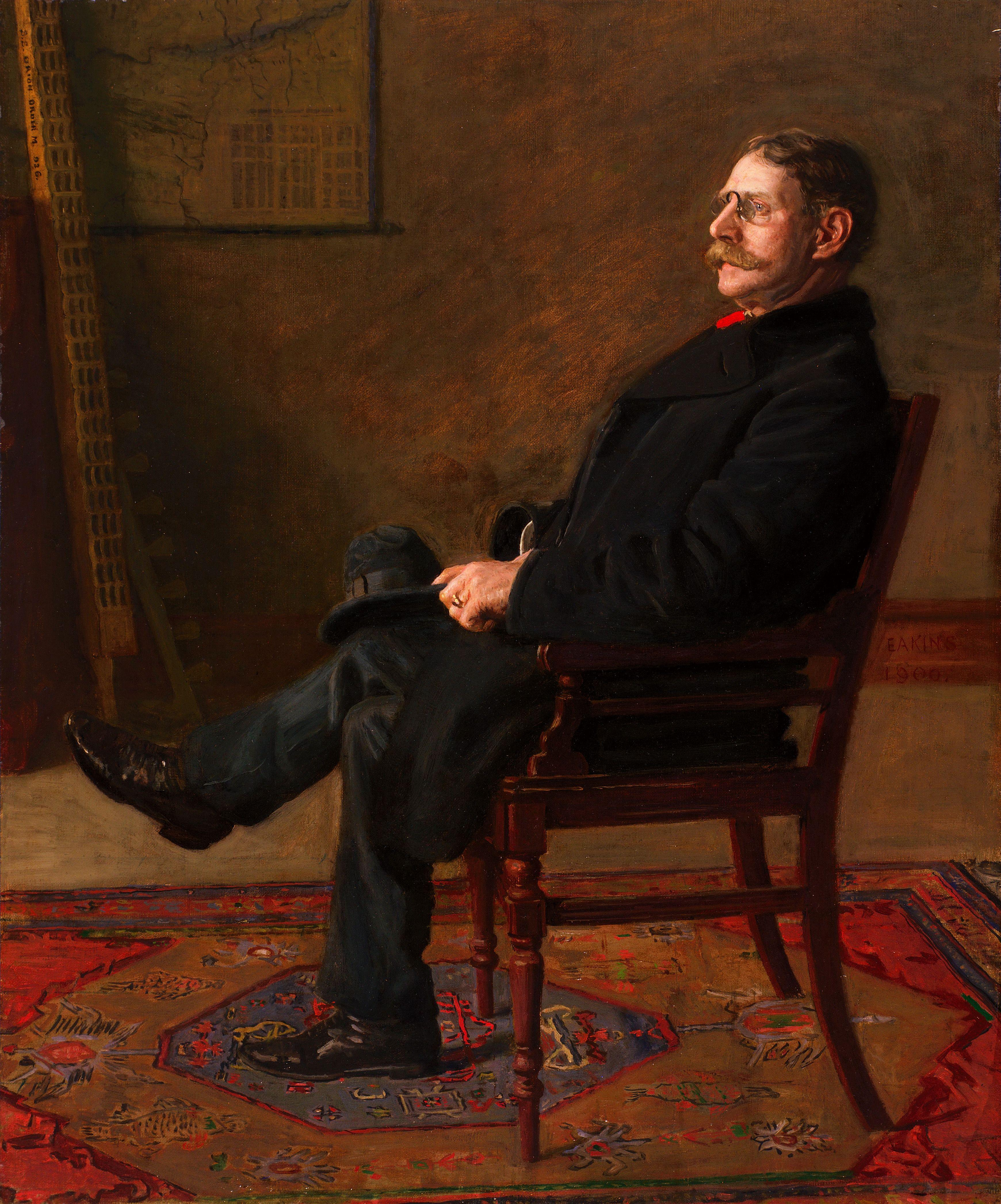
Frank Jay St. John (1900), by Thomas Eakins, indicates the influence of Whistler's portrait of Carlyle on a realist painter of a different sensibility.

Years later Whistler wrote of Carlyle:

"He is a favorite of mine. I like the gentle sadness about him! -- perhaps he was even sensitive -- and even misunderstood -- who knows!"

Whistler's reference to sadness, and the sense of 'turbulence' in the characterization, may have reflected the remorse of Carlyle's later years, following the death of his wife Jane Welsh Carlyle in 1866. While sitting for Whistler, Carlyle wrote in his journal "More and more dreary, barren, base, and ugly seem to me all the aspects of this poor diminishing quack world." The painting was exhibited at the Salon of 1884 in Paris along with Miss Cicely Alexander. In 1891 Arrangement in Grey and Black, No. 2: Portrait of Thomas Carlyle became the artist's first painting to enter a public collection when it was purchased, at the insistence of the Glasgow Boys, by the City of Glasgow.

== See also ==
- List of paintings by James McNeill Whistler
