= The Slave Market (Gérôme painting) =

1866 painting by Jean-Léon Gérôme

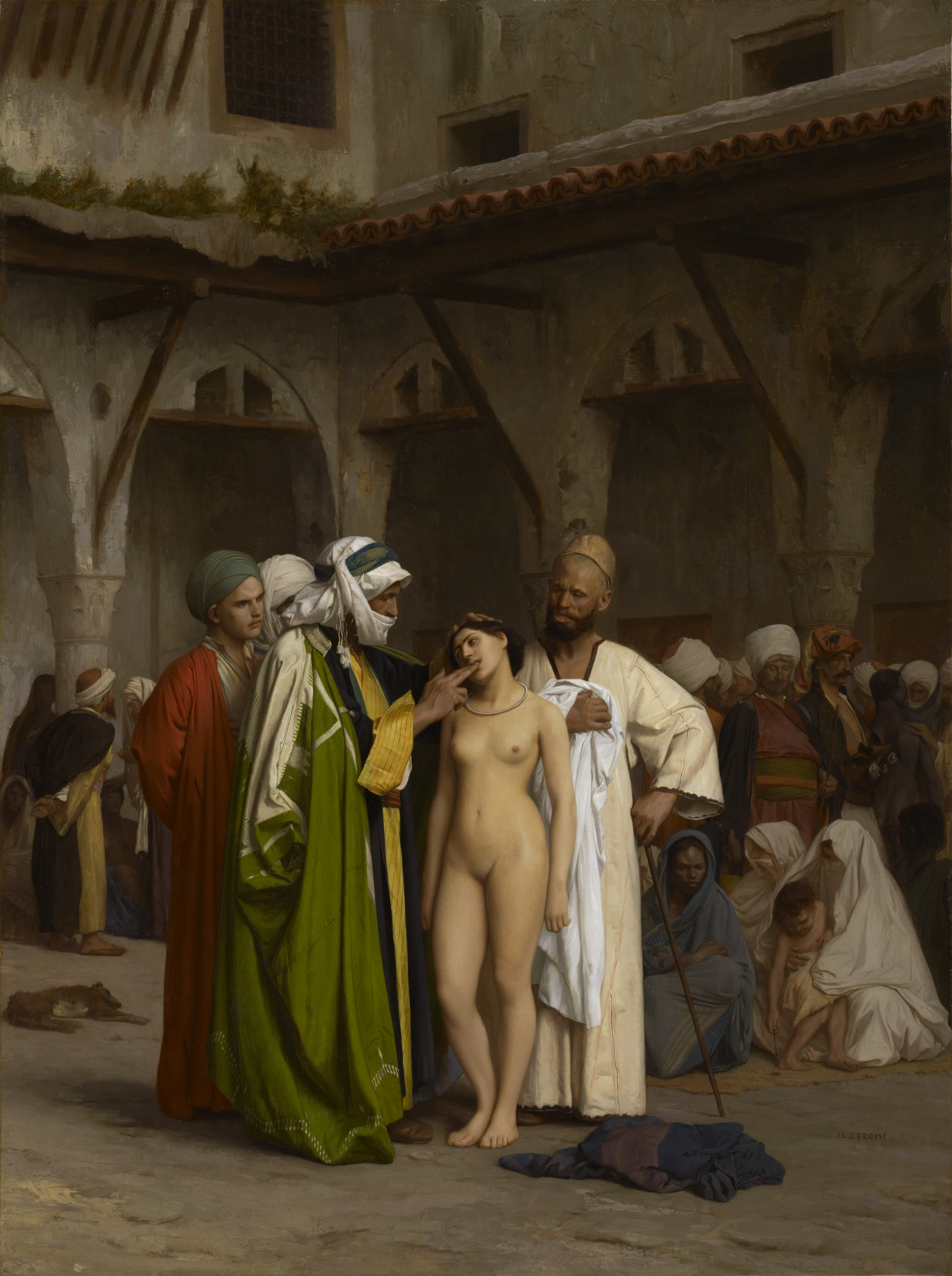
- Artist: Jean-Léon Gérôme
- Year: 1866
- Medium: Oil on canvas
- Dimensions: 84.6 cm × 63.3 cm (33.3 in × 24.9 in)
- Location: Clark Art Institute, Williamstown

The Slave Market (French: Le Marché d'esclaves) is an 1866 painting by the French artist Jean-Léon Gérôme. It depicts a West Asian or North African setting where a man inspects the teeth of a nude, female Abyssinian slave in the context of the Barbary slave trade.

The painting was bought by Adolphe Goupil on 23 August 1866 and exhibited at the Salon of 1867 in Paris. It was bought and sold several times until Robert Sterling Clark bought it in 1930. Since 1955 it is part of the Clark Art Institute's collection.

Along with Gérôme's The Snake Charmer (also owned by the Clark), The Slave Market has become an iconic example of 19th-century orientalist art.

== Reception ==
Maxime Du Camp, who had travelled extensively in the Near East, reviewed the painting from the 1867 Salon. He located the motif to Cairo's slave market and described the painting as "a scene done on the spot". Du Camp wrote:

It is one of these [more expensive] women, an Abyssinian, that M. Gérôme has taken as the principal figure of his composition. She is nude and being displayed by the djellab, who has the fine head of a brigand accustomed to every sort of abduction and violence; the idea of the eternal soul must not very often have tormented such a bandit. The poor girl is standing, submissive, humble, resigned, with a fatalistic passivity that the painter has very skillfully rendered.

== Race, religion, gender, and sexuality ==
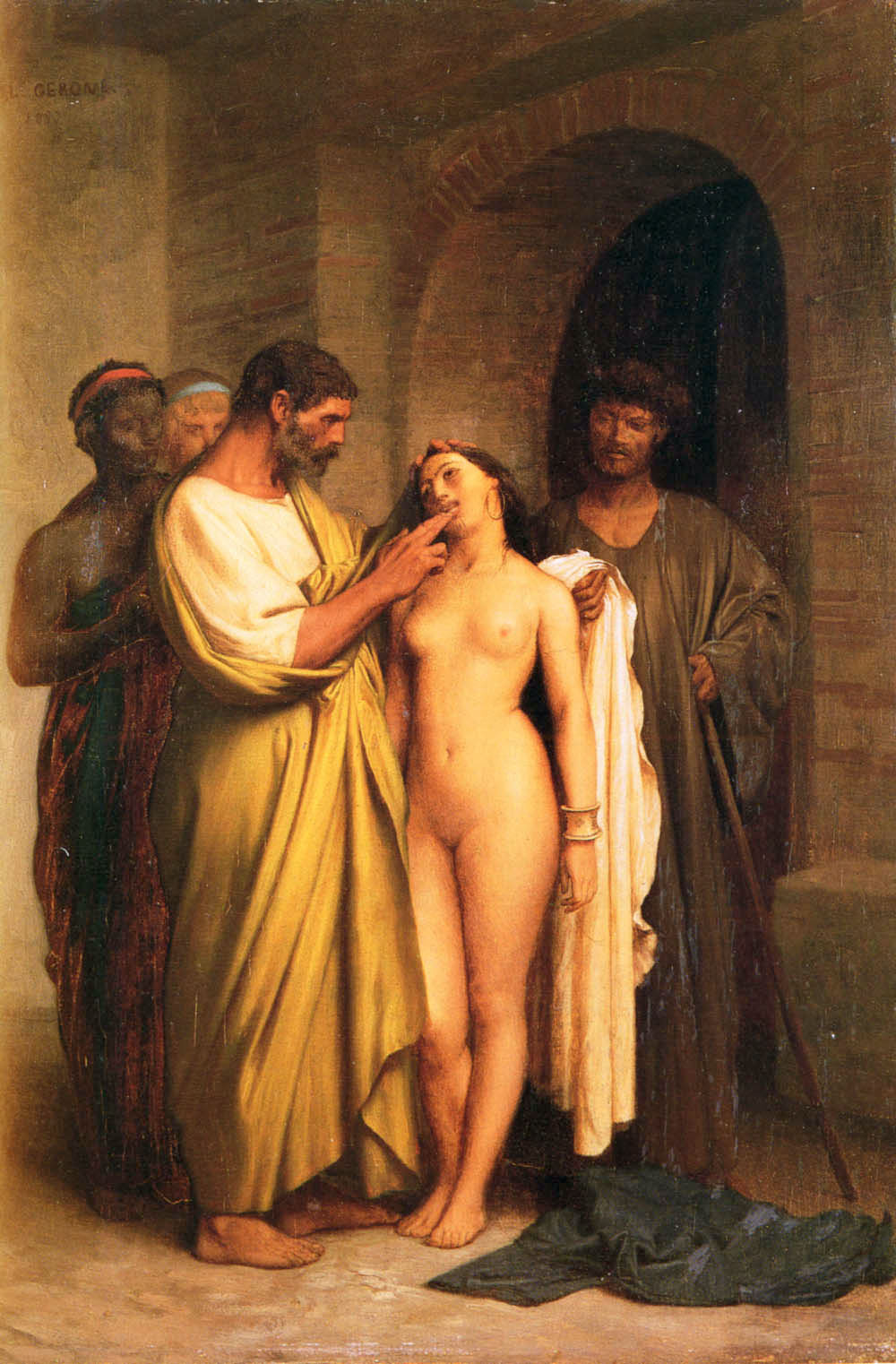
Gérome's Buying A Slave (1857), with a Classical setting, predated The Slave Market by almost ten years.

In an art historical context, harem scenes depicted domestic spaces for the women in the Muslim societies; the males were only included in barbaric and sexual relations. This painting presents an unspecific West Asian or North African setting in which a man inspects the teeth of a nude Caucasian female slave.

Gérome's depictions of slave trading predated The Slave Market and some were set in the Classical world. He painted a very similar scene in 1857, Buying a Slave, set in the ancient Greek or Roman world, in which racial differences between buyer, seller, and slave are not as apparent. The slaves depicted sometimes vary in skin color (as in The Slave Market of 1871); in all cases a woman or women are for sale, with men as buyers or sellers, but in the background of The Slave Market buyers can be seen inspecting a nude, dark-skinned male, and in the background of Slave Market in Ancient Rome (c. 1884) two enslaved males, one black and one white, can be seen.

A depiction by Gérôme of a slave in another context is Cave Canem (1881). In ancient Rome, a chained and collared man sits under the notice "Cave Canem", Latin for "Beware the Dog".

== Use in media ==
=== 2019 European elections ===
The right-wing political party Alternative for Germany used the painting in a political advert for the 2019 European Parliament election. The reprint was accompanied with the slogan "Europeans vote AfD!" and "So Europe doesn't become Eurabia!" Deutsche Welle reported how the painting was used with racist intent, in that it suggestively depicted dark-skinned men with beards and turbans "inspecting the teeth of a nude white woman". The Clark Art Institute denounced AfD's use of the painting strongly.

== Gallery: Gérôme's depictions of slaves and slave markets ==
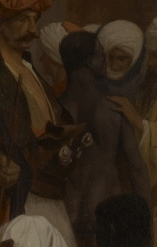
Detail from The Slave Market (1866) showing an enslaved dark-skinned male

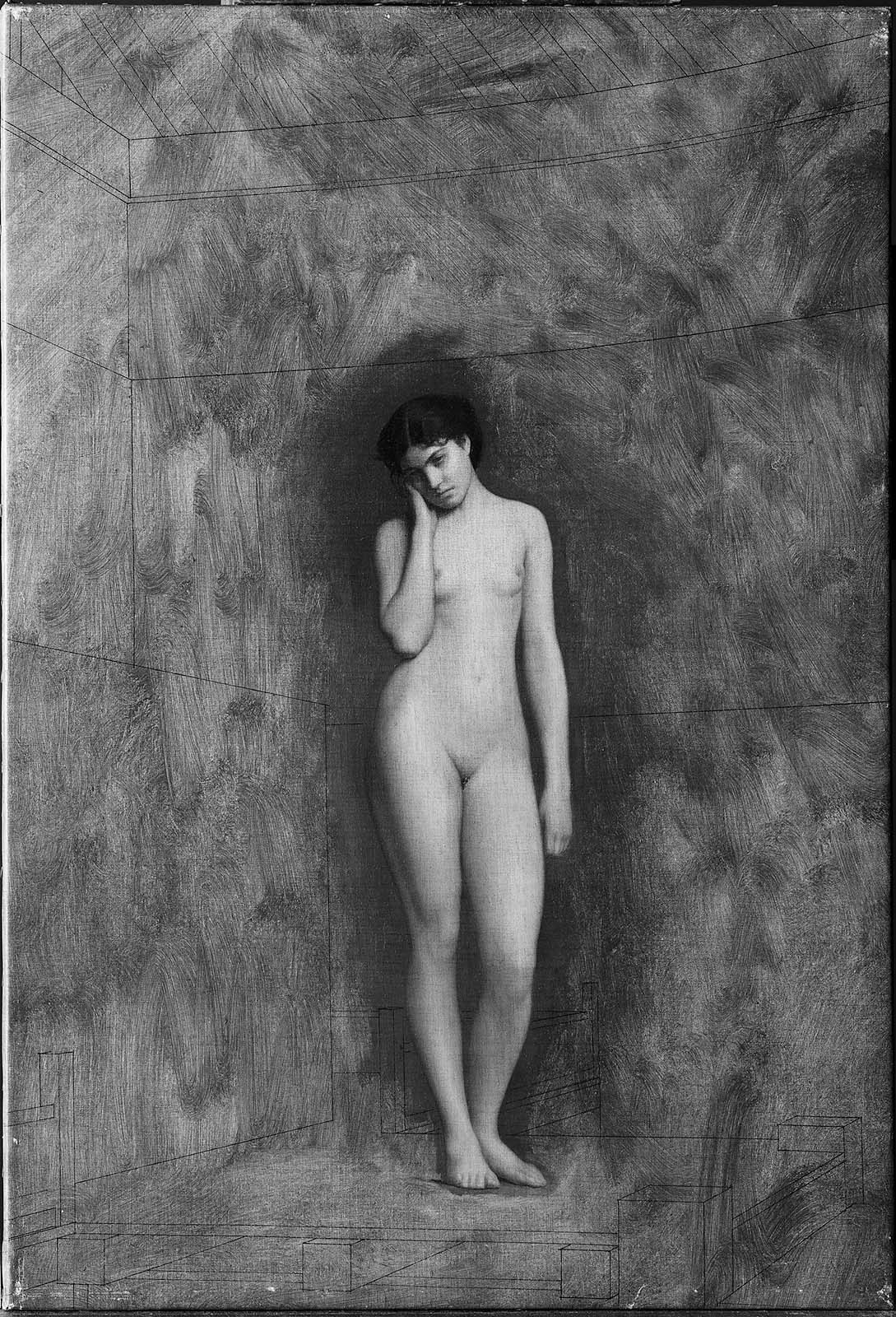
Greek Slave (1870), an unfinished (due to theft) painting, Museum of Fine Arts, Boston

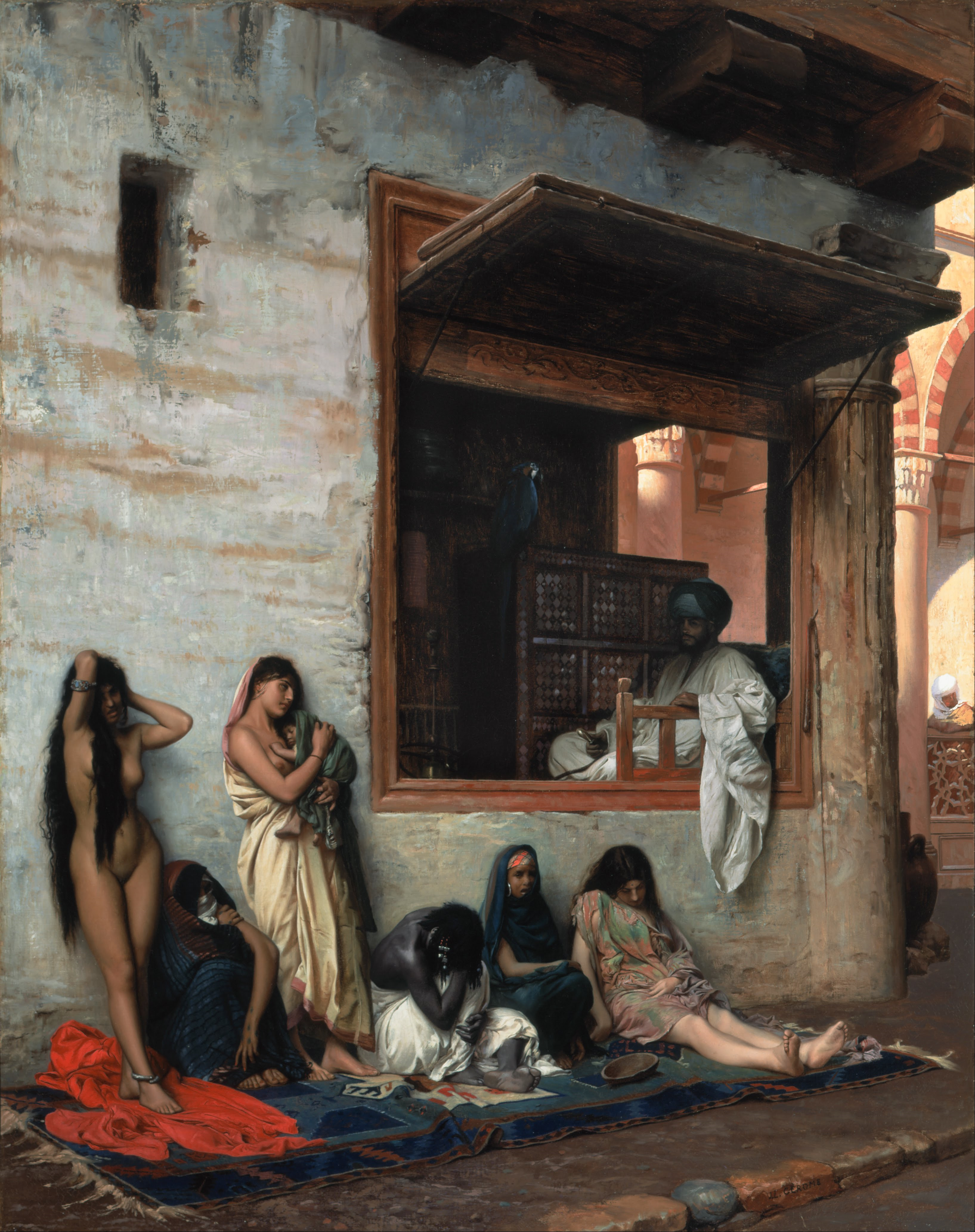
The Slave Market (1871), Cincinnati Art Museum

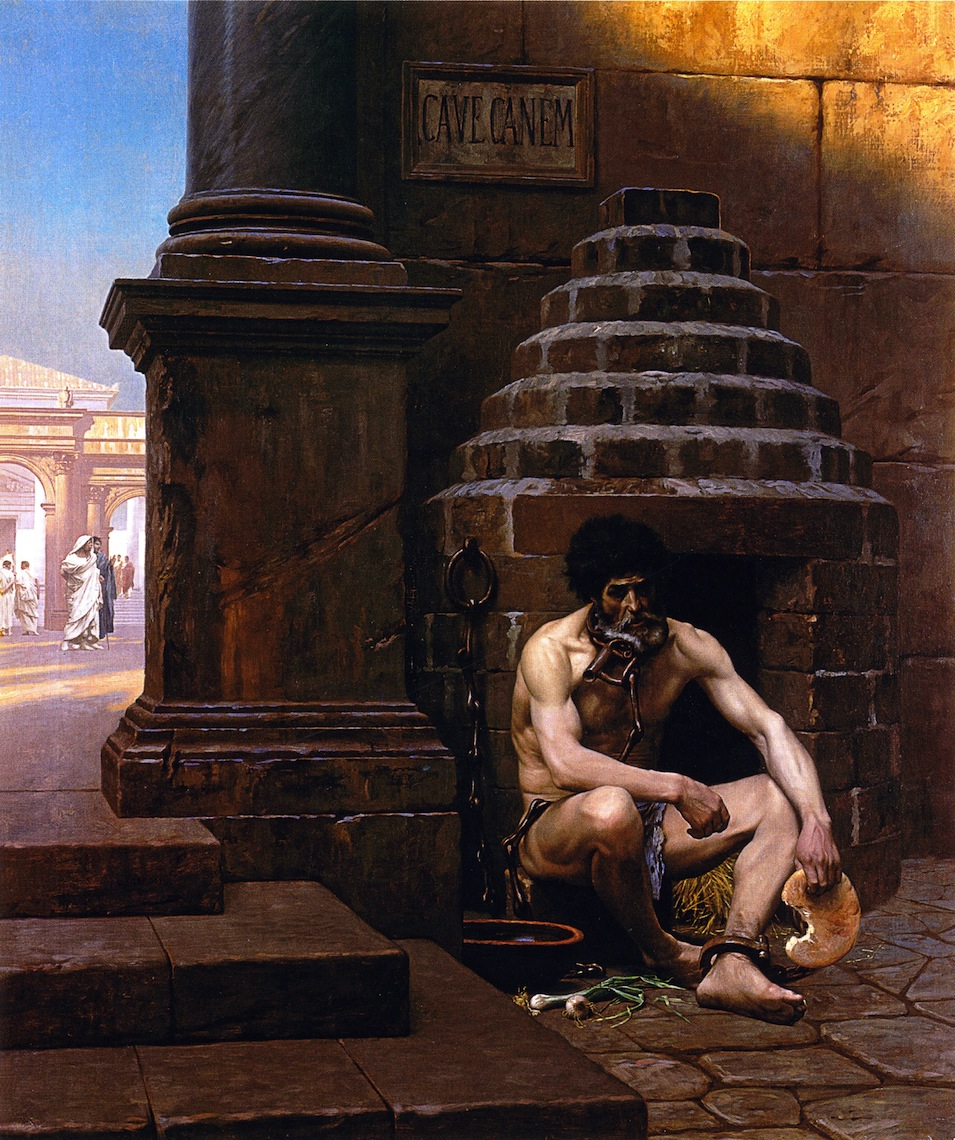
Cave Canem, 1881, Musée Georges-Garret

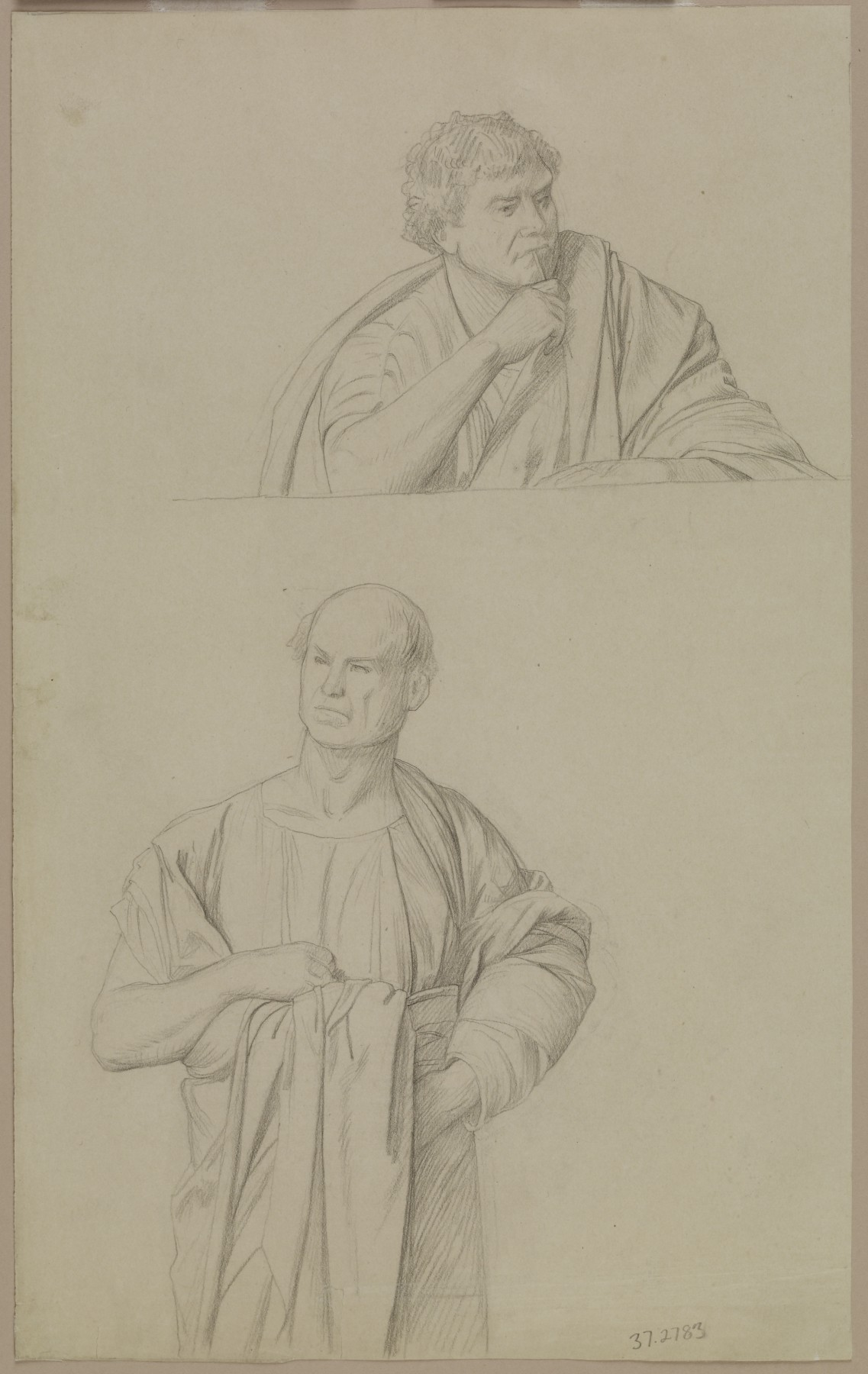
Studies for Slave Market in Ancient Rome (above) and A Roman Slave Market (below), Walters Art Museum

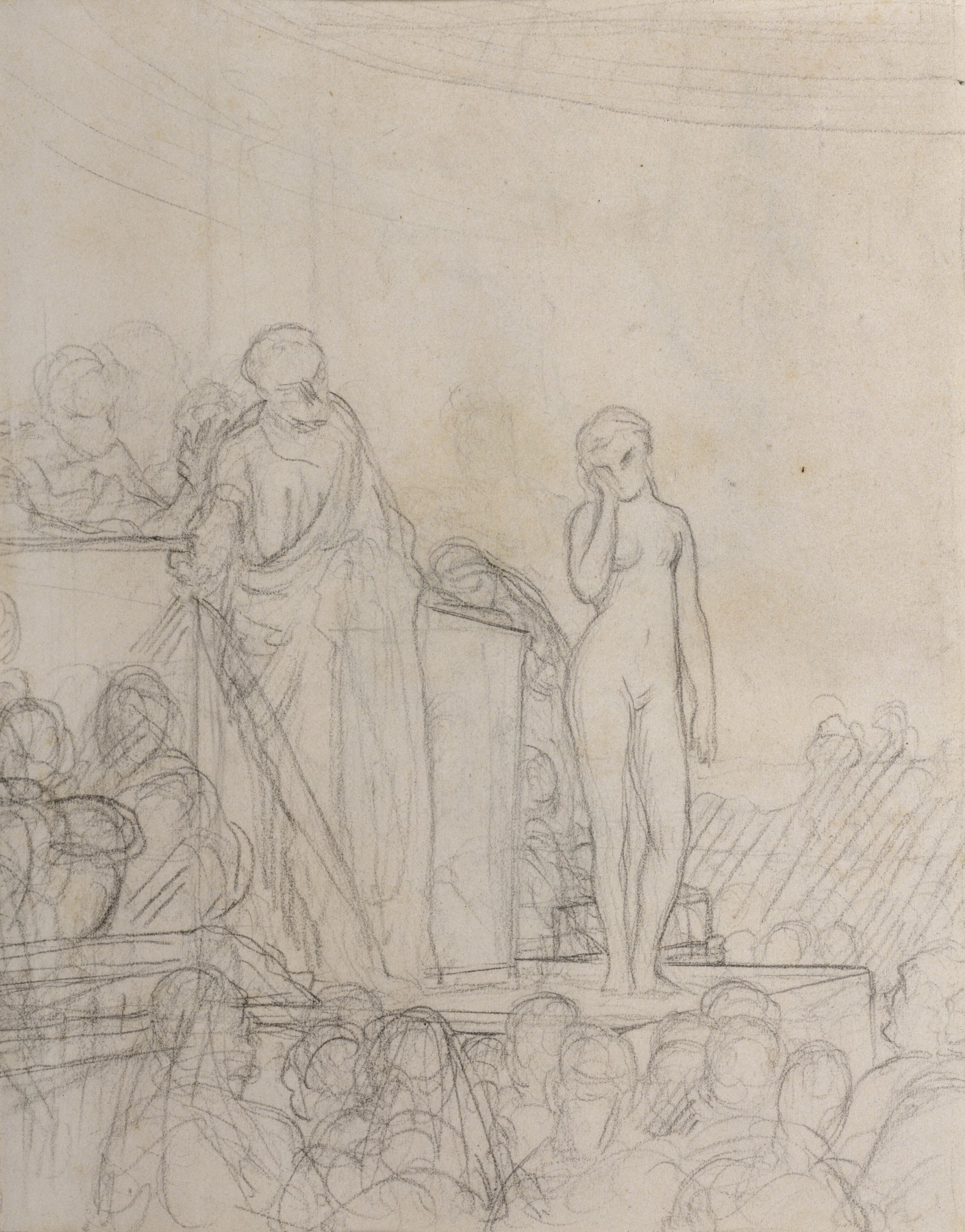
Study for Slave Market in Ancient Rome, graphite and black crayon (c. 1884), Walters Art Museum

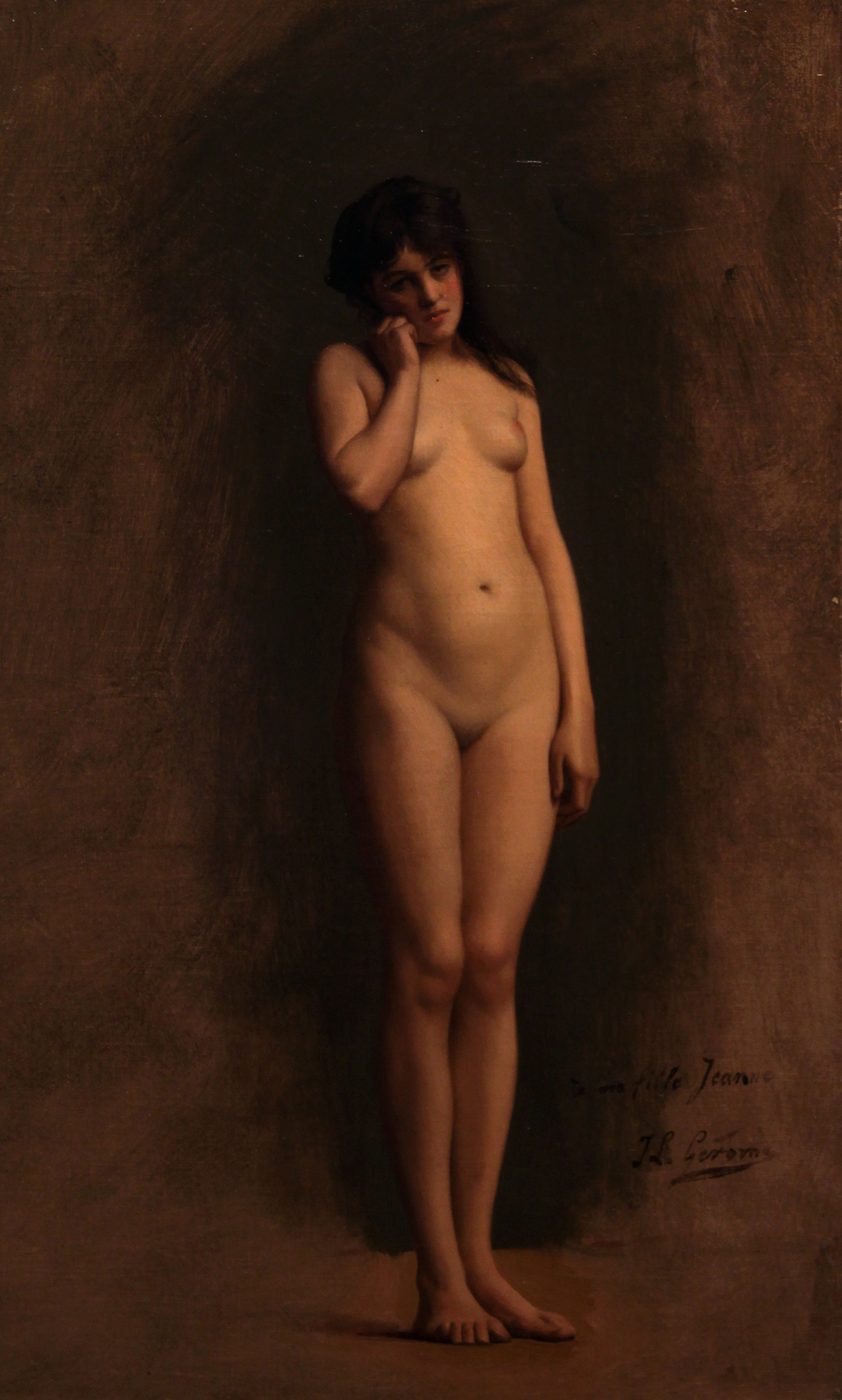
Study for Slave Market in Ancient Rome, oil on canvas, Musée Georges-Garret

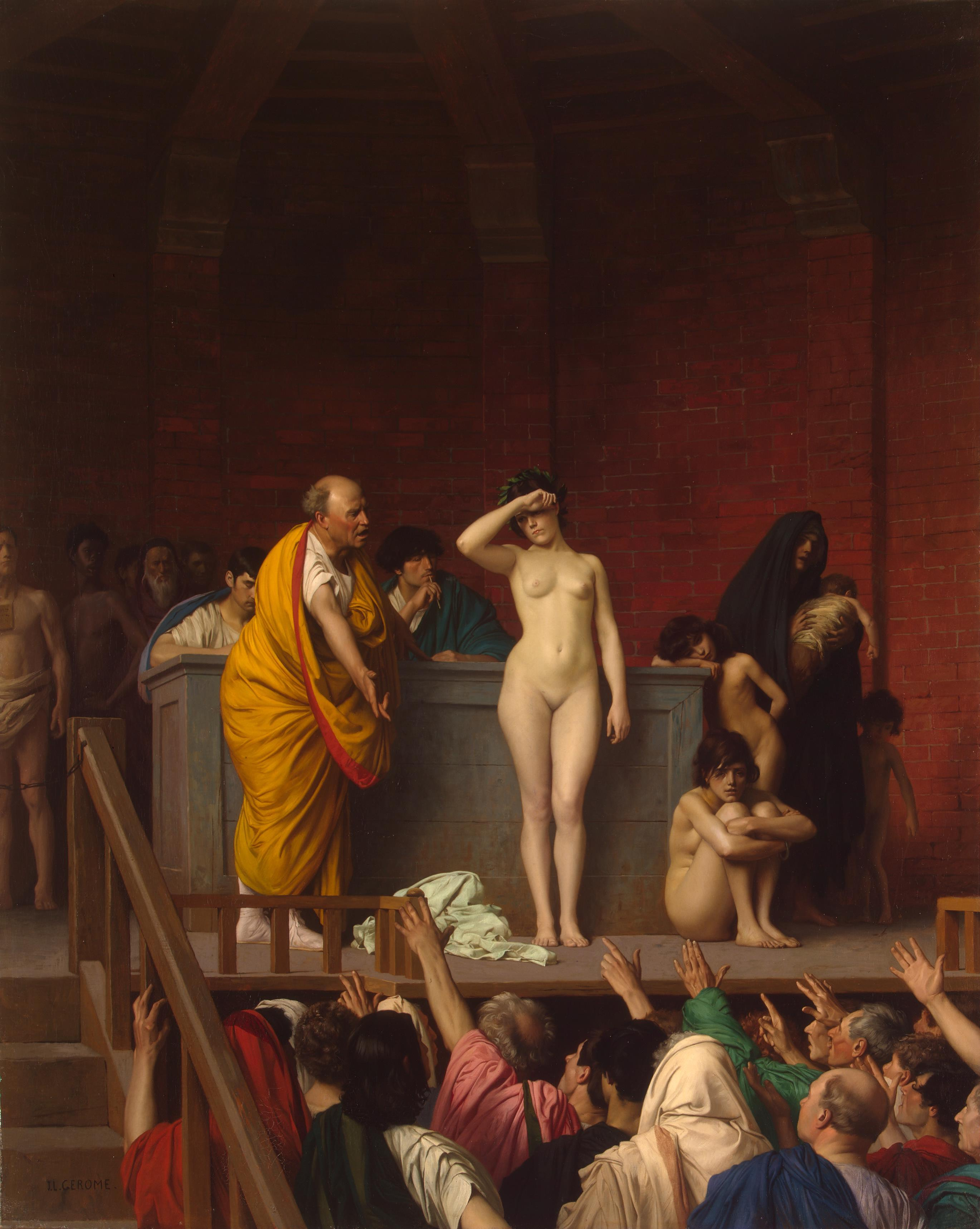
Slave Market in Ancient Rome (c. 1884), Hermitage Museum

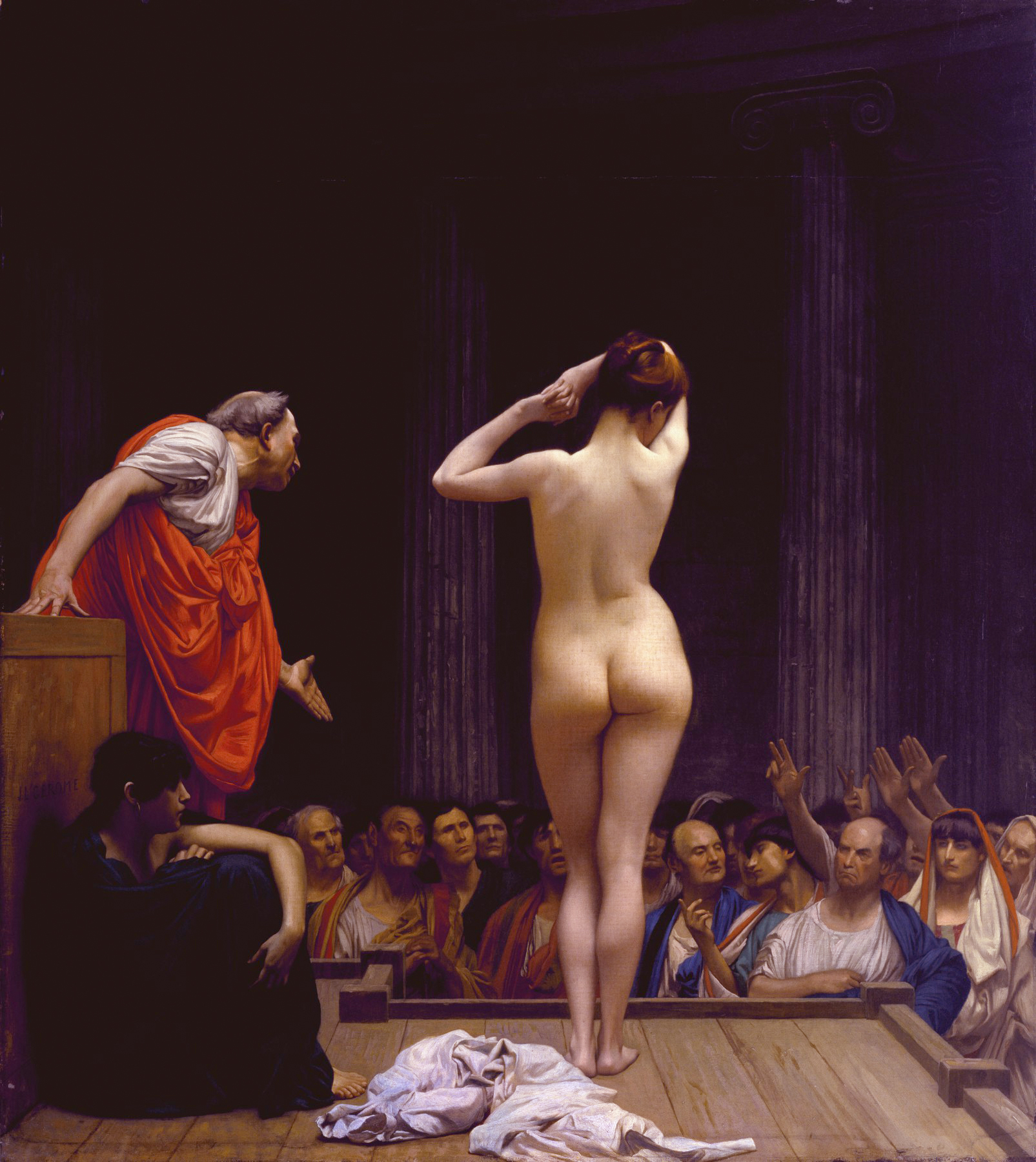
A Roman Slave Market (c. 1884), Walters Art Museum

== Gallery: Other Academic and Orientalist depictions of slave markets ==
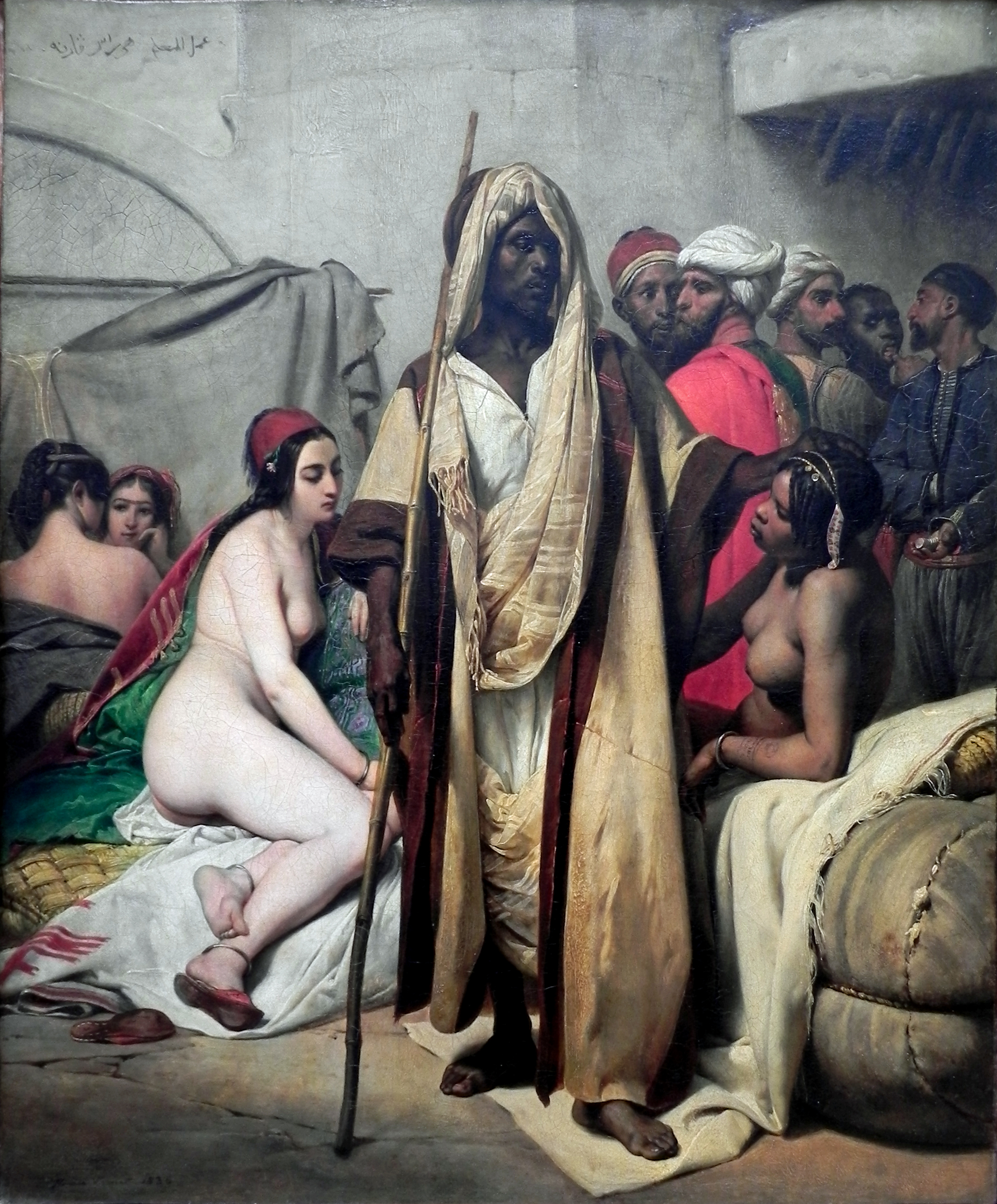
The Slave Market by Horace Vernet, 1836

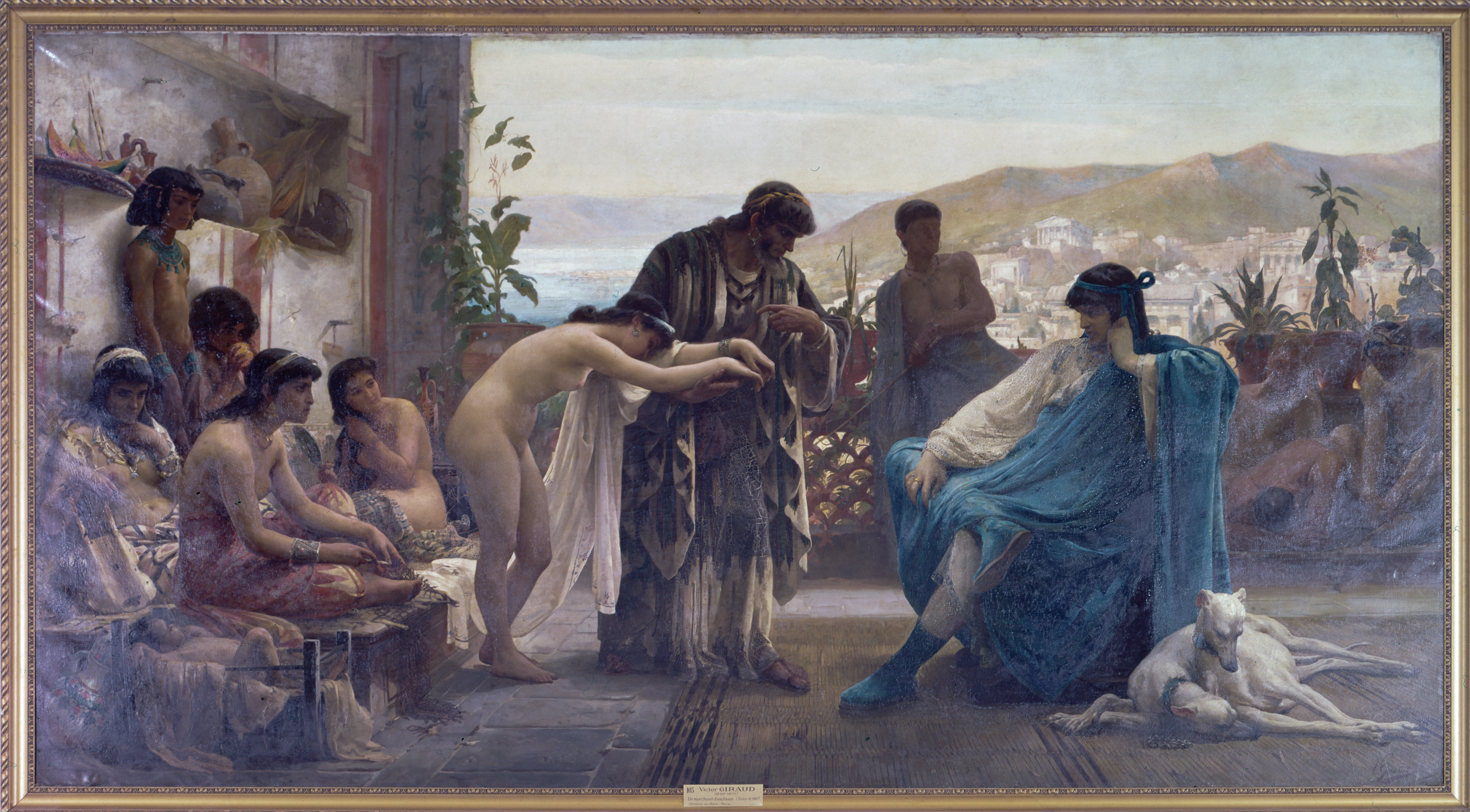
Victor Giraud, Un marchand d'esclaves, 1867, Musée d'Orsay

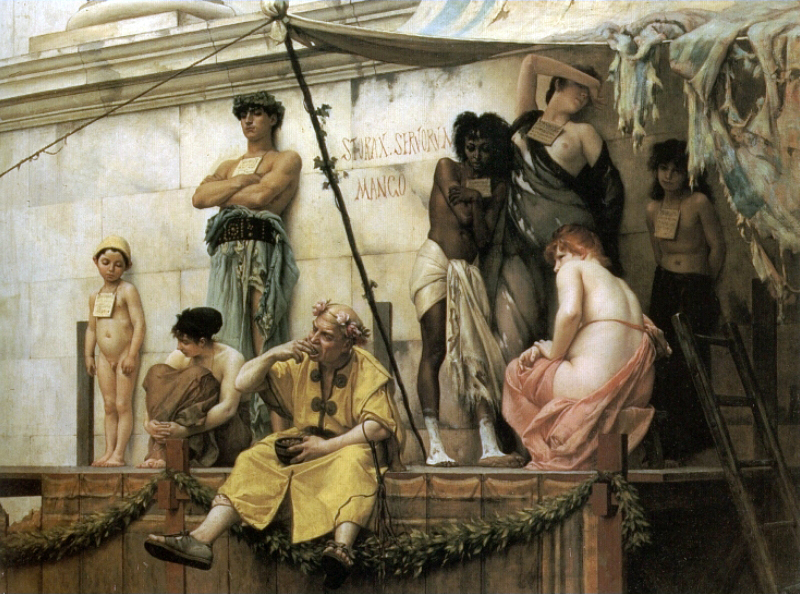
Gustave Boulanger, The Slave Market, 1886, private collection

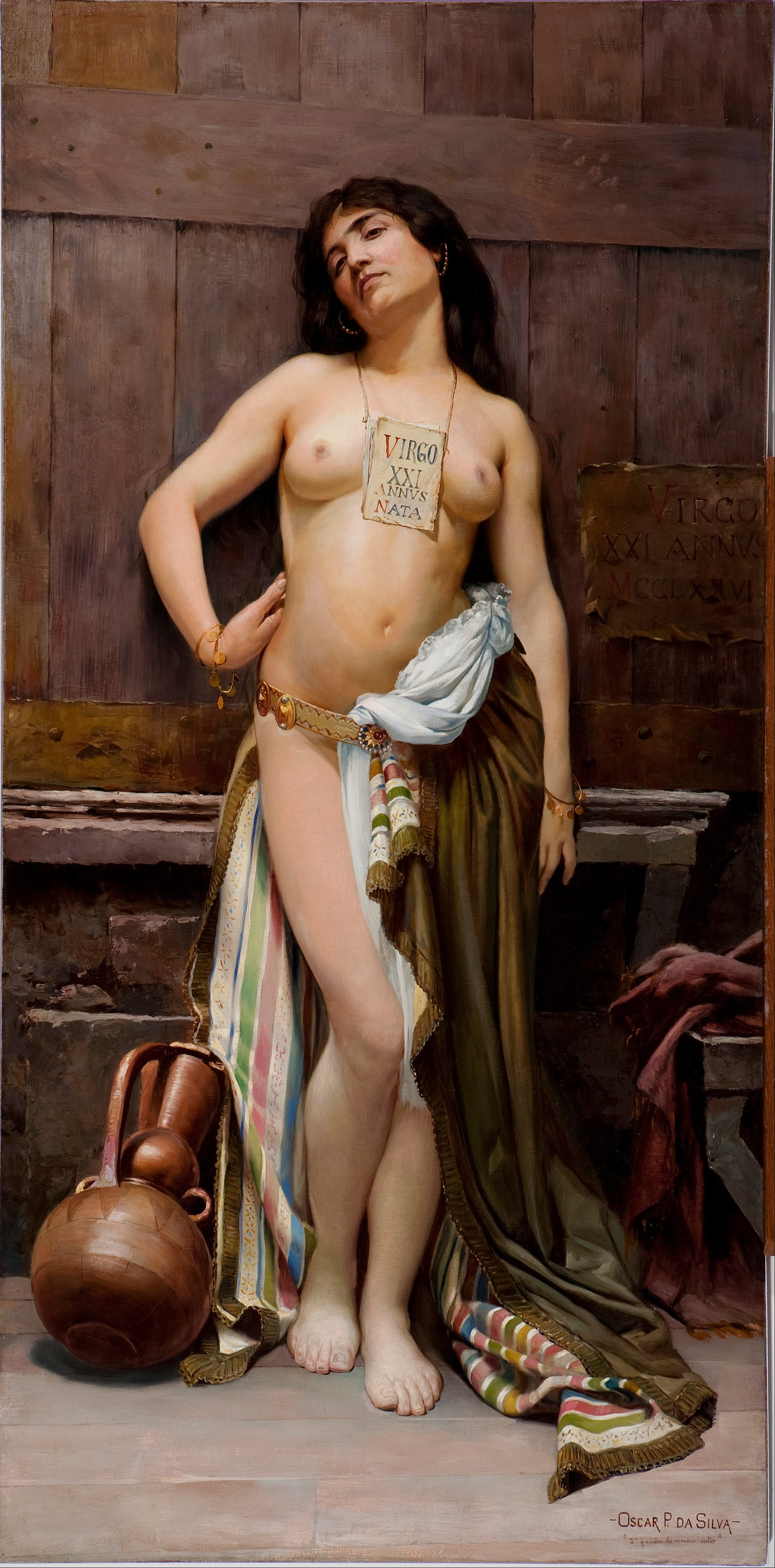
Oscar Pereira da Silva, Escrava Romana, c. 1894

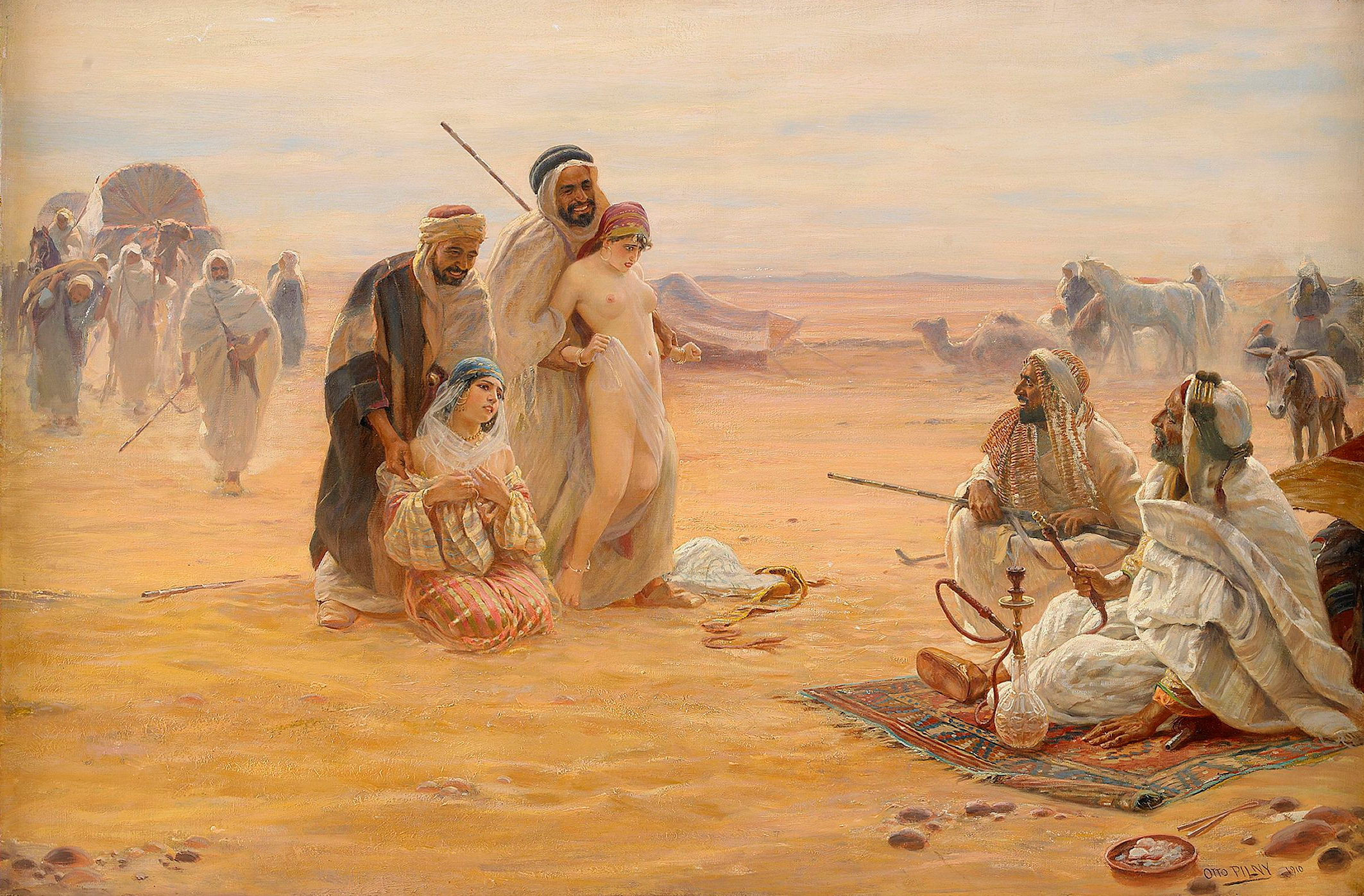
Otto Pilny, The Slave Market, 1910

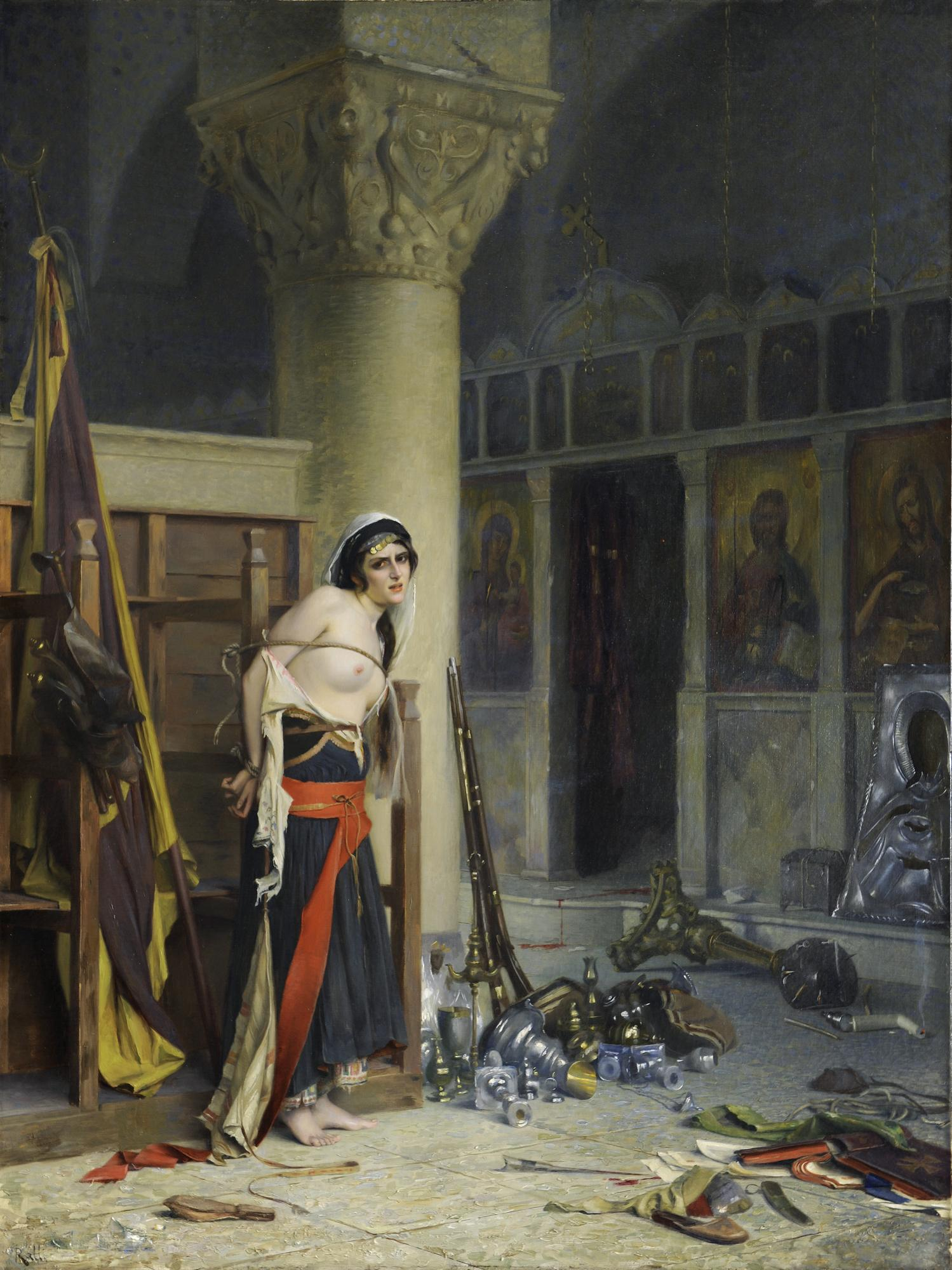
The Booty by Théodore Ralli c. 1905

== See also ==
- History of slavery in the Muslim world
- History of concubinage in the Muslim world
