= Miss Cicely Alexander =

Painting by James McNeill Whistler

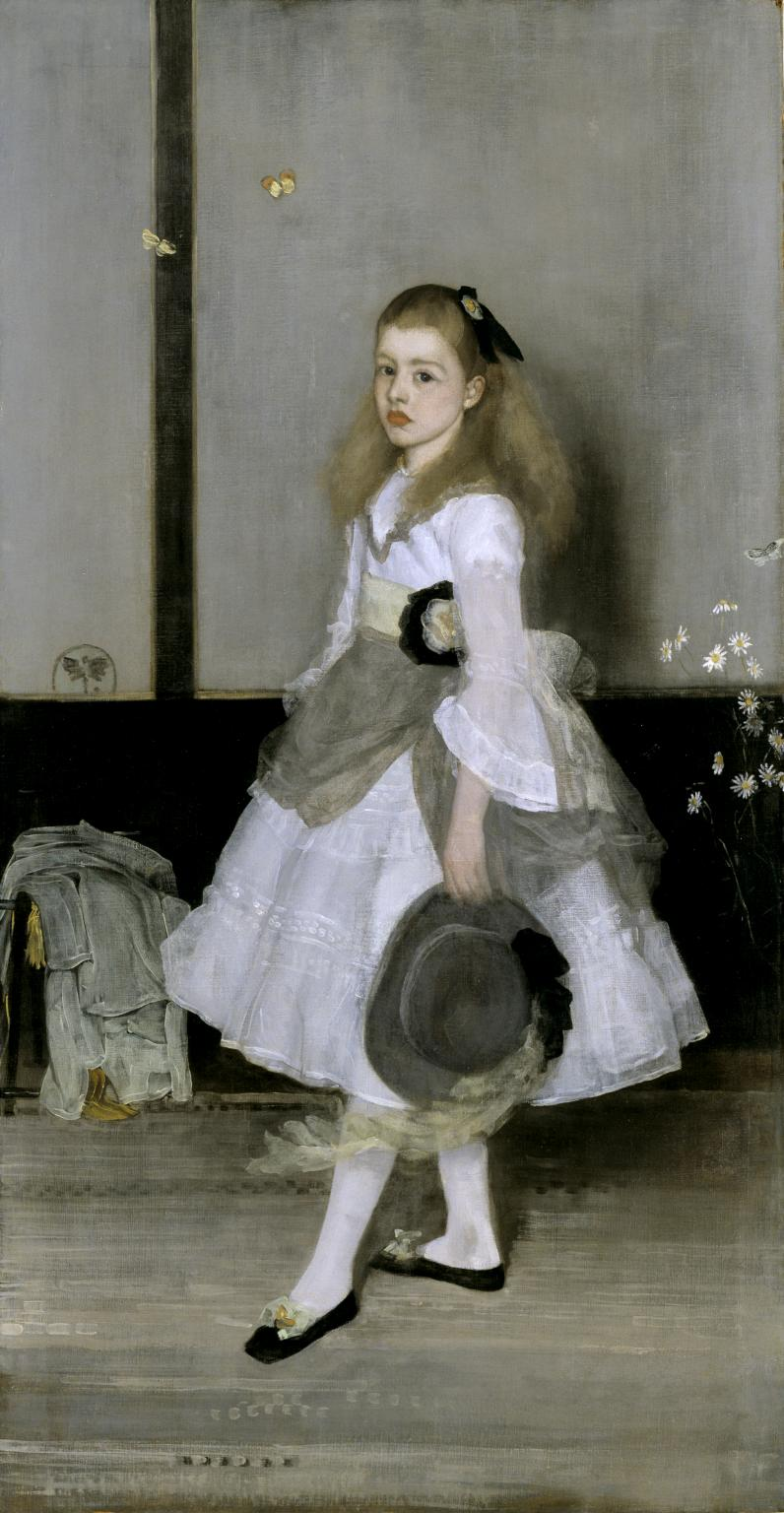
- Artist: James McNeill Whistler
- Year: 1872–4
- Type: Oil on canvas, portrait painting
- Dimensions: 97.8 cm × 190.2 cm (38.5 in × 74.9 in)
- Location: Tate Britain, London

Harmony in Grey and Green: Miss Cicely Alexander is a 1874 portrait painting by the American-born artist James McNeill Whistler. It depicts Cicely Alexander, the daughter of the London banker William Cleverly Alexander. William was impressed by Whistler's works, particularly Whistler's Mother which he had produced in 1871, and commissioned him to paint portraits of his daughters. He produced two paintings including this and one of her sister Agnes as well as sketches of a third sister Grace. Their younger sister Rachel Frances Alexander was not yet born. Whistler also advised on the decoration of the family's London home Aubrey House in the Aesthetic style.

Whistler likely began work in 1872 when Cicely was eight. The austere composition makes reference to the fashionable Japonisme and to Whistler's own theory of Tonalism. The portrait involved seventy separate sittings due to Whistler's methodical process. Her attitude inspired by the 1862 painting Lola de Valence by Édouard Manet. Both men shared an interest in the works of the Spanish Old Master Diego Velázquez, which they reflected in their own Victorian era paintings. It was first exhibited at the Flemish Gallery in Pall Mall which Whistler had rented. In 1884 it was also displayed at an exhibition in Brussels. The same year he also submitted it to the Salon of 1884 in Paris. The painting is now in the collection of the Tate Britain in Pimlico, which was bequeathed it in 1932.

== See also ==
- List of paintings by James McNeill Whistler

== Bibliography ==
- Merrill, Linda. After Whistler: The Artist and His Influence on American Painting. Yale University Press, 2003.
- Sutherland, Daniel E. Whistler: A Life for Art's Sake. Yale University Press, 2014.
- Tinterow, Gary & Lacambre, Geneviève. Manet/Velázquez: The French Taste for Spanish Painting. Metropolitan Museum of Art, 2003
