= Slave Market in Ancient Rome =

Painting by Jean-Léon Gérôme

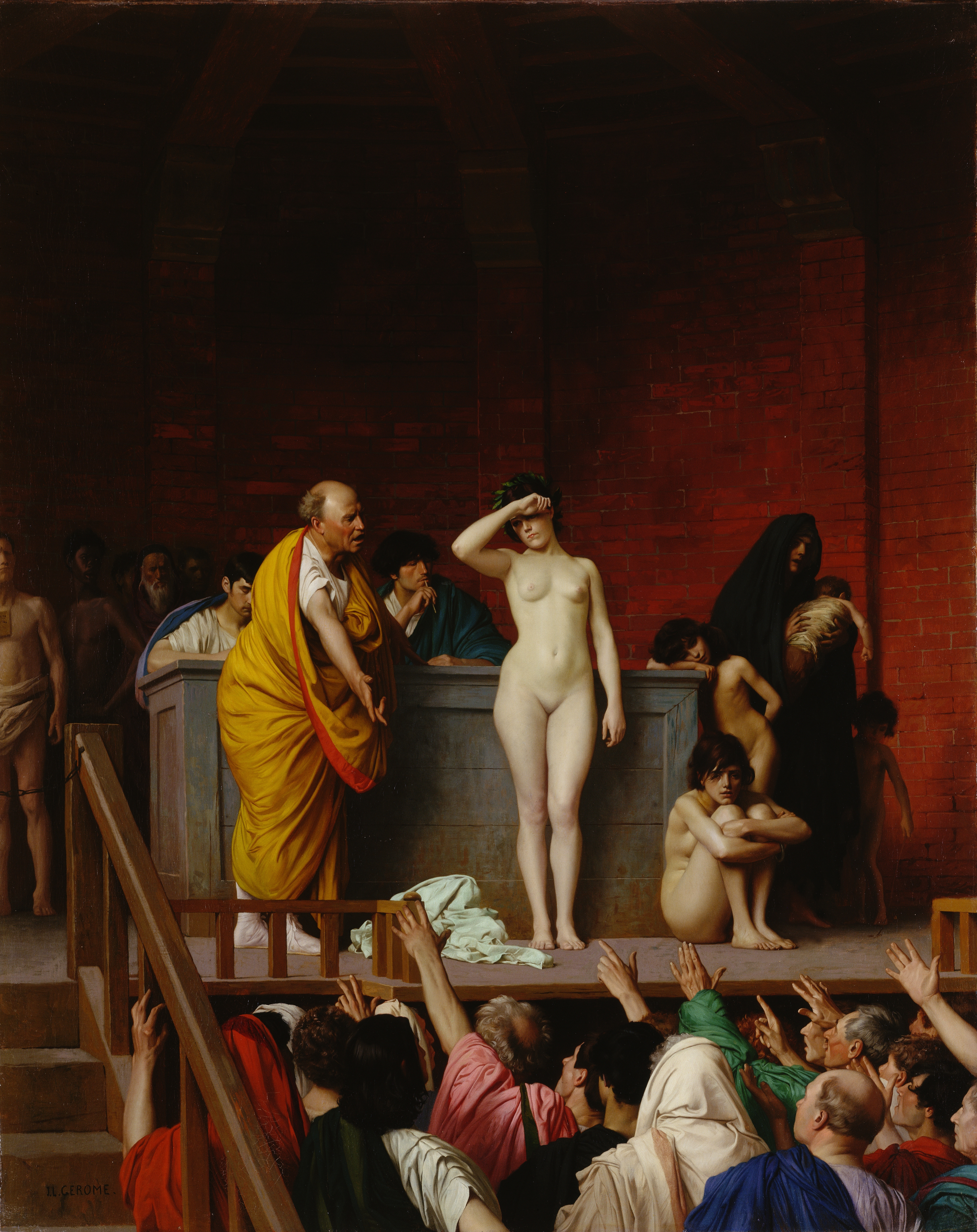
- Artist: Jean-Léon Gérôme
- Year: circa 1884
- Medium: Oil on canvas
- Dimensions: 92 cm × 74 cm (36 in × 29 in)
- Location: The State Hermitage Museum, Saint Petersburg, Russia

Slave Market in Ancient Rome is a painting of about 1884 by French artist Jean-Léon Gérôme, who was known for combining classical, romantic, and realistic elements.

== Description ==
It depicts an Ancient Roman slave auction in progress. At the center of a high dais is a completely nude woman having been recently undressed by the slave dealer situated to her right, who is displaying her to the crowd as they bid on her. The woman shields her eyes with her right hand due to the humiliating predicament of being publicly exposed in front of such a large crowd. Another nude young woman sits fearfully at the first woman's feet, covering her breasts with her legs in a protective pose. Behind her is an older clothed woman holding an infant, she is surrounded by two naked children who she is probably the mother of. Her face has a look of dread as she knows she is to be auctioned soon, most likely being separated from her children forever. Behind the auction booth, two men are keeping an account of the sales, with a row of enslaved men looking on from behind them. It is one of his six slave-market scenes set in either ancient Rome or 19th-century Istanbul that Gérôme painted during his career.

== In Relation to A Roman Slave Market ==
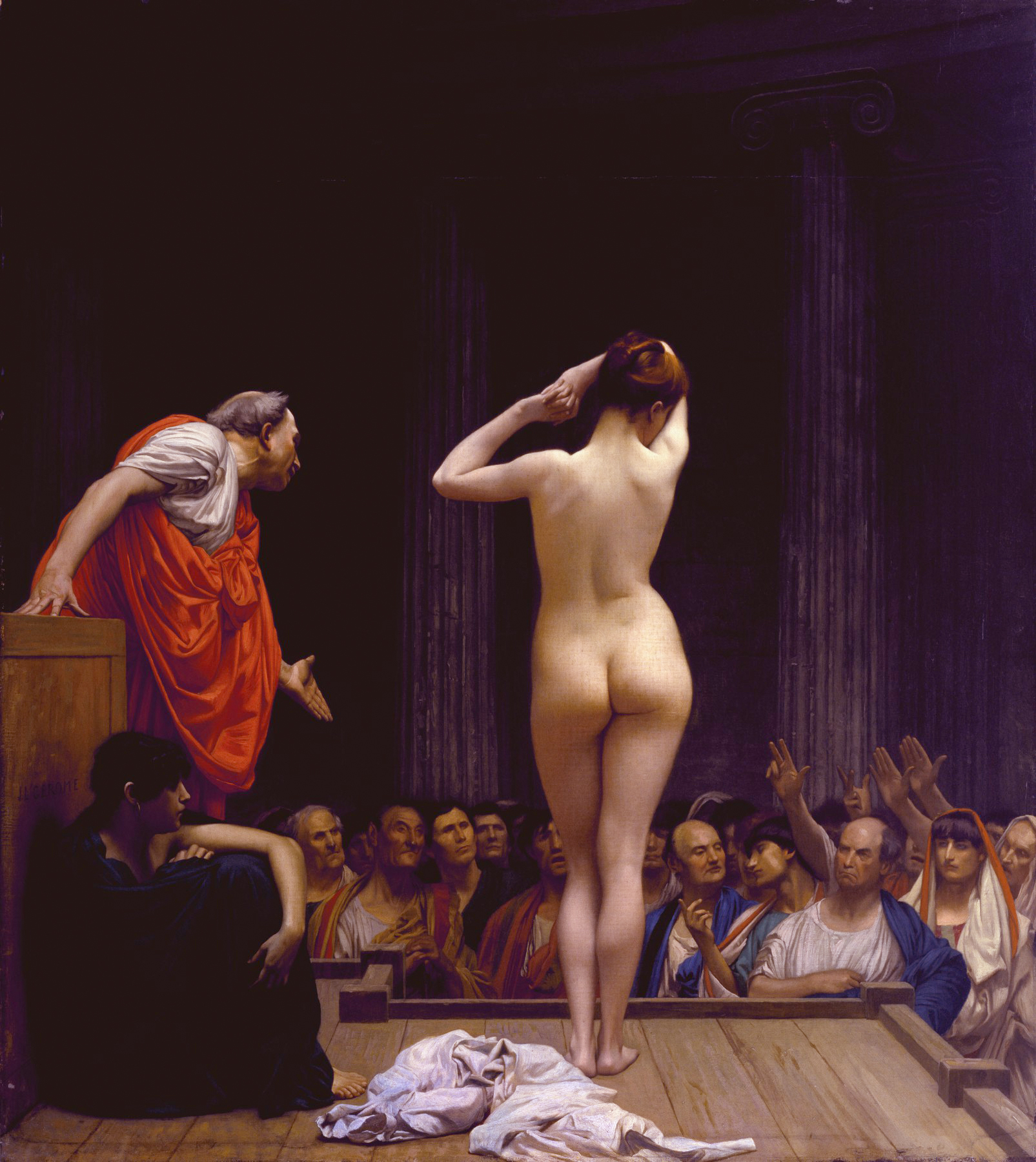
Jean Leon Gerome's A Roman Slave Market

The scheme and figures in this composition are more or less the reverse of his previous work, A Roman Slave Market, also completed in 1884. Both artworks were exhibited at the Salon of 1884.

== See also ==
- Slavery in Ancient Rome
- The Slave Market (Gérôme painting)
