= The Slave Market (Vernet) =

Painting by Horace Vernet

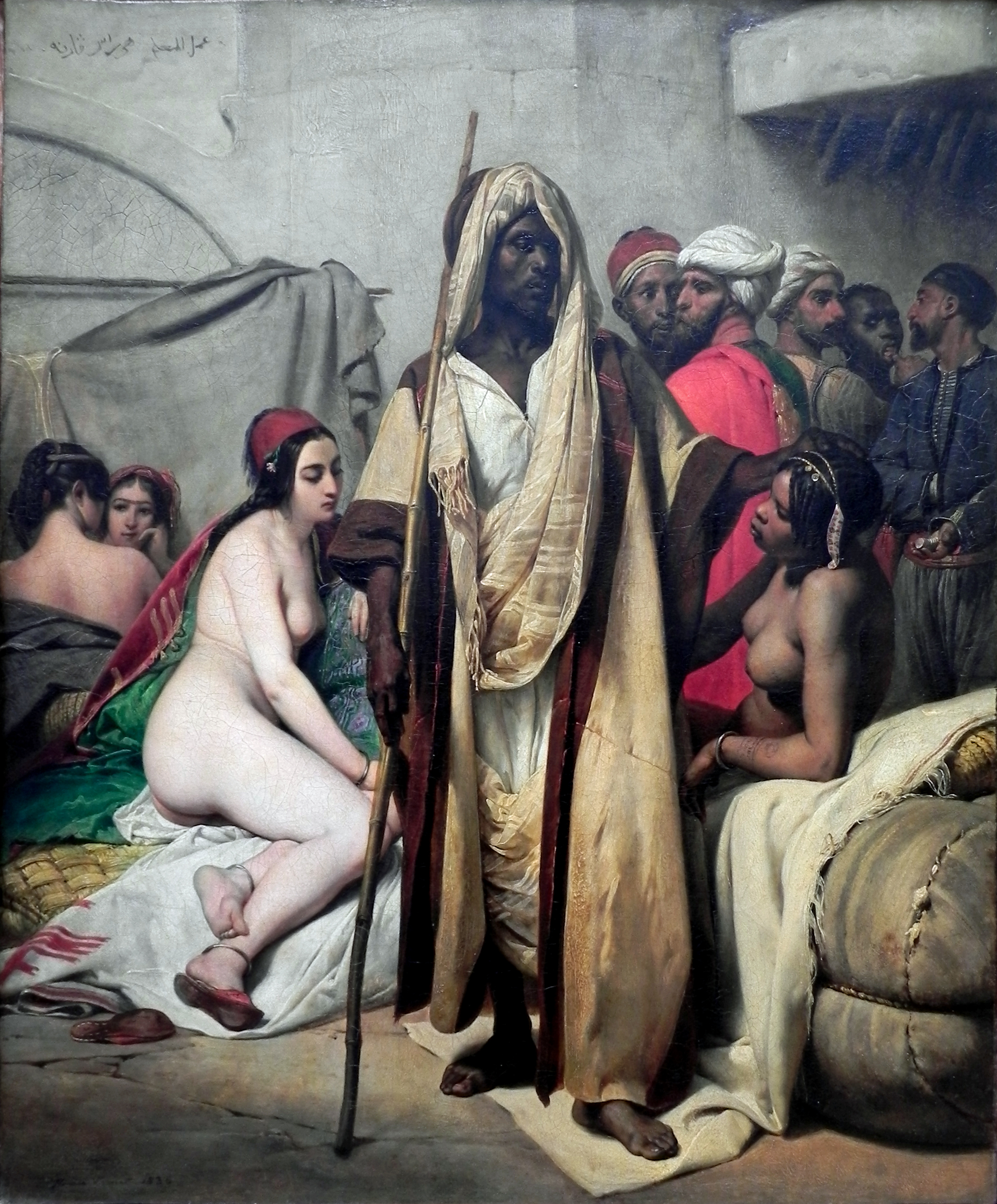
- Artist: Horace Vernet
- Year: 1836
- Type: Oil on canvas, genre painting
- Dimensions: 65 cm × 54 cm (26 in × 21 in)
- Location: Alte Nationalgalerie, Berlin

The Slave Market (French: Le Marché d'esclaves) is an 1836 genre painting by the French artist Horace Vernet. It depicts a slave market in the Middle East. Vernet produced a number of orientalist works following his visits to North Africa in the wake of the French Conquest of Algeria. Today the painting is in the collection of the Alte Nationalgalerie in Berlin.

== Bibliography ==
- Behdad, Ali & Gartlan, Luke. Photography's Orientalism: New Essays on Colonial Representation. Getty Publications, 2013.
- Harkett, Daniel & Hornstein, Katie (ed.) Horace Vernet and the Thresholds of Nineteenth-Century Visual Culture. Dartmouth College Press, 2017.
- Ruutz-Rees, Janet Emily. Horace Vernet. Scribner and Welford, 1880.
