= Whistler's Mother =

1871 painting by James McNeill Whistler

Arrangement in Grey and Black No. 1
- Artist: James McNeill Whistler
- Year: 1871
- Medium: Oil on canvas
- Movement: Realism
- Subject: Anna McNeill Whistler
- Dimensions: 144.3 cm × 162.4 cm (56.81 in × 63.94 in)
- Location: Musée d'Orsay, Paris

Arrangement in Grey and Black No. 1, best known under its colloquial name Whistler's Mother or Portrait of Artist's Mother, is an oil painting on canvas painted by the American-born painter James McNeill Whistler in 1871. The subject of the painting is Whistler's mother, Anna McNeill Whistler. The painting is 56.81 by 63.94 inches (1,443 mm × 1,624 mm), displayed in a frame of Whistler's own design. It is now in the Musée d'Orsay in Paris, having been bought by the French state in 1891. It is one of the most famous works by an American artist outside the United States, and has been variously described as an American icon and a Victorian Mona Lisa.

== History ==
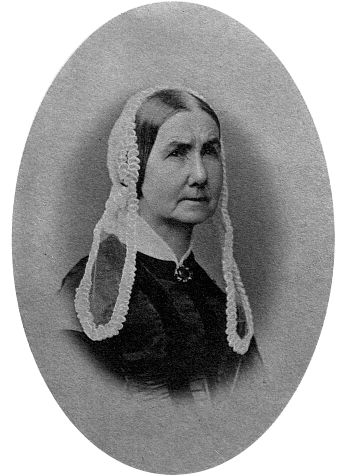
Anna Whistler circa 1850s

Anna McNeill Whistler posed for the painting while living in London with her son at 96 Cheyne Walk, Chelsea.

Several unverifiable stories relate to the painting of the work; one is that Anna Whistler acted as a replacement for another model who could not make the appointment. Whistler originally envisioned painting the model standing up. However, his mother was too uncomfortable to pose standing for an extended period.

The work was shown at the 104th Exhibition of the Royal Academy of Art in London (1872), after coming within a hair's breadth of rejection by the academy. This episode worsened the rift between Whistler and the British art world; Arrangement was the last painting he submitted for the academy's approval (although his etching of Old Putney Bridge was exhibited there in 1879). Vol. VIII of The Royal Academy of Arts: A Complete Dictionary of Contributors and their work from its foundation in 1769 to 1904 (by Algernon Graves, F.S.A., London 1906) lists the 1872 exhibit as no. 941, "Arrangement in Grey and Black: Portrait of the Painter's mother", and gives Whistler's address as The White House, Chelsea Embankment.

The sensibilities of a Victorian era viewing audience would not accept what was a portrait exhibited as an "arrangement", hence the addition of the explanatory title Portrait of the Painter's mother. From this, the work acquired its enduring nickname of simply Whistler's Mother. After Thomas Carlyle viewed the painting, he agreed to sit for a similar composition, this one titled Arrangement in Grey and Black, No. 2. Thus the previous painting became known as Arrangement in Grey and Black, No. 1.

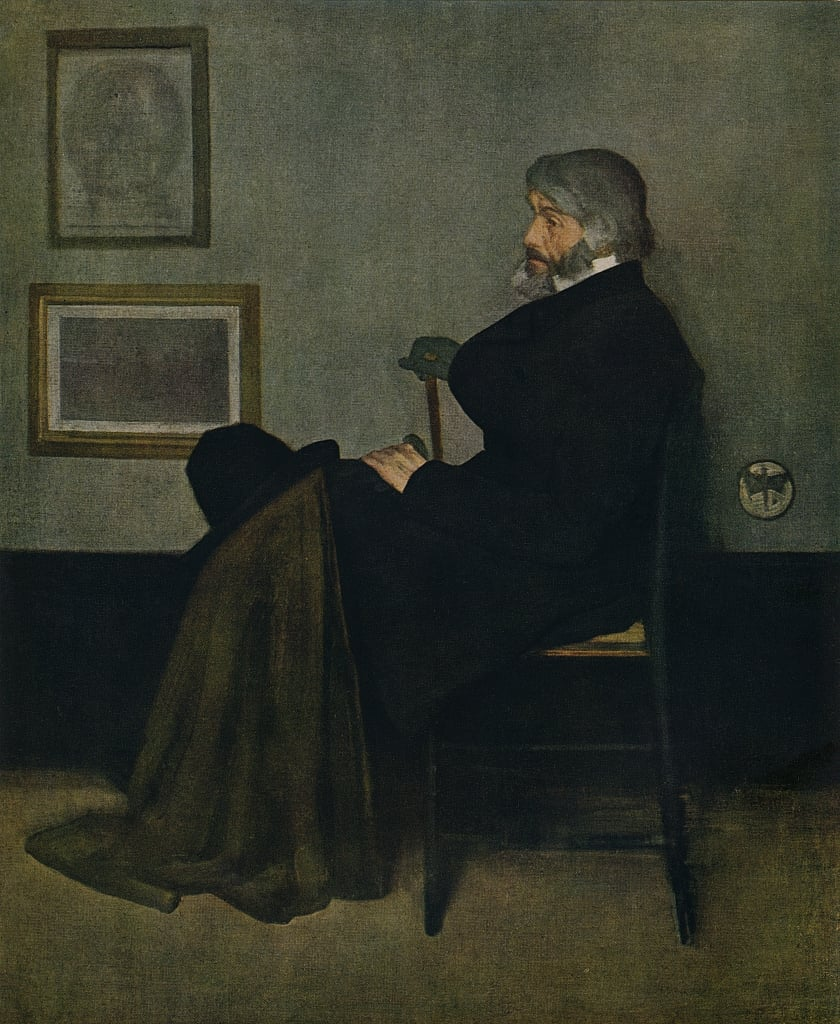
Arrangement in Grey and Black No. 2 (Thomas Carlyle), 1872–1873

Watercolour by Walter Greaves of Whistler in his studio, at work on the painting

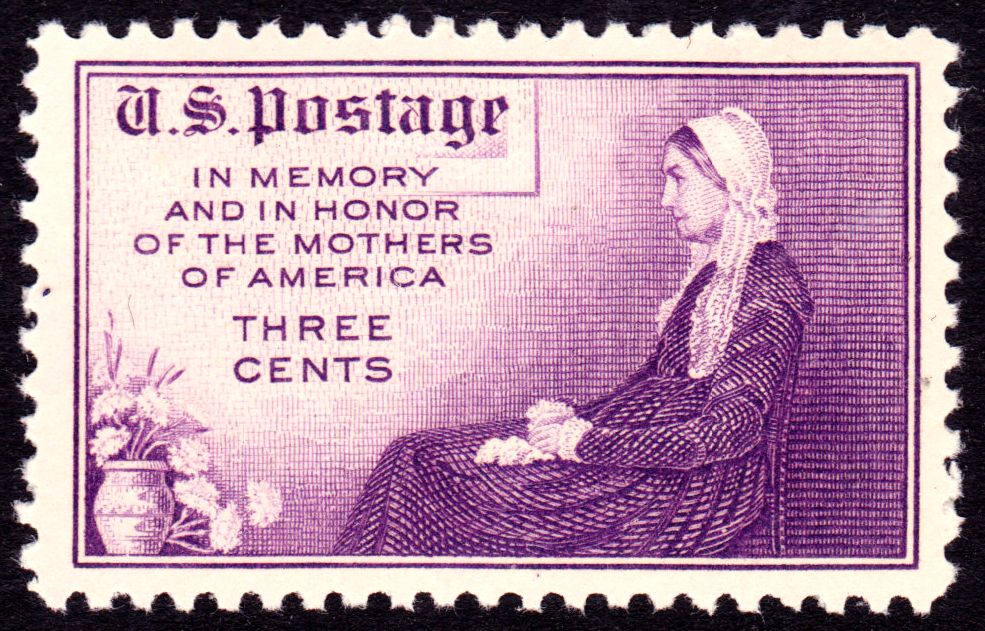
1934 U.S. postage stamp

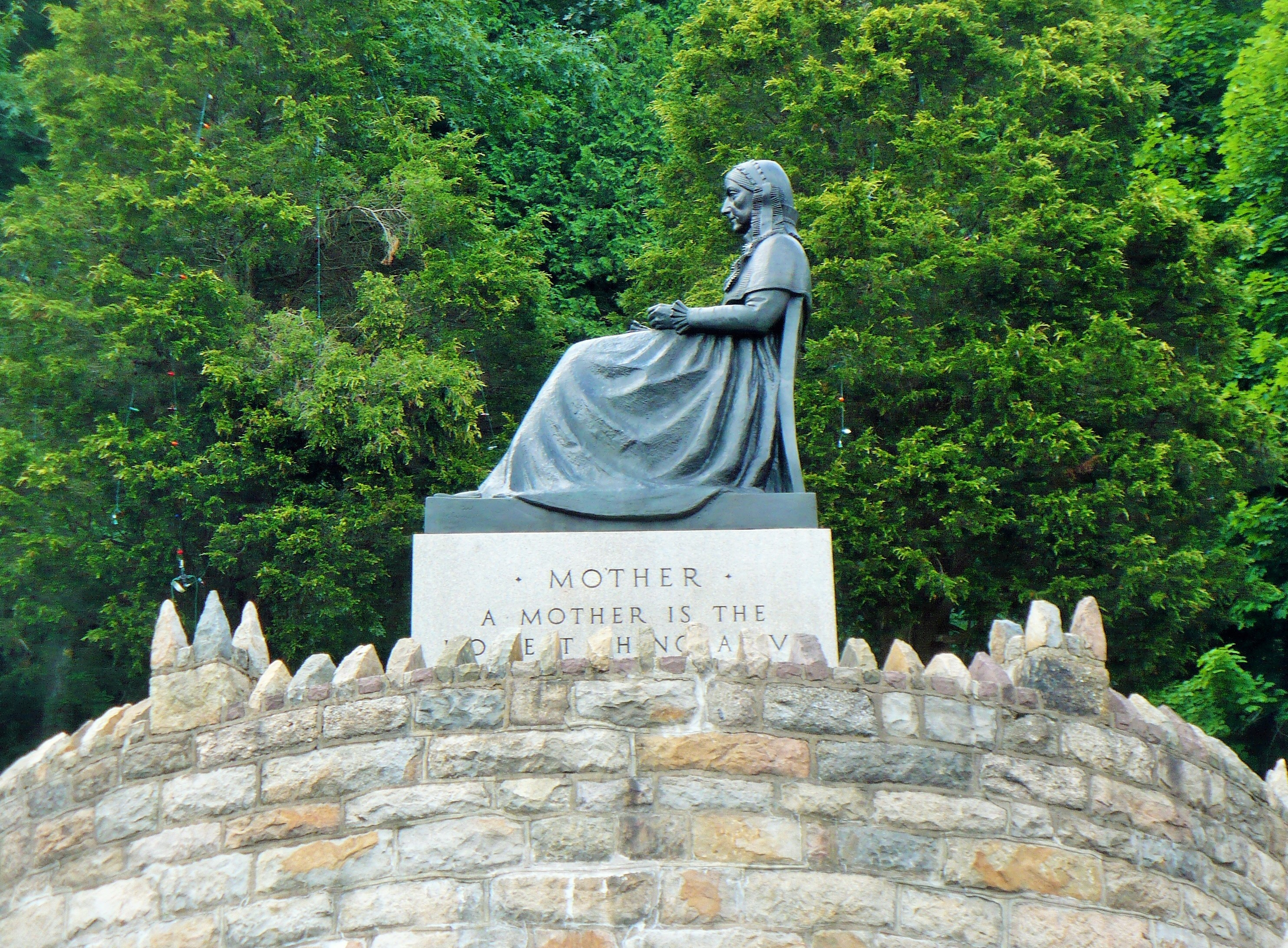
Mothers' Memorial, Ashland, Pennsylvania

In a letter written by Whistler dated Sept 4. 1881, it mentions that a 'Messrs Dickinson' (Frame makers) will "send tomorrow morning for the Portrait of my Mother which you are good enough to allow to go to the Exhibition in Philadelphia.". Anna Lea Merritt (who lived next door to him at the time) was asked by the Pennsylvania Academy of Fine Arts to persuade Whistler to send a picture to the exhibition.

Whistler eventually pawned the painting, which was ultimately acquired in 1891 by Paris's Musée du Luxembourg. Whistler's works, including this one, had attracted several imitators. Numerous similarly posed and restricted-colour palette paintings soon appeared, particularly by American expatriate painters. For Whistler, having one of his paintings displayed in a major museum helped attract wealthy patrons. In December 1884, Whistler wrote:

Just think—to go and look at one's own picture hanging on the walls of Luxembourg—remembering how it had been treated in England—to be met everywhere with deference and respect...and to know that all this is ... a tremendous slap in the face to the Academy and the rest! Really it is like a dream.

As a proponent of "art for art's sake", Whistler professed to be perplexed and annoyed by the insistence of others upon viewing his work as a "portrait". In his 1890 book The Gentle Art of Making Enemies, he wrote:

Take the picture of my mother, exhibited at the Royal Academy as an "Arrangement in Grey and Black." Now that is what it is. To me it is interesting as a picture of my mother; but what can or ought the public to care about the identity of the portrait?

Both Whistler's Mother and Thomas Carlyle were engraved by the English engraver Richard Josey. The image has been used since the Victorian era as an icon for motherhood, affection for parents, and "family values" in general, especially in the United States. For example, in 1934, the U.S. Post Office Department issued a stamp engraved with the portrait detail from Whistler's Mother, bearing the slogan "In memory and in honor of the mothers of America." In the Borough of Ashland, Pennsylvania, an eight-foot-high statue based on the painting was erected as a tribute to mothers by the Ashland Boys' Association in 1938, during the Great Depression.

In summing up the painting's influence, art historian Martha Tedeschi said:

Whistler's Mother, Wood's American Gothic, Leonardo da Vinci's Mona Lisa and Edvard Munch's The Scream have all achieved something that most paintings—regardless of their art historical importance, beauty, or monetary value—have not: they communicate a specific meaning almost immediately to almost every viewer. These few works have successfully made the transition from the elite realm of the museum visitor to the enormous venue of popular culture.

== Exhibitions in America ==
Whistler's Mother has been exhibited several times in the United States, notably at the Century of Progress world's fair in Chicago in 1933–34. It was shown at the Atlanta Art Association in the fall of 1962, the National Gallery of Art in 1994, and the Detroit Institute of Arts in 2004. It was exhibited at the Boston Museum of Fine Arts in 1983 in an exhibition called A New World: Masterpieces of American Painting 1760–1910.

From May 22 to September 6, 2010, it was shown at the M. H. de Young Memorial Museum in San Francisco. The painting was exhibited at the Norton Simon Museum in Pasadena, California, from March 27 to June 22, 2015, at the Colby College Museum of Art in Maine, and then the Freer Gallery of Art in Washington, D.C. in 2016 . It was shown at the Art Institute of Chicago from March 4 to May 21, 2017. From 10 June to 29 October 2023, it was on display at the Philadelphia Museum of Art.

== In popular culture ==
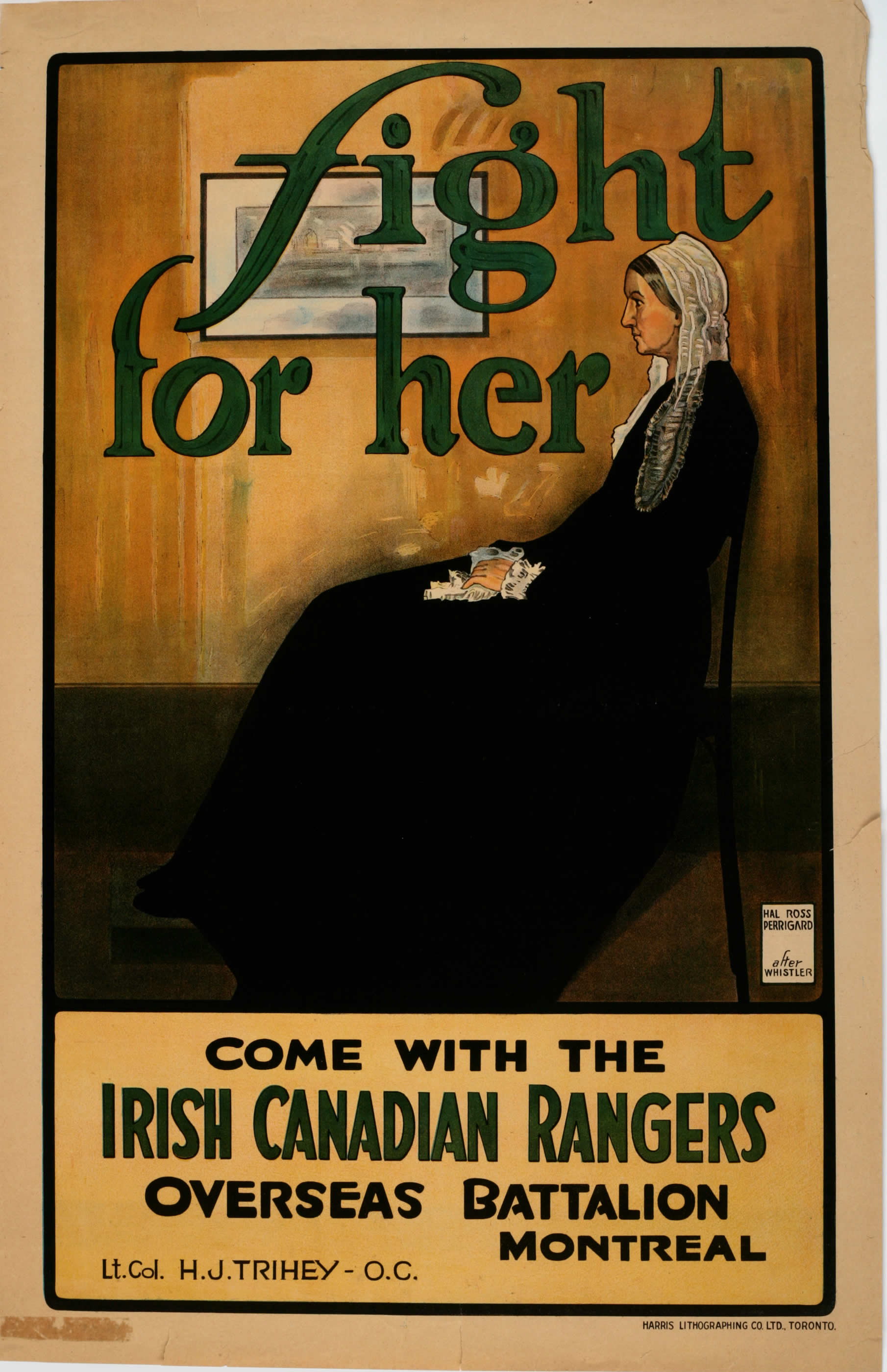
Fight for Her, World War I recruitment poster from Canada, urging men to enlist with the Irish Canadian Rangers and to fight for the women in their lives. It appeals to notions of motherhood and "family values" that were popular at the time, and often attributed to this painting.

The painting has been featured or mentioned in numerous works of fiction and within pop culture. These include films such as Sing and Like It (1934), The Secret Life of Walter Mitty (1947), the Donald Duck shorts Early to Bed (1941), Donald's Diary (1954) & No Hunting (1955), The Fortune Cookie (1966), The Rocky Horror Picture Show (1975), Babette's Feast (1986), The Naked Gun 2½: The Smell of Fear (1991), Bean (1997), The Tigger Movie (2000), Looney Tunes: Back in Action (2003), I Am Legend (2007), and Cloudy with a Chance of Meatballs 2 (2013).

It has been mentioned in television episodes of The Simpsons ("Rosebud", "The Trouble with Trillions", and "The Burns and the Bees").

"Whistler's Mother" is the twentieth episode of the first season of the American television satirical sitcom Arrested Development (2004).

The painting is mentioned in Vladimir Nabokov's 1955 novel Lolita.

The painting is central to the plot of the 1997 comedy film Bean, in which Mr. Bean accidentally defaces it during its repatriation to the United States and secretly replaces it with a poster.

Actor Hurd Hatfield toured internationally several times with the play Son of Whistler's Mother by playwright Maggie Williams.

Between 1959 and 2021, the Douglas A-26 Invader aircraft serial number 41-39401, named Whistler's Mother and with a reproduction of the painting on its nose, was flown and displayed.

=== In music ===
Whistler, and particularly this painting, had a profound effect on Claude Debussy, a contemporary French composer. In 1894, Debussy wrote to violinist Eugène Ysaÿe describing his Nocturnes as "an experiment in the different combinations that can be obtained from one color – what a study in grey would be in painting." Whether Debussy used the term color to refer to orchestration or harmony, critics have observed "shades" of a particular sound quality in his music.

In the popular 1934 standard "You're the Top" by Cole Porter the painting is alluded to in the line, "You're Whistler's mama".

The cover for Ray Stevens 1997 album Hum It features a parody of the painting where Ray wears a morning dress and white bonnet.

In the 1938 Warner Bros. Pictures short "Have You Got Any Castles?", Whistler's Mother can be seen whistling on the cover of book titled "Great Works of Art".

== See also ==
- List of paintings by James McNeill Whistler
- Zephaniah Kingsley, uncle
