= A Roman Slave Market =

Painting by Jean-Léon Gérôme

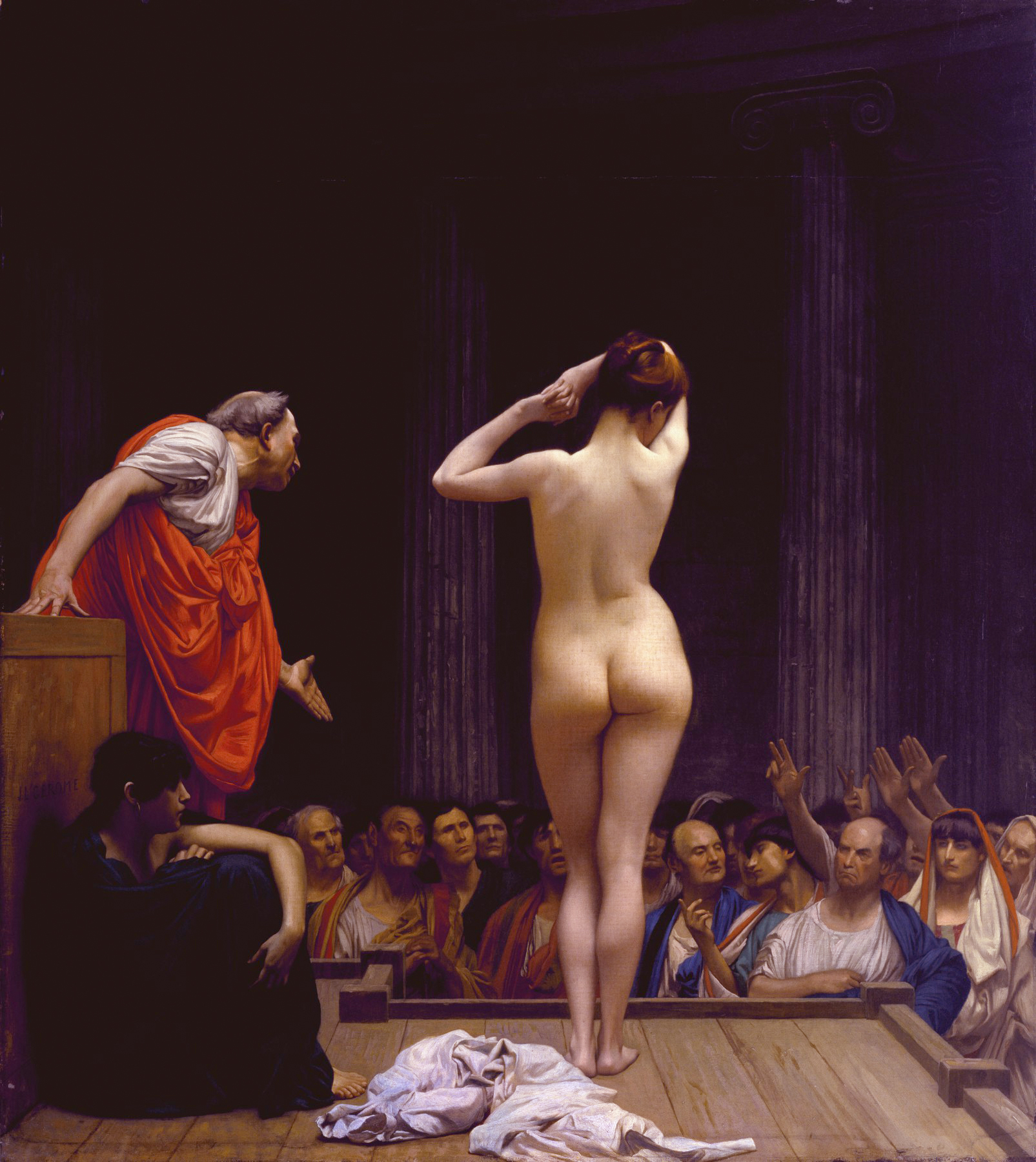
- Artist: Jean-Léon Gérôme
- Year: 1884
- Medium: Oil on panel, history painting
- Dimensions: 64.1 cm × 56.9 cm (25.2 in × 22.4 in)
- Location: Walters Art Museum, Baltimore

A Roman Slave Market (French: Marché romain aux esclaves) is an 1884 history painting by the French artist Jean-Léon Gérôme. It depicts a slave auction in Ancient Rome. A group of mean-looking slave traders are bidding for a humiliated nude young woman, who shields her eyes with her arm. Her stance was one of several produced by the artist inspired by the Ancient Greek courtesan Phryne. It may have been influenced by the idea of the Circassian woman, a common theme in the nineteenth century due to the Russian Conquest of Circassia. Gérôme was one of the most prominent painters of the academic style, known for his Orientalist and historical pictures. The painting was displayed at the Salon of 1884 in Paris. It is now in the collection of the Walters Art Museum in Baltimore, having been purchased in 1917.

== Bibliography ==
- Allan, Scott & Morton, Mary G. Reconsidering Gérôme. Getty Publications, 2010.
- Ackerman, Gerald M. The Life and Work of Jean-Léon Gérôme. Sotheby's Publications, 1986.
- Kern, Stephen. Eyes of Love: The Gaze in English and French Paintings and Novels, 1840–1900. Reaction Books, 1996.
