= Estlin =

Estlin may refer to:

== Places ==
- Estlin, Saskatchewan, hamlet in Saskatchewan, Canada

== People ==
- John Prior Estlin (1747–1817), English Unitarian minister
- John Bishop Estlin (1785–1855), English ophthalmic surgeon
- Mary Estlin (1820–1902), British abolitionist
- Peter Estlin (born 1961), alderman of the City of London Corporation
