= 1863 in the United Kingdom =

Events from the year 1863 in the United Kingdom.

== Incumbents ==
- Monarch – Victoria
- Prime Minister – Henry John Temple, 3rd Viscount Palmerston (Liberal)

== Events ==
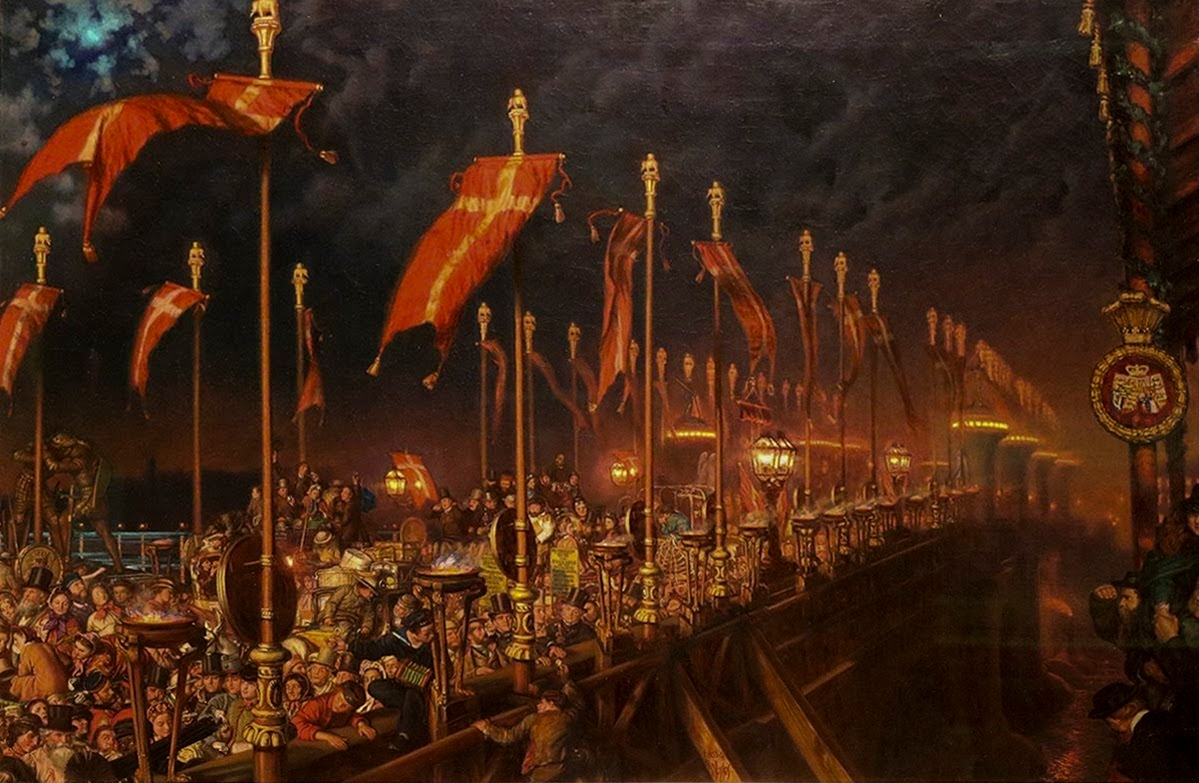
London Bridge on the Night of the Marriage of the Prince and Princess of Wales by William Holman Hunt.

- 8 January – Yorkshire County Cricket Club is founded at the Adelphi Hotel in Sheffield.
- 10 January – the first section of the London Underground Railway opens to the public (Paddington to Farringdon Street).
- 7 February – HMS Orpheus sinks attempting to enter Manukau Harbour in New Zealand with the loss of 189 lives.
- 25 February – William Thomson enthroned as Archbishop of York.
- 2 March – Clapham Junction railway station opens in London.
- 10 March – marriage of Albert Edward, Prince of Wales (later Edward VII) to Princess Alexandra of Denmark (later Queen Alexandra) at St George's Chapel, Windsor Castle.
- Before 30 March – the government rejects the Greek Assembly's choice of The Prince Alfred as the successor to the deposed Otto of Greece.
- 27 May – Broadmoor Criminal Lunatic Asylum at Crowthorne receives its first patients.
- 4 June – the Eton Boating Song is first performed.
- 15–17 August – Bombardment of Kagoshima: Royal Navy bombards the town of Kagoshima in Japan in retribution after the Namamugi Incident of 1862.
- 20 August – Ladies' London Emancipation Society established as an abolitionist group in support of the Union (American Civil War) by Clementia Taylor at Aubrey House.
- 23 October – Ffestiniog Railway in North Wales introduces steam locomotives into general service, the first time this has been done anywhere in the world on a public railway of such a narrow gauge (2 feet (61 cm)).
- 26 October – the Football Association is founded at the Freemasons' Tavern in Long Acre, London.
- 4–7 November – the Chōshū Five, having left Japan secretly, arrive in England to study at University College London, part of the ending of sakoku.
- 25 November – the case of Byrne v Boadle introduces the doctrine of res ipsa loquitur into English tort law.
- 8 December – the Football Association laws are agreed.
- 10 December – Tom King, Heavyweight Champion of England, wins the last major bare-knuckle boxing match in England, against the American John C. Heenan at Wadhurst, East Sussex.
- 19 December
  - Linoleum patented.
  - The first game is played under the new Football Association rules at Mortlake between Ebenezer Morley's Barnes Club and Richmond F.C., ending in a goalless draw.

=== Undated ===
- Beginning of Second Anglo-Ashanti War (1863–1864).
- A scarlet fever epidemic causes over 30,000 deaths.
- Richard Owen publishes the first description of a fossilised bird, Archaeopteryx, from the specimen in London's British Museum.
- Supposed formation of Stoke City F.C. as Stoke Rovers.

== Publications ==
- Henry Walter Bates's work The Naturalist on the River Amazons.
- Charles Kingsley's children's novel The Water Babies (complete in book form).
- Charles Lyell's work Geological Evidences of the Antiquity of Man, endorsing the views of Charles Darwin.
- Mrs Oliphant's novel Salem Chapel, first of The Chronicles of Carlingford (in book form).
- Ouida's novel Held in Bondage.

== Births ==
- 17 January – David Lloyd George, Prime Minister (died 1945)
- 11 March – Andrew Stoddart, sportsman (died 1915)
- 17 March - Olivia Shakespear, novelist, playwright and patron of the arts (died 1938)
- 27 March – Henry Royce, automobile pioneer (died 1933)
- 5 April – Princess Victoria of Hesse and by Rhine, member of the Royal Family (died 1950)
- 18 April – Linton Hope, Olympic yachtsman and yacht and aircraft designer (died 1920)
- 15 May – Frank Hornby, inventor, businessman and politician (died 1936)
- 17 May – Charles Robert Ashbee, designer (died 1942)
- 27 May – Arthur Mold, cricketer (died 1921)
- 13 June – Lucy, Lady Duff-Gordon, fashion designer (died 1942)
- 19 June – John Goodall, footballer (died 1942)
- 6 July – Reginald McKenna, Chancellor of the Exchequer 1915–1916 (died 1943)
- 21 July – C. Aubrey Smith, actor and cricketer (died 1948 in Beverly Hills)
- 13 September – Arthur Henderson, politician, recipient of the Nobel Peace Prize (died 1935)
- 16 October – Austen Chamberlain, statesman, recipient of the Nobel Peace Prize (died 1937)
- 17 December – Violet Bland, suffragette (died 1940)
- 20 December – Margaret Greville, née Anderson, society hostess and philanthropist (died 1942)

== Deaths ==
- 6 January – Harriet Gouldsmith, landscape painter and etcher (born 1787)
- 9 March – John Gully, sportsman and politician (born 1783)
- 13 April – Sir George Cornewall Lewis, statesman (born 1806)
- 14 August – Colin Campbell, 1st Baron Clyde, soldier (born 1792)
- 24 June – Sir George Elliot, admiral (born 1784)
- 17 September – Charles Robert Cockerell, architect, archaeologist and writer (born 1788)
- 26 September – Frederick William Faber, poet, hymnodist, theologian and Catholic convert (born 1814)
- 6 October – Frances Milton Trollope, novelist and writer (born 1779)
- 8 October – Richard Whately, theologian and archbishop (born 1787)
- 28 October – William Cubitt, building and civil engineering contractor and politician (born 1791)
- 24 December – William Makepeace Thackeray, novelist (born 1811)
- 29 December – Joseph John Scoles, Catholic architect (born 1798)
