= Jane Taylour =

Scottish suffragist and women's movement campaigner

Jane E. Taylour
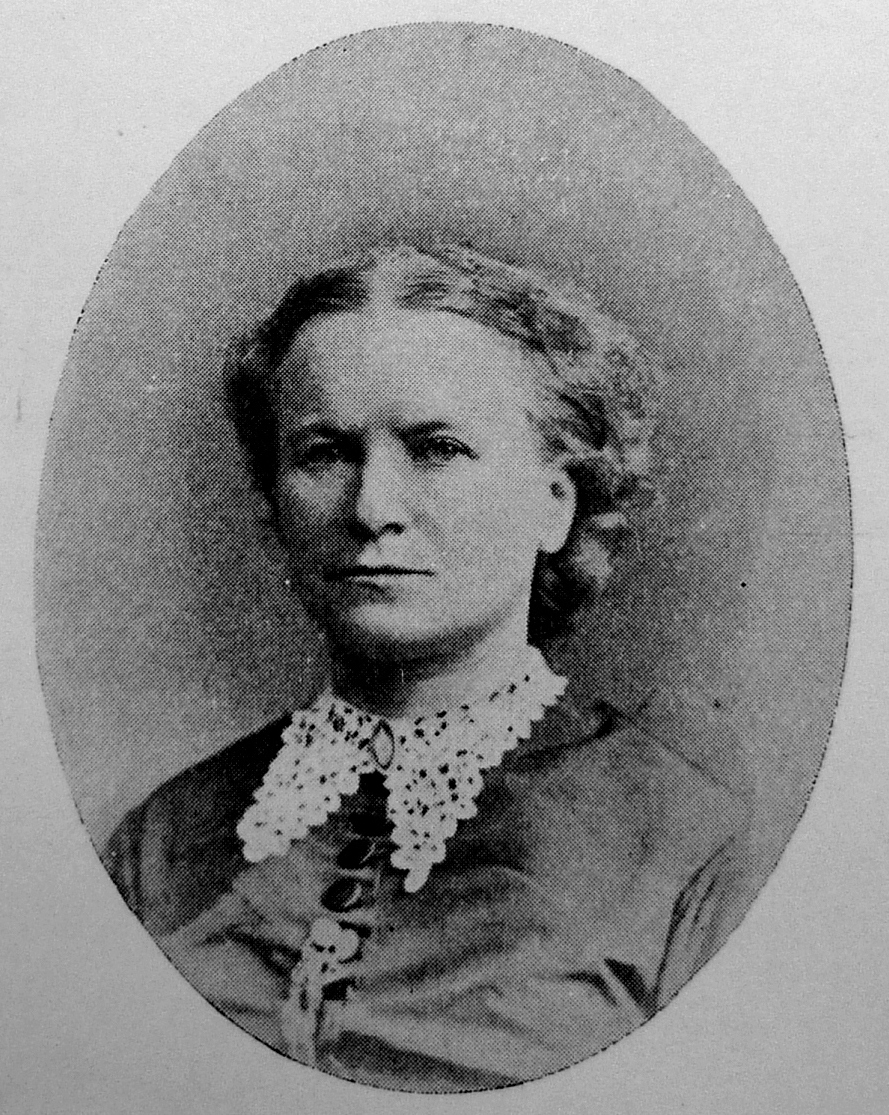
- Jane Taylour, 1871
- Born: 1827; Stranraer, Scotland
- Died: 1905 (aged 77–78); Saffron Walden, England
- Known for: Campaigner for women's suffrage

Jane E. Taylour (born c.1827 – died 1905) was a Scottish suffragist and women's movement campaigner, and one of the first women to give lectures in public. She travelled around Scotland and northern England as a suffrage lecturer, and was a key figure in spreading the message of women's suffrage throughout Scotland and inspiring others to join the National Society for Women's Suffrage.

== Life ==
Taylour was born in 1827 or 1828, in Belmont, Stranraer, Scotland, to Maria Angus and Nathaniel Taylor. She lived in Balfour. In 1861 she moved to Saffron Walden in Essex, where in 1901 she was recorded as living with Rachel P. Robson. Her income was probably inherited from her parents' estate in Jamaica, which included enslaved people; income which enabled her to cover the cost of travelling for the National Society for Women's Suffrage.

Taylour died in Saffron Walden on 25 February 1905. She was interred in the Society of Friends' burial ground.

== Campaigning for women's suffrage ==
Jane Taylour addressed the general public on the topic of women's suffrage in London, the North-East of England and in Scotland.

In 1869 Clementia Taylor asked Taylour to undertake a lecture tour, and from 1870 she gave public lectures throughout Scotland and north-east England campaigning for women's equality in education, employment and suffrage.

Within a year, Taylour had spoken in a voluntary capacity at 41 public meetings, as stated by Priscilla Bright McLaren at a London women's suffrage conference. These meetings were chaired by local magistrates, county sheriffs, clergy or influential men, and the outcomes were petitions to Parliament for women's votes for women.

Taylour sent in a petition in favour of Jacob Bright's Bill to remove women's electoral disabilities. She was described by women's rights activist Clementia Taylor as "the energetic little woman from Stranraer". Taylour did not believe that women were aiming to compete with men, but was aware that women could be exploited by 'wicked and unprincipled men' for example by losing their rights upon marriage. She said:

We do not want to usurp anything, or do anything unseemly or out of order, but to do our proper part in helping on the world's reform – helping with a woman's power, in a woman's way, with all that is wise, elevating, humane and holy.

Her talk at Kirkwall was so convincing that the chairperson, Provost Bain whose belief that parliament would look after women's interests without their enfranchisement, was 'considerably shaken' as he said when he thanked Taylour for the 'tact, eloquence, and singularly lucid manner in which she has advanced the claims of her sex.'

By 1873 she had delivered over 150 lectures in Scotland. Women's suffrage committees were formed in the Highlands and Moray towns of Tain, Dingwall, Forres, Elgin, Banff, Invergordon, Nairn and Dunkeld as a result of Taylour and McLaren's campaigns.

In one of her speeches, in Edinburgh in 1873, Taylour was putting forward the suffragists' case using

the argument of simple justice; the evidence that women had voted in a greater proportion than men in the English municipal elections in 1872 and voted in School Board elections; the franchise, attached to property, constitutionally should include women as taxpayers; the argument of lack of education did not prevent illiterate men from having the vote, and in any case the franchise was based on property; women, in a country ruled by a queen, should not be prohibited from public life; religious objections depended on narrow interpretations of Christian principles. Taylour’s lecture was followed by a resolution which emphasised that taxation was the basis of representation."

=== Lecture tour impact ===
She was accompanied on some of her lecture tours in Scotland by fellow campaigners Mary Hill Burton and Agnes McLaren. McLaren and Taylour travelled to the north of Scotland because "everything that could be done in Edinburgh had been done", as members of the Edinburgh National Society for Women's Suffrage and county members had voted and petitioned, and the Town Council had petitioned in favour of votes for women.

The meetings were popular, and in some cases people had to be turned away. Taylour's lectures were given extensive media coverage; The Orkney Herald gave her lectures in Orkney full coverage and reproduced her speeches in full, and her speech in Lerwick in Shetland on 12 September 1873 was fully reported in The Shetland Times. Her arguments were based on logic statements: “Firstly, the ladies claim the right to the electoral suffrage as it is consistent and logical; secondly, as taxes can only be levied by Parliament, elected by the tax-payers, we hold it unconstitutional to impose a barrier on [tax-paying] women.”

The Women's Suffrage Journal commented about one of her lectures that "Miss Taylour has all the requisites of a public lecturer. Her composition is chaste and elegant, her voice distinct and agreeable, and her manner attractive and graceful".

Taylour delivered a number of lectures in Gainsborough, Lincolnshire. On 12 March 1885 she was one of several speakers at the Temperance Hall, along with Florence Balgarnie, Jessie Tod, and Ann Radford McCormick. She returned two years later on 18 January 1887 to give a lecture on allowing women greater political and social equality with men, and returned to Gainsborough again on 31 May 1885 on women and politics at the Primitive Methodist Mutual Improvement Association.

=== Official roles ===
Taylour was the First Honorary Secretary of the Galloway branch of the National Society for Women's Suffrage from 1870 to 1872. She was joint Secretary of the Edinburgh National Society for Women's Suffrage, one of the first three suffrage societies to be formed in Britain, with Agnes McLaren from 1873 to 1876, and an executive member of the central committee of the national Society. In 1901 she was a vice-president of the National Union of Women's Suffrage Societies.

In Saffron Walden, in 1895, she was Secretary of the local branch of the British Women's Temperance Association, and was influential in getting women appointed to the local Board of Guardians.

=== Recognition ===
In recognition of her voluntary efforts for the cause of women's suffrage in Scotland, Taylour was presented with jewellery and 150 guineas.

The Workers' Education Association included Taylour in their history of Scottish Suffragists webpage. On the centenary of the right of some women to vote, Representation of the People Act 1918, Jane Taylour featured on the Glasgow Women's Library website with an animated video on her impact as one of the first woman to lecture in public. She also was mentioned on the University of Edinburgh Information Services Celebrating 100 years of votes for women. Taylour is one of the activists included in Scotland's Suffragette Trumps and educational packs sent to Scottish schools.

== See also ==
- Suffragette
- Women's suffrage in the United Kingdom
