= Edinburgh National Society for Women's Suffrage =

Edinburgh women's suffrage society founded 1867

The Edinburgh National Society for Women's Suffrage was a leading group for women's rights in Scotland. It was one of the first three suffrage societies to be formed in Britain.

== History ==
The Edinburgh Ladies' Emancipation Society was at one time the focus for women's rights in Edinburgh. This came to an end when Eliza Wigham, Jane Wigham and some of their friends set up the Edinburgh chapter of the National Society for Women's Suffrage on 6 November 1867. Eliza and her friend Agnes McLaren became the secretaries, Priscilla Bright McLaren was the president and Elizabeth Pease was the treasurer. One aim of the group was to influence a change in policy through supportive key politicians (MPs) John Stuart Mill, Jacob Bright and Duncan McLaren.

In 1868, Mary Burton, a member of the Society, went to court, unsuccessfully, for the right to register to vote.

By 1877, Eliza Wigham was still the secretary but she was sharing the role with Emily Rosaline Orme.

Jessie C. Methven became honorary secretary in the mid 1890s. She was succeeded in 1906 by Elsie Inglis. Inglis also played a role in the early years of the Scottish Federation of Women's Suffrage Societies, acting as honorary secretary from 1906 to 1914.

Sarah Mair, who was a leading activist for various causes including the Edinburgh Ladies' Educational Association, became president of the society in 1907. Suffragette sisters and hunger strikers Arabella and Muriel Scott joined whilst students at the University of Edinburgh (before 1908).

The organisation campaigned until (some) women got the right to vote in 1918, then renamed as the National Union of Women for Equal Citizenship went on to fight for women's issues.
