= John Estlin =

John Estlin may refer to:

- John Prior Estlin (1747–1817), English Unitarian minister
- John Bishop Estlin (1785–1855), English ophthalmic surgeon, son of the minister
