= Elizabeth Malleson =

English educationalist, suffragist and activist

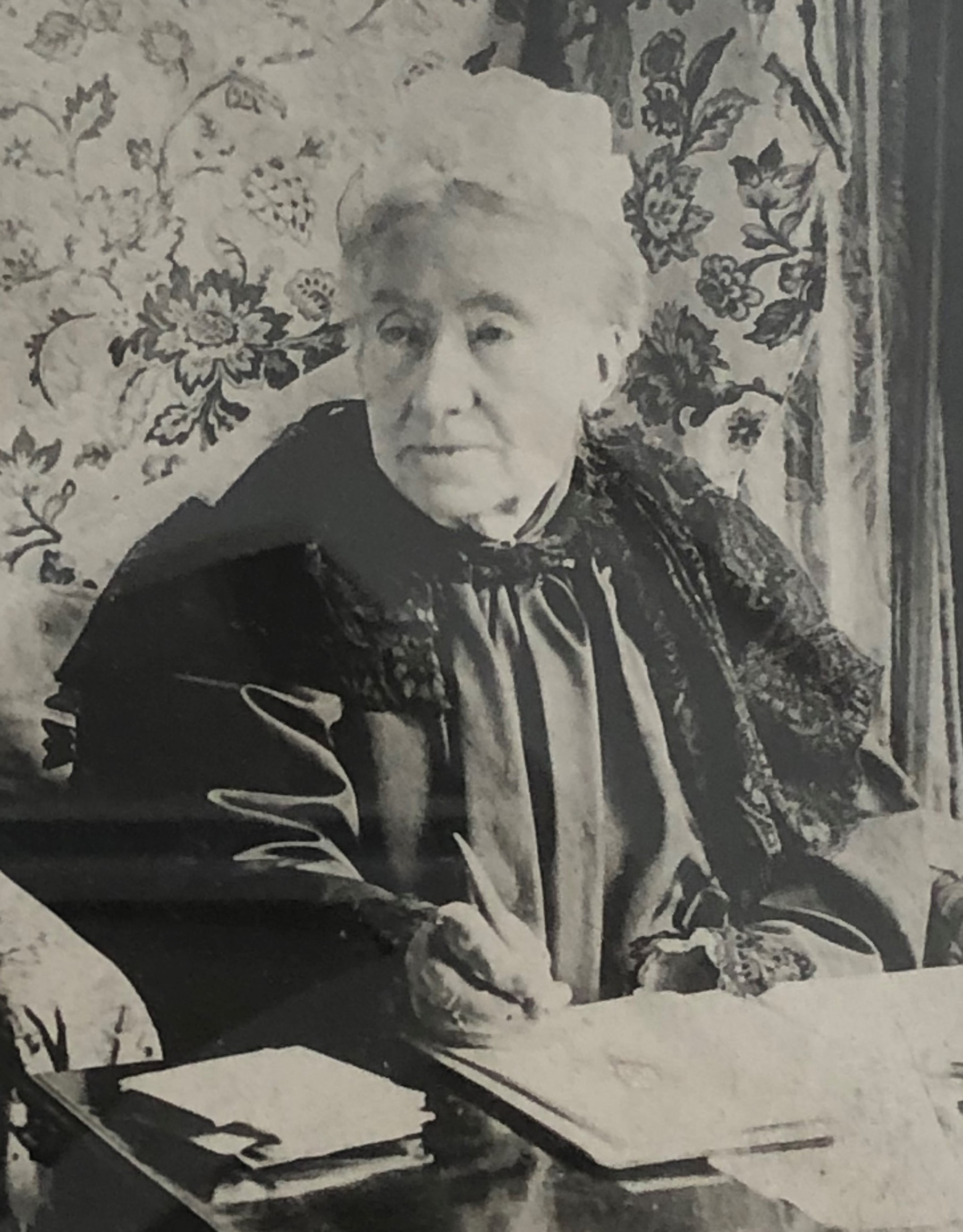
- Born: 1828
- Died: 1916 (aged 87–88)
- Known for: activist for women's education

Elizabeth Malleson (née Whitehead; 1828–1916) was an English educationalist, suffragist and activist for women's education and rural nursing.

== Life ==
Elizabeth Whitehead was born into a Unitarian family in Chelsea, Malleson was the first child of 11. After working as a governess she taught at the experimental Portman Hall School.

In May 1857, she married a businessman and lifelong Unitarian named Frank Rodbard Malleson and they were to have four children. Malleson became involved with Frederick Maurice's Working Men's College.

In 1863, she was a founding member of the Ladies' London Emancipation Society. Other founder members and executive committee included Mary Estlin, Sarah Parker Remond, Harriet Martineau, Eliza Wigham and another women's college founder Charlotte Manning.

Malleson founded the Working Woman's College in Queen Square in Bloomsbury in 1864, and the Rural Nursing Association in 1889 which supplied District Nurses to England's villages.

== Working Women's College ==
The Women's Superintendent in 1865 was Sarah Amos. The college became open to both men and women in 1874 after the Working Men's College refused an offer to merge. This co-educational idea was driven by Malleson and her husband and the resulting opposition in the college led to a group led by Frances Martin moving away to form another college for women.

The Malleson's "College for Men and Women" continued in operation to 1901. The rival women's college started by Frances Martin operated until 1966.

== Rural nursing ==
Malleson moved with her family to Dixton Manor in 1884 and there she was concerned to find that there was little local service of nurses for pregnant women. Malleson arranged for a trained nurse to be available to serve the people of Gotherington. Malleson's scheme was not the first but she decided to form a national organisation and her appeal for help brought her into contact with Lady Lucy Hicks-Beech. She was the wife of Michael Hicks Beach, 1st Earl St Aldwyn and they gathered enough support to launch a Rural Nursing Association.

In 1871, Queen Victoria decided to use £70,000 donated to her Jubilee to found the Queen's Nursing Institute in 1889. Malleson's nurses became the Rural Nursing Division in 1891 and Malleson became the organisation's secretary.
