= National Society for Women's Suffrage =

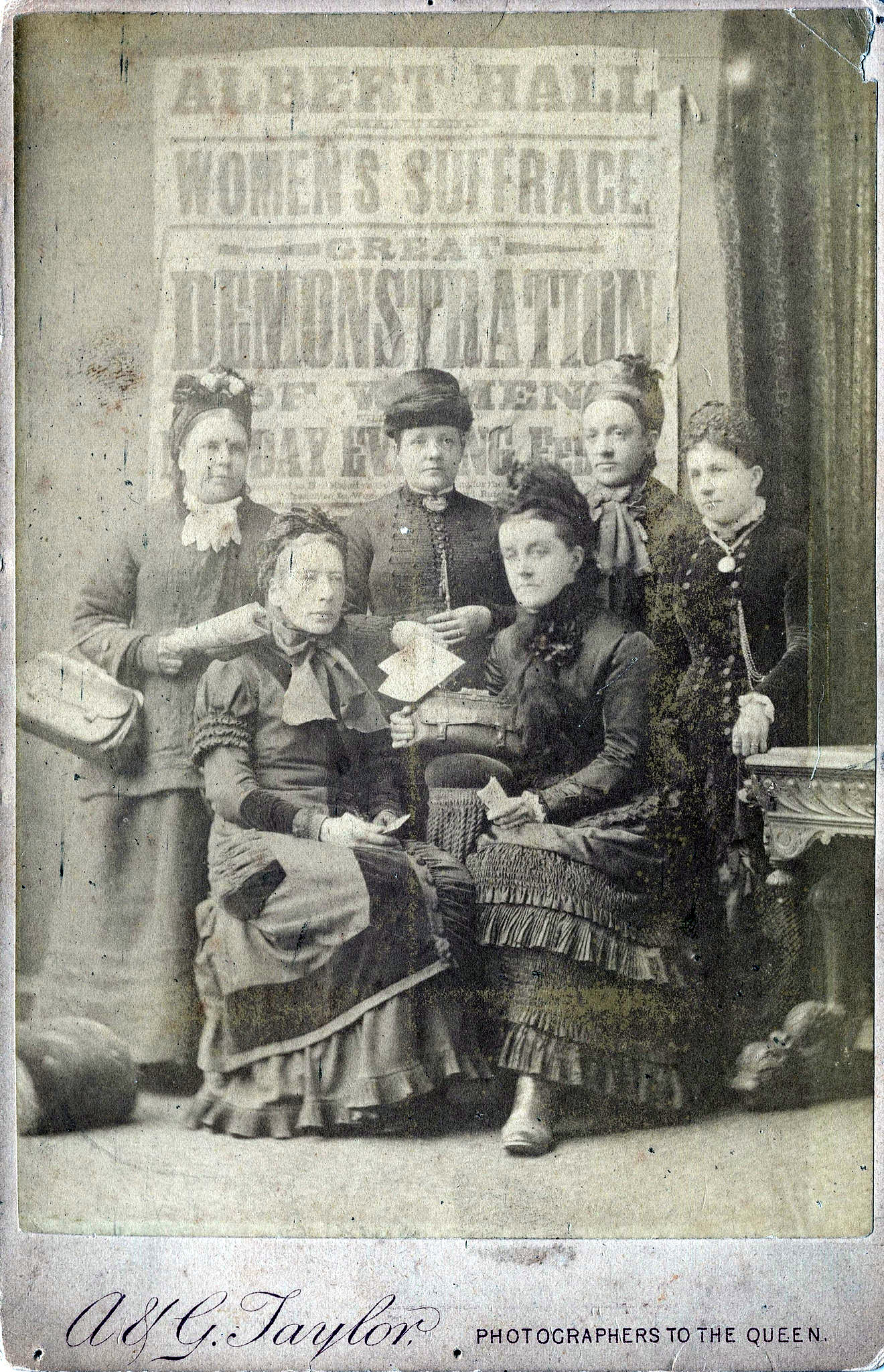
The National Society for Women's Suffrage Manchester Branch

The National Society for Women's Suffrage was the first national group in the United Kingdom to campaign for women's right to vote.

== History ==
Officially formed on 6 November 1867 by Lydia Becker, the National Society for Women's Suffrage helped lay the foundations of the British women's suffrage movement.

Eliza Wigham, Jane Wigham, Priscilla Bright McLaren and some of their friends set up an Edinburgh chapter of this National Society. Eliza and her friend Agnes McLaren became the secretaries. By 1870, branches in Scotland were in Aberdeen, Glasgow, St. Andrews and Galloway.

The society's appeal spread to other major UK cities and by 1871, the Leeds Committee of the National Society for Women's Suffrage consisted of Isabella Ford and Joseph Lupton whilst Millicent Fawcett was a member of the Executive Committee of the London Branch of the society which, having been established on July 5th, 1867, was "therefore in the fifth year of its work" in 1871.

Jacob Bright, a Liberal politician, supported by a petition from Jane Taylour of the Galloway branch and others, had suggested in 1871 that it would be useful to create a London-based organisation to lobby members of parliament concerning women's suffrage. The Central Committee of the National Society for Women's Suffrage first met on 17 January 1872.

In an oral history interview with the historian, Brian Harrison, recorded as part of the Suffrage Interviews project, titled Oral evidence on the suffragette and suffragist movements: the Brian Harrison interviews, the British civil servant, Mary Smieton, talked about how she benefitted from the NSWS.

== See also ==
- Women's suffrage in the United Kingdom
- History of feminism
- List of suffragists and suffragettes
- List of women's rights organizations
- List of women's rights activists
- Timeline of women's suffrage
- Women's suffrage organizations
