= John Murray (abolitionist) =

Scottish abolitionist and social activist

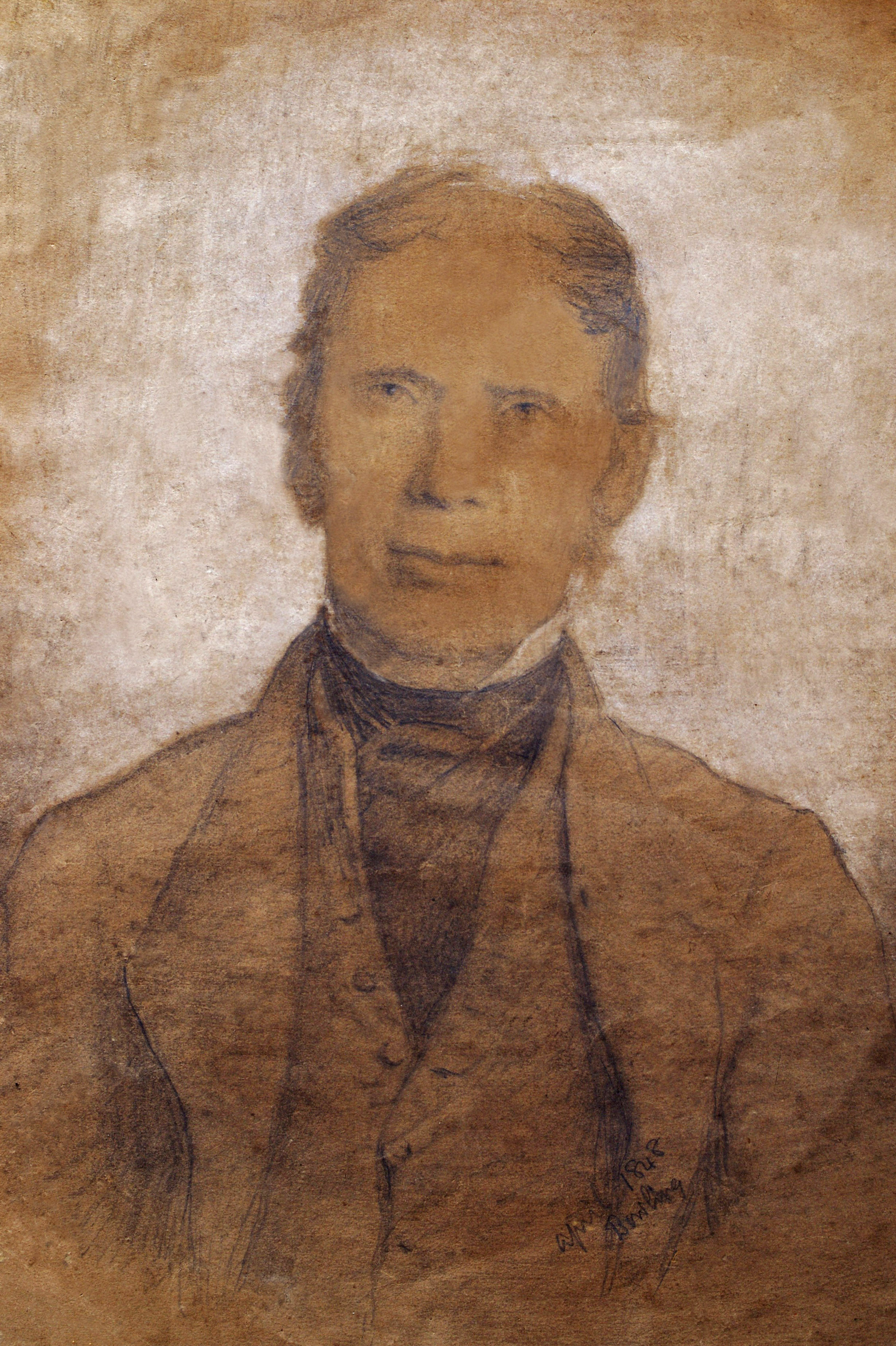
- John Murray, by James Oswald Murray, 1848.
- Born: 1787; England
- Died: 1849 (aged 61–62)
- Occupation: Social activist

John Murray (1787–1849) was an abolitionist and social activist who served as Corresponding Secretary of the Glasgow Emancipation Society.

== Early life ==
Born in England, probably at Portsea where he was baptised in May 1787, he was orphaned at an early age and brought up by paternal relatives in Caithness who provided him with ‘that excellent educational and religious training which is given to the children of the middle and higher classes in Scotland’. Following a pulmonary haemorrhage in his early twenties, he went to the West Indies and found employment as a millwright at St Kitts. He remained there for several years, became acquainted with Dr. William Stephen, a brother of William Wilberforce’s legal adviser James Stephen, and joined with him in protesting the mistreatment of slaves on the island. When Murray later laboured in the abolitionist cause, the Stephen connection fostered close co-operation between him and the Agency Committee of the Anti-Slavery Society led by George Stephen.

== Abolitionist work ==
While in the West Indies, Murray became committed to what historian Duncan Rice has called ‘organizational radicalism’. He was convinced that slaveholding and patronage ‘were forms of property ownership distorted to a point that made them the symbolic antithesis of vital Christianity’.

Returning to Scotland, he quickly identified himself with the abolitionist and other reform movements and became a member of the Glasgow Anti-Slavery Society on its formation in 1822. When that Society ceased to meet, following the abolition of slavery in the British colonies, he called for the establishment of a new association to work for the suppression of slavery worldwide.

His appeals led to the Glasgow Emancipation Society being formed in December 1833 with the Quaker tea merchant William Smeal and himself as its executive officers. The two men became ‘the soul of the Society’ and their conduct of its affairs was largely autonomous. Its object was the global abolition of slavery, and the Society was able to build on a vibrant local tradition of both abolitionism and benevolence. Their administrative efficiency was evidenced in 1838 when more than 100,000 signatures were collected for the Society's petition demanding an end to the ‘apprenticeship’ of freed slaves in the West Indies — a powerful response by the Empire's second city to Lord Melbourne’s negative stance at a meeting with Murray and other Glasgow delegates a few months earlier.

In 1840 Murray was a delegate to the World Anti-Slavery Convention in London; there his proposed scheme for protecting the African continent against slavery was tabled. Shortly afterward a schism occurred in the Glasgow Society and, as part of the reordering of its affairs, Murray was appointed Corresponding Secretary while Smeal became Minutes Secretary and Treasurer. In practice, Murray may always have led the conduct of the Society’s communications. He ‘used more than one ream of paper for manuscripts upon the great cause which he seemed born to carry out’, supplying information and argument to other abolitionist organisations, arranging speaking engagements, preparing addresses and resolutions, and bombarding political leaders at home and abroad with reasoned protests and carefully formulated proposals.

From its birth, the Glasgow Emancipation Society prioritized pressing for British support for the abolitionist struggle in America. Murray identified himself with William Lloyd Garrison’s demands for immediate and unconditional freedom of slaves; he read Garrison’s ‘Appeal to the Friends of Negro Emancipation throughout Great Britain’ (August 1833) to the assembly that resolved to form the Society and later established a warm personal rapport with Garrison and other leaders of the American abolitionist cause who visited Glasgow, often accommodating them at his home and pressing his own money on them for travel expenses. Charles Lenox Remond reported being nursed through several days of fever in ‘the truly hospitable house of my dear friend John Murray’.

Among others from the American movement on familiar terms with Murray was Frederick Douglass, who described him as ‘the firm, the untiring, the devoted friend of the slave’ and captured the force of Murray's commitment when recalling the campaign for the Free Church of Scotland to return American slaveowners’ donations: ‘While he lived that Church obtained no repose.’

== Other activism ==
From 1841 onwards the Glasgow Emancipation Society became increasingly militant not only in the abolitionist interest but across a range of issues dear to its officers, including international peace, constitutional reform, and temperance. Murray was prominent in the Glasgow Anti-War Society, sat on the committee of the Glasgow Voluntary Society (committed to disestablishment of the Church), called for total abstinence, and was a delegate to the International Peace Congress at London in 1843 and Brussels in 1848.

On returning from the West Indies he had set up as a spirit merchant but, becoming convinced of the evil of strong liquor, he gave up the trade and donated his stock to Glasgow Royal Infirmary. When he declined to drink or serve fermented wine at the Lord's Supper of Old Kilpatrick Relief Church, he was removed from his position as an elder of the Church; on his appealing against such removal, the Paisley Presbytery expelled him from membership of the Church, and when he carried the matter onward to the Synod his expulsion was confirmed.

Even as early as 1841 the wide-ranging radicalism of his views was observed by Nathaniel Peabody Rogers: ‘If there is a revolution in Scotland within twenty years, the name of John Murray will not be undistinguished in its history.’

== Legacy ==
Shortly after the death of the American statesman Henry Clay in 1852, James McCune Smith compared the legacy of Clay's forty years at the heart of American public life with the enduring achievements of John Murray. In favour of the latter, he declared, ‘I cannot help thinking how much more has been done for the cause of human progress by this faithful servant to his own convictions of the truth.’

== Service with Forth & Clyde Canal Company ==
Murray's paternal family had intermarried with the influential Oswalds of Shieldhall, and he was able to engage the support of his kinsman James Oswald, MP for Glasgow, for some of the Emancipation Society's initiatives. Oswald later became one of the Society's vice-presidents, and he was also instrumental in obtaining employment for Murray with the Forth and Clyde Canal Company.

While an inspector of works for the Company in 1828, Murray recommended the navigational trials which ultimately led to the Canal being used by steam vessels, thereby overcoming the generally prevailing prejudice against such use and resulting in the Canal becoming the principal conduit for Glasgow-manufactured goods to the ports on the Firth of Forth. He was subsequently made Collector for the company. This appointment brought with it the house at Bowling Bay which was visited by many transatlantic abolitionists.

== Death and family ==
Murray died at Bowling, after successive attacks of paralysis, on 26 March 1849. He left a widow, Anne, née Thomson (a committee member of the Glasgow Ladies’ Auxiliary Emancipation Society from its formation in 1834 until her death in 1850). The couple had two sons and a daughter. Each of the children was involved in their father's work from an early age. The elder boy, James Oswald Murray (1823–70), contributed verses in support of the abolitionist cause to various publications, and arranged the printing of the French translation of Frederick Douglass’s Narrative in 1847, but was so impregnated with ‘the Garrison spirit’ that Elihu Burritt had to abandon plans to involve him in his peace campaign. James Oswald Murray was also an able artist whose portraits included that of his father, drawn at Bowling in April 1848.
