= Rachel Frances Alexander =

Social campaigner in London (1875–1964)

Rachel Frances Alexander (13 May 1875 – 8 December 1964) was a social campaigner in Kensington, London. She was involved in the foundation of several charities in the borough including, the Kensington Housing Trust, the Kensington Council of Social Service and the North Kensington Community Centre. Her father William Cleverly Alexander was an early supporter of the painter James McNeill Whistler, who painted two of her elder sisters. Rachel herself was painted by the artist William Nicholson and she and her younger sister Jean donated seventeen paintings from their father's art collection to the National Gallery and pieces of his Japanese collection to the Victoria and Albert (now housed in the British Museum).

== Early life ==
Miss Rachel Alexander (1906) painted by William Nicholson

Rachel Alexander was born on the 13th May 1875 in Kensington, London. She was the second youngest of nine children. Her father William Cleverly Alexander (1840–1916) was a banker in the City of London and worked for his family's firm Alexanders and Co. (later Alexander's Discount Co. Ltd). William Cleverly and his wife Rachel Agnes Alexander (née Lucas, 1837–1900) were supporters of the arts and early supporters of James McNeill Whistler in England. Whistler painted two of her sisters:

- Miss Agnes Mary Alexander (1873, donated to the Tate in 1950) and
- Harmony in Grey and Green: Miss Cicely Alexander (1872–4, donated to the Tate in 1932).

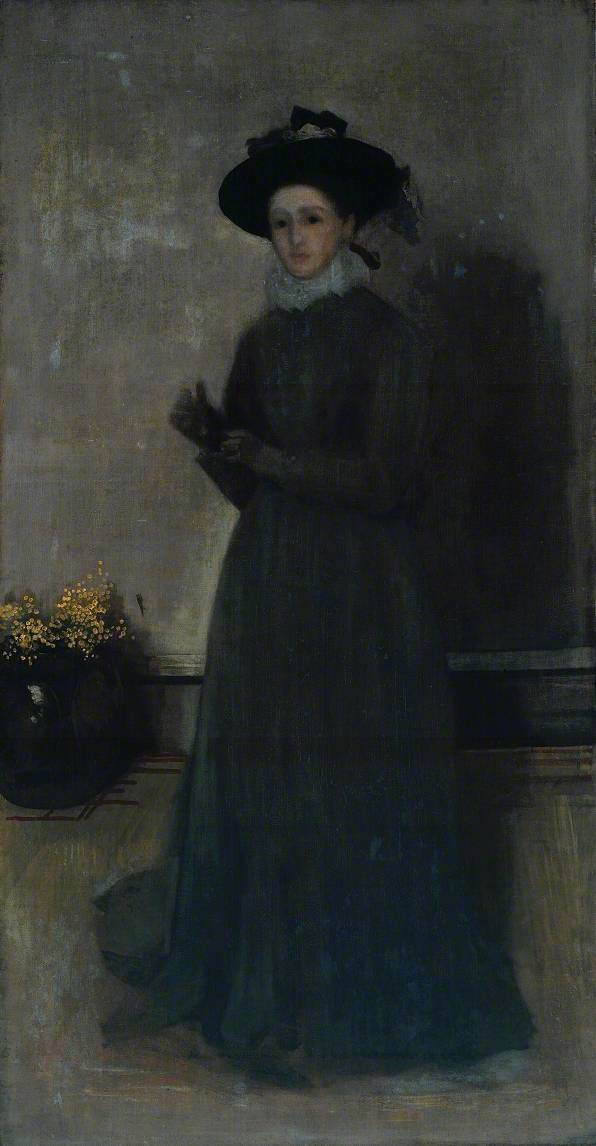
Miss Agnes Mary Alexander (1873), Rachel's elder sister, painted by James McNeill Whistler

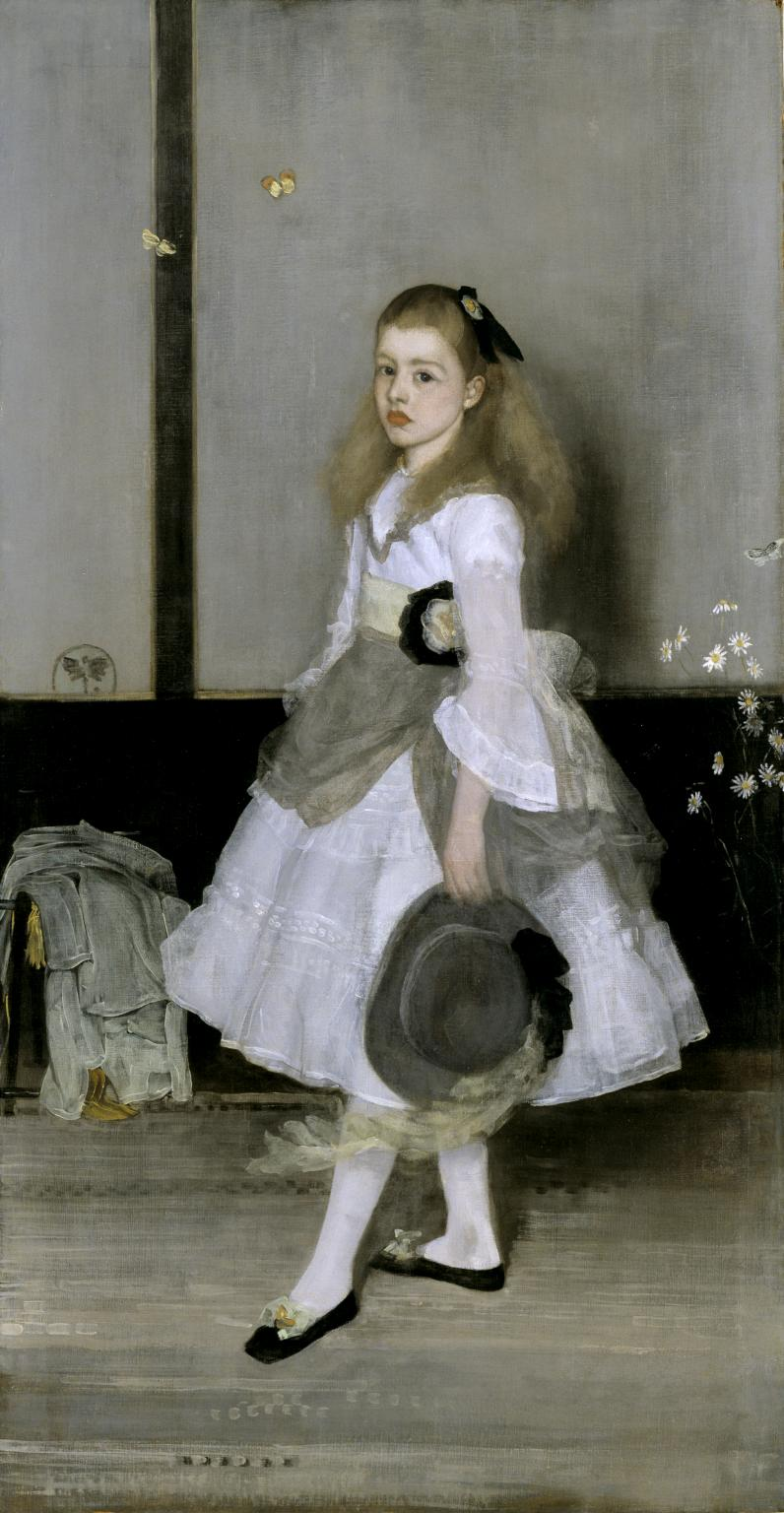
Harmony in Grey and Green: Miss Cicely Alexander (1872–4), Rachel's elder sister, painted by James McNeill Whistler

Whistler also did sketches for another sister, Portrait of Miss Grace Alexander (1873/1876, which were held by the British Museum) as well as advised on redecorating three rooms at the family home Aubrey House in Kensington.

== Community involvement ==
Alexander lived in Aubrey House her whole life and was active in the local community. In 1909 she was the Honorary Secretary of the North Kensington Dispensary for the Prevention of Consumption. In 1917 she and her sisters donated a substantial number of their late father's Japanese collection to the Victoria and Albert Museum now housed in the British Museum. The family also contributed Aubrey House to the war effort during World War I. The house became a Voluntary Aid Detachment (VAD) hospital for recuperating soldiers and was returned to the sisters after the war. Alexander's work in the war could have also been more direct as the notice of her death in the Kensington News and West London Times in 1964 states, "In the First World War she [Rachel] worked with the [Society of] Friends in France, and received a medal from the French government for her work there." In 1926 she was a founding member of the Kensington Housing Trust and she was elected to the Council of the Society that same year. Her involvement lasted until her death in 1964.

In 1867 Aubrey House, under the prior owners Peter and Clementia Taylor, was the scene of the first meeting of the Committee of the London National Society for Women's Suffrage. Dame Millicent Fawcett (1847–1929) became a member of the Society's executive committee that year, aged 19. Much later in 1925 and again in 1927, when Alexander and her sister Jean Ingelow Alexander (1877–1972) (the "Misses Alexanders") owned the house, Dame Millicent Fawcett returned as part of the National Union of Societies for Equal Citizenship and spoke at two large gatherings held in the garden at Aubrey House. In 1929 the sisters also hosted a reception for the Women's International League for "two women delegates of the British Government to the Geneva Assembly". Their garden and home were frequently opened to raise money for local charities.

Alexander was greatly involved in local issues in Kensington and was a founding member of the Kensington Council of Social Service in 1920. In 1935 she was instrumental in opening a nursery school for 40 children at the Housing Estate in Dalgarno Gardens. She also helped to found a Community Centre in Kensington in 1936, which celebrated her on its 21st year anniversary in 1957, when she was 80. In 1948 she was the inspiration for opening Ray House, a home for the elderly in Kensington and in 1951 she was also Secretary of the Kensington Holiday Trust.

== Portraits ==
Alexander's father commissioned William Nicholson to paint a portrait of her when she was 30. The painting was done in 1905 at Bolton Studios, Chelsea and is very large, measuring 67 x 51 inches (170.2 x 129.5 cm). It was exhibited as No. 123 in the 1907 International Society of Sculptors, Painters and Gravers (London) exhibition in New Gallery, Regent Street, London. The background of the painting contains a large drawing of a woman on horseback (who could be the sitter herself). Rachel owned the painting through at least 1956, when she is cited as the owner by Lillian Browse in her book William Nicholson .

According to Patricia Reed's William Nicholson: A Catalogue Raisonne of the Oil Paintings, William Cleverly Alexander also owned several other paintings by William Nicholson: La Petite Marchande (The Little Shopkeeper, 1902), Deer in Blenheim Park (1903), Whiteways – Rottingdean (1909), Saltdean, Rottingdean (1909), Fuchsias in a Blue and White Jug (1909), Purple Tulips (1911) and Cupids Fighting for a Rose (1910). He may also have owned Still Life (1907) and Clifftop: Rottingdean by Moonlight (1910) as these were cited as belonging to him in a 1990 exhibition catalogue produced by the National Portrait Gallery, London, but cited by Reed as being owned by his son, Geoffrey Alexander in 1910–1911. (William Gregory Alexander died in 1911.)

Rachel Alexander also had her silhouette cut by the well known silhouette artist Hubert Leslie . It was done in 1923 on the West Pier in Brighton and is held by the National Portrait Gallery, London.

== Death and legacy ==
Alexander died in December 1964 and her younger sister Jean died in 1972. However, in 1959 the sisters had signed a Deed of Gift with the National Gallery, so in 1972 after Jean died, seventeen paintings from their family were gifted to the nation, most of which still reside at the National Gallery in London.
