= William Smeal =

Scottish abolitionist (1792–1877)

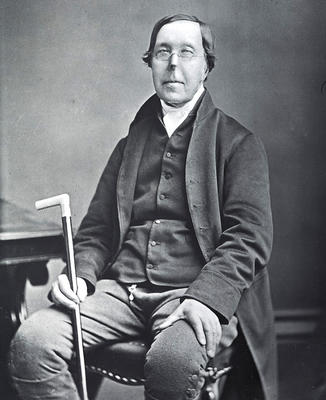
- Smeal in 1865
- Born: 1792
- Died: 1877 (aged 84–85)
- Known for: founding the Glasgow Emancipation Society
- Family: Jane Smeal

William Smeal (1792–1877) was a grocer and an abolitionist Quaker from Glasgow.

== Life ==
William Smeal was born in 1792. He and his brother James were both grocers and were active in the anti-slavery movement in Scotland. He is credited with founding the Glasgow Anti-Slavery Society, forerunner of the Glasgow Emancipation Society, in 1822. He was noted as a tea merchant, and his sister Jane Smeal was also a leading abolitionist.

Smeal attended the week-long World Anti-Slavery conference in 1840. His presence there was captured in a portrait, where he appears alongside other Quakers such as Josiah Forster, businessmen such as Tapper Cadbury and Samuel Fox, bankers such as George Head Head, and other prominent abolitionists from a number of countries including America, South Africa and Jamaica. The meeting had been organised by Joseph Sturge from Birmingham.

Smeal is on the right at the back in this painting which is of the 1840 World Anti-Slavery Convention. Move your cursor to identify him or click icon to enlarge

== Legacy ==
William Smeal's family were unusual in Scotland for being Quakers. In 1851 a census found that there were fewer than 400 practising Quakers in Scotland.

Smeal died in 1877, and his obituary recorded his interests in opposing injustice throughout his life. He opposed the corn laws, alcohol, stamp duties, capital punishment, war and slavery. He has been considered a model of a Quaker's contribution to public life. His sister Jane was a leader of the anti-slavery movement, and her stepdaughter Eliza Wigham was a noted campaigner for abolitionism and women's rights.
