= Ladies' London Emancipation Society =

British abolitionist group

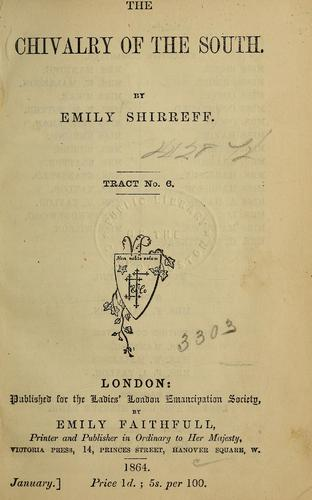
The Chivalry of the South by Emily Shirreff published for the Ladies' London Emancipation Society

The Ladies' London Emancipation Society was an activist abolitionist group founded in 1863, which disseminated anti-slavery material to advance British understanding of the Union cause in the American Civil War as one pertaining to morality rather than territory. This was said to be the first national anti-slavery society for women.

== Foundation ==
The society was established on 20 August 1863 by Clementia Taylor, also known as Mentia Taylor at Aubrey House. She formed the society in response to an open letter written by Harriet Beecher Stowe, published in the Atlantic Monthly in January 1863, calling for the women of England to support the North in the American Civil War. As a woman, her application for membership of the London Anti-Slavery Society had been turned down, and so she formed the Ladies' London Emancipation Society. The two organisations worked in cooperation, although they were independent of each other.

== Founder members and Executive Committee ==
In addition to Taylor, other founder members and executive committee included Mary Estlin, Sarah Parker Remond, Harriet Martineau, Eliza Wigham and women's college founders Charlotte Manning and Elizabeth Malleson. This was said to the first national anti-slavery society for women, although other regional anti-slavery organisations for women pre-dated it including the Edinburgh Ladies' Emancipation Society and the Philadelphia Female Anti-Slavery Society (which was founded in 1833).

The society had over 200 members, including many new to the anti-slavery cause. Members included Ellen Craft, an escaped slave, and novelist Caroline Ashurst Biggs.

== Publications ==
The society distributed five tracts in 1863, including pieces by Isa Craig and Frances Power Cobbe. The second tract was a collection of excerpts, including the actress Frances Ann Kemble's Journal of a Residence on a Georgian Plantation in 1838–1839. Kembles's work documented the cruel treatment of black slave women by their owners. The owners included her own estranged husband, Pierce Butler.

The society's annual report was published in January 1864 by Emily Faithfull and she published other works on behalf of this society.

== See also ==
- Abolitionism in the United Kingdom
- Society for Effecting the Abolition of the Slave Trade
- Edinburgh Ladies' Emancipation Society
- Philadelphia Female Anti-Slavery Society
- Women's suffrage in the United Kingdom
