= Elizabeth Pease Nichol =

English activist (1807–1897)

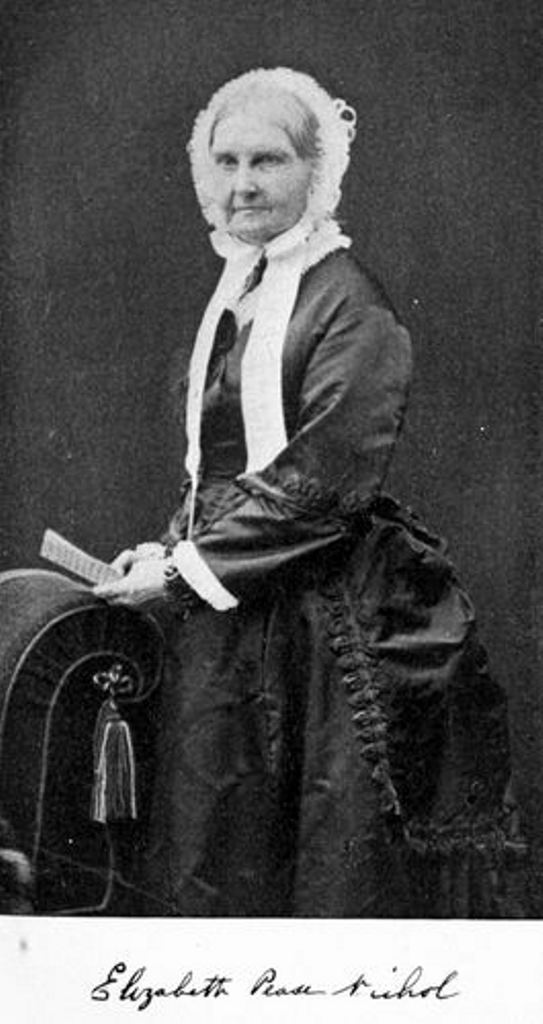
- Born: Elizabeth Pease; 5 January 1807; Darlington, England
- Died: 3 February 1897 (aged 90); Edinburgh, Scotland
- Known for: Abolitionist and suffragist

Elizabeth Nichol (née Pease; 5 January 1807 – 3 February 1897) was an English abolitionist, anti-segregationist, woman suffragist, chartist and anti-vivisectionist. She was active in the Peace Society, the Temperance movement and founded the Darlington Ladies Anti-Slavery Society. In 1853 she married Dr. John Pringle Nichol (1804–1859), Regius Professor of Astronomy at the University of Glasgow. She was one of about six women who were in the painting of the World Anti-Slavery Convention of 1840.

== Biography ==
=== Early life ===
Elizabeth Pease was born in Darlington, England to Joseph Pease and his wife Elizabeth Beaumont, who were members of the Society of Friends (Quakers). Her father was a founder of the Peace Society.

The Quakers held strong views about the value of educating girls as well as boys. Elizabeth attended a school with her brother and male cousins, one of only two girls at the school. When it closed down, her education continued at home, where it was disrupted by her mother's poor health: Elizabeth nursed her mother from an early age.

=== Public life ===
By 1837, Pease was leading the Darlington Ladies Anti-Slavery Society. Charles Stuart, an Anti-Slavery abolitionist and lecturer, encouraged her to send a female delegate or attend a national society being formed by Joseph Sturge. Pease resisted more public involvement, as she did not seek the limelight but wanted to work locally for the causes she held to be important.

In 1838 Pease published an important pamphlet with Jane Smeal titled Address to the Women of Great Britain. This document was a call to action to British women, asking them to speak in public and to form their own anti-slavery organisations.

=== 1840 Convention ===
Pease is on the right edge in this painting which is of the 1840 Anti-Slavery Convention.

In 1840, Pease travelled to London to attend the World Anti-Slavery Convention beginning on 12 June, as did her friend, Eliza Wigham who was secretary of the Edinburgh Ladies Emancipation Society. Before the suffragists started, she met American activists Lucretia Mott and Elizabeth Cady Stanton.

Before the convention opened, Sturge, the British organiser, told the six women delegates they would not be allowed to participate. Leading English Anti-Slavery members had rebuked him for thinking this "insane innovation, this woman-intruding delusion," should be allowed. At the time, women attendees were required to sit in segregated areas out of sight of the male delegates. The matter became contentious because some of the male delegates from the United States supporting the women's participation. They included George Bradburn, Wendell Phillips, James Mott, William Adam, Isaac Winslow, J. P. Miller and Henry B. Stanton. William Lloyd Garrison, who did not arrive until 17 June, refused to take his seat until women had equality in seating. Henry Grew, an American Baptist spoke in favour of the men's right to exclude women, despite his daughter's being one of those affected. The result was that the American women had to join British women observers, such as Lady Byron, Anne Knight and Pease, in a segregated area.

The picture above shows Pease in a painting commemorating the international event. It attracted delegates from the United States, France, Haiti, Australia, Ireland, Jamaica and Barbados, as well as Great Britain. With the exception of Mary Clarkson, the women are portrayed to the far right, with none in the foreground.

Pease attended with Anne Knight and several other friends, but it was only Knight and Pease of their circle who were among the women notables chosen for the painting. Other women included were Amelia Opie, Baroness Byron, Mary Anne Rawson, Mrs John Beaumont, Elizabeth Tredgold, Mary Clarkson and, at the back, Lucretia Mott.

=== Women's suffrage movement ===
After moving to Edinburgh, Elizabeth became the treasurer for the Edinburgh chapter of the National Society for Women's Suffrage. A group including Eliza and Jane Wigham had set up the Edinburgh chapter of the National Society of Women's Suffrage. Eliza and her friend Agnes McLaren were the secretaries, and Priscilla Bright McLaren was the president.

=== Marriage and family ===
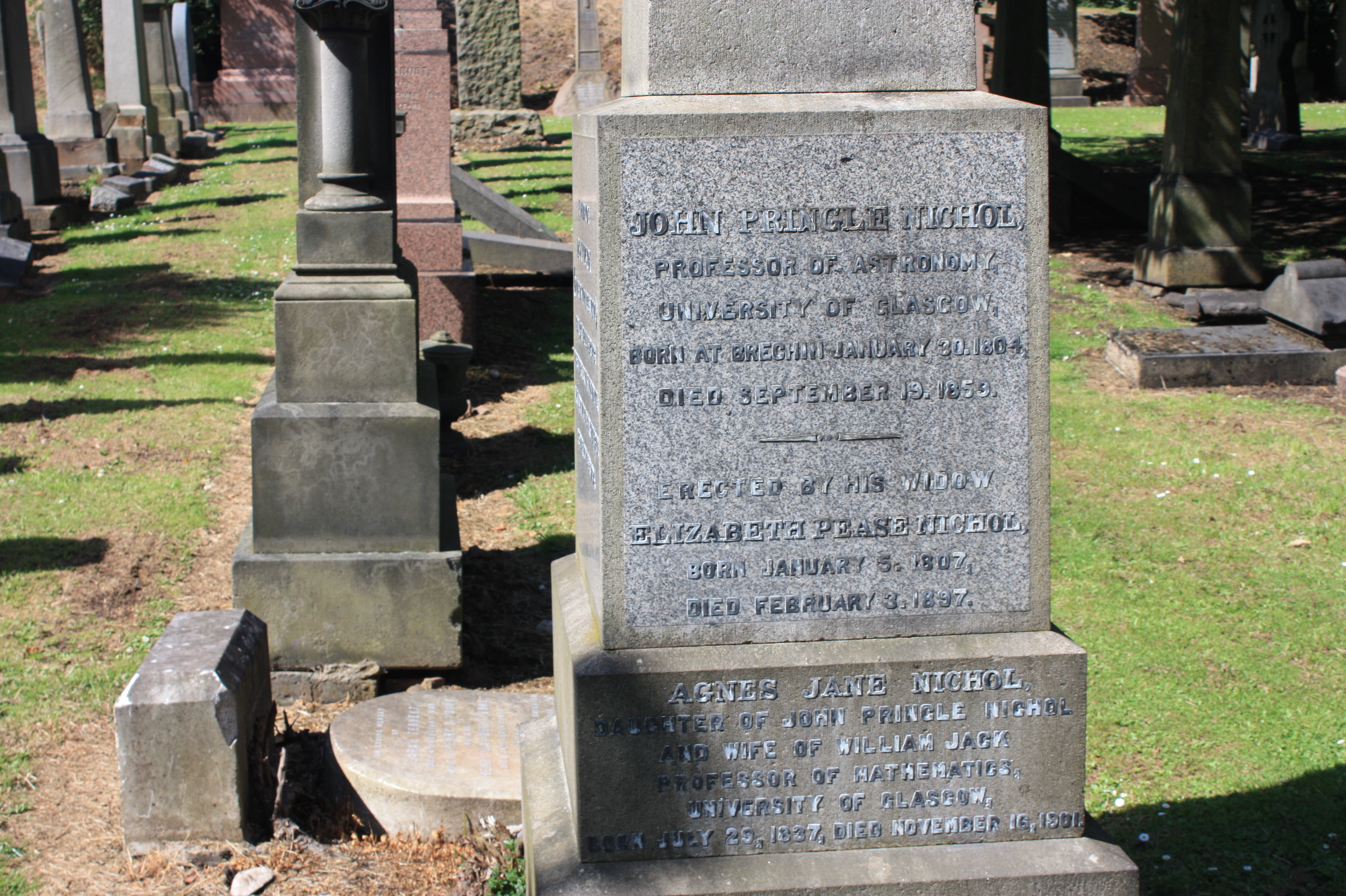
Grave of Elizabeth Pease Nichol, Grange Cemetery, Edinburgh

In 1853 Elizabeth married Dr. John Pringle Nichol (1804–1859), Regius Professor of Astronomy at the University of Glasgow and she moved to Glasgow to live with him. Her family opposed the marriage, as Nichol was a Presbyterian. Under the endogamous rules of the Quakers, Pease had to leave the Society of Friends.

On his death she moved to Edinburgh living at Huntly Lodge in the Merchiston district.

She is buried with her husband in Grange Cemetery in Edinburgh.

=== Recognition ===
Pease was amongst four women associated with Edinburgh who were the subject of a campaign by local historians in 2015. The group aimed to gain recognition for Elizabeth Pease Nichol, Priscilla Bright McLaren, Eliza Wigham and Jane Smeal – the city's "forgotten heroines".

== See also ==
- List of peace activists
