= Jane Wigham =

Scottish abolitionist (1801–1888)

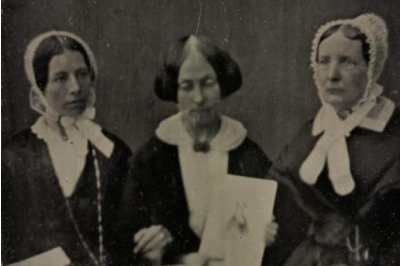
- Eliza Wigham, Mary Estlin, and Jane Wigham c. 1845
- Born: Jane Smeal; 1801; Glasgow, Scotland
- Died: 1888 (aged 86–87)
- Known for: Abolitionism, Suffragism

Jane Wigham (née Smeal; 1801–1888) was a leading Scottish abolitionist, and was the secretary of the Glasgow Ladies' Emancipation Society.

== Life ==
Smeal was born in Glasgow, Scotland, in 1801, the sister of William Smeal. She was educated as a Quaker at Ackworth School in Yorkshire. The family resided in Edinburgh, later moving to Aberdeen. As Quakers, Smeal's family were unusual in Scotland. The 1851 census shows that there were fewer than 400 active Scottish Quakers at the time.

Smeal became the leader and secretary of the radical Glasgow Ladies Emancipation Society. Her brother William in 1822 founded the Glasgow Anti-Slavery Society, a forerunner of the Glasgow Emancipation Society, and was later active in the latter. Smeal had a record of anti-slavery activity, long before the Free Church became involved in the issue.

In 1838, she published an important pamphlet with Elizabeth Pease of Darlington titled Address to the Women of Great Britain. This document called for British women to speak in public and to form anti-slavery organisations for women. An address that Smeal prepared for Queen Victoria has been credited with being the "final blow" that ended slavery in the Caribbean.

In 1840, Smeal became the second wife of the Quaker John Wigham, who was a tea merchant and active abolitionist in Glasgow. In 1830, Wigham's wife and two of their children died however the family was revitalized when he married Smeal. Jane Smeal became Jane Wigham and she formed a close friendship and collaboration with her stepdaughter, Eliza Wigham. Smeal and Wigham's marriage took place in the same year as the World's Anti-Slavery Convention in London, where Eliza was one of the delegates.

After the Ladies' Emancipation Society ceased activity, Jane and Eliza, along with some of their friends, set up the Edinburgh chapter of the National Society of Women's Suffrage. Priscilla Bright McLaren, the president, Elizabeth Pease, the treasurer, and McLaren's daughter Agnes McLaren joined Eliza as joint secretaries. Despite a lack of support from her husband John, Jane and her stepdaughter established the Edinburgh society as one of the leading British groups supporting the controversial views of the American abolitionist and social reformer William Lloyd Garrison.

John Wigham died in 1864 and Eliza remained on at the family home on South Gray Street in Edinburgh to care for her stepmother. Jane died in November 1888 after a prolonged illness.

== Legacy ==
Four of the women associated with Edinburgh in the 19th century were the subject of a campaign by Edinburgh historians in 2015. The group aimed to gain recognition for Elizabeth Pease Nichol, Priscilla Bright McLaren, Eliza Wigham, and Jane Smeal – the city's "forgotten heroines".
