= Edinburgh Ladies' Emancipation Society =

Women's group advocating abolition of slavery during the 19th century

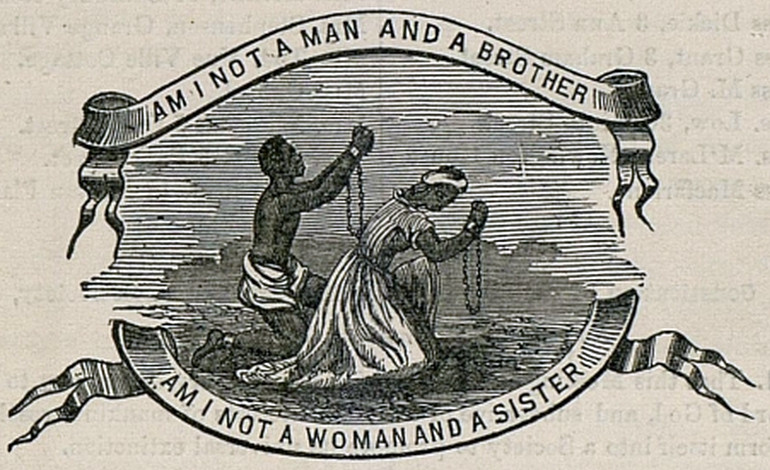
Logo from the society's 1866 annual report

The Edinburgh Ladies' Emancipation Society was a leading abolitionist group based in Edinburgh, Scotland, in the nineteenth century. Its leading members included abolitionist Eliza Wigham who helped bridge the divide between American and British movements through the many connections she held to prominent abolitionist leaders in the United States. The society survived many of the major rifts occurring within Britain at the time between Garrisonians and anti-Garrisonians factions and lived to be one of the longest-standing abolitionist societies.

Major leaders involved in the organization are considered heroines of their city for their major involvement in abolitionist and feminist movements. In 2015, feminist historians in Edinburgh worked to share the achievements of these women to the world.

== History ==
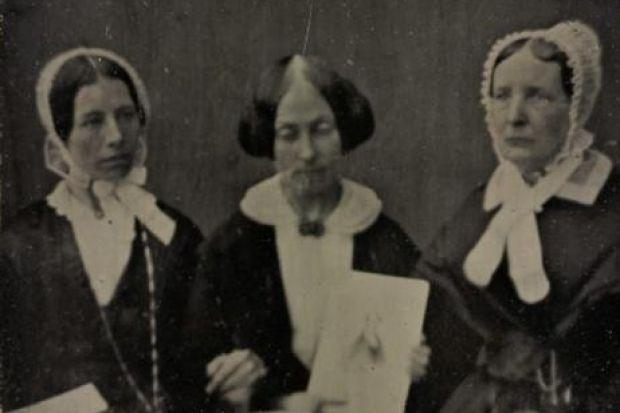
From left to right: Eliza Wigham, Mary Estlin, Jane Wigham, all prominent members of women-led abolitionist societies

On 7 October 1833, a group of activists formed the Edinburgh Ladies' Emancipation Society, the Edinburgh Emancipation Society, the Glasgow Emancipation Society, and the Glasgow Ladies' Emancipation Society to support George Thompson after receiving an invitation to visit the New England Emancipation Society which was led by the 28-year-old William Lloyd Garrison. The division of abolitionist and all general voluntary societies by gender is a prominent trend seen from the 1820s within England with the first women's emancipation society the Female Society for Birmingham. Dr. John Ritchie was in the chair and among the three secretaries was Robert Kaye Greville.

The main leaders of the organization included Eliza Wigham, a prominent Quaker abolitionist and women's rights activist and her stepmother, an equally as prolific abolitionist, Jane Wigham. In 1859, long-standing anti-slavery and women's rights activist Elizabeth Pease Nichol joined. Although Nichol was involved in the abolitionist cause since the late 1830s, only until she reached her 60s did she decide to join her friend's organization after being inspired by meetings with American abolitionist-feminist.

The society played a crucial role in creating nationwide information on the developments of abolitionist movements happening in the United States through their connections to important figures in the movement and dedication to keeping up with published sources. Due to this, the Anti-Slavery Reporter often directly quoted from their sources in their own publishings.

Unlike other anti-slavery organisations that splintered, the Edinburgh organisation was still running in 1870 through the efforts of Eliza and Jane Wigham.

== Garrisonian Controversies ==
A great divide occurred between the Edinburgh Emancipation Society and the Edinburgh Ladies Emancipation Society during the 1840s. This was due to a split in belief with regards to supporting the beliefs of William Lloyd Garrison whose followers called Garrisonians advocated for the immediate release of American slaves. John Wigham III, father to Eliza Wigham and husband to Jane Wigham, led the Edinburgh Emancipation Society in alliance with the British and Foreign Anti-Slavery Society (BFASS) who were firmly anti-Garrisonian. Instead of following his example, Eliza and Jane Wigham stood their ground in promoting Garrisonian beliefs through the Edinburgh Ladies Emancipation Society, creating a prominent divide between male and female abolitionist societies in the city.

Later in the 1850s, a majority of the members of the society voted to sever connections with the American Garrisonians due to alleged religious infidelity. Eliza and Jane Wigham supported this decision and drew strong backlash from Garrisonians across the nation. However, this decision has been lauded as crucial in keeping the community of female abolitionists in Edinburgh united together during a period of turmoil where many societies across Britain were weakening from similar conflicts.

Despite the rifting from Garrisonian beliefs, Eliza and Jane Wigham actively supported efforts at co-operation between the Garrisonians and BFASS such as those by Mary Estlin, leader of the Bristol and Clifton Ladies' Anti-Slavery Society, in 1853.

== Involvement with the American Abolitionist Movement ==
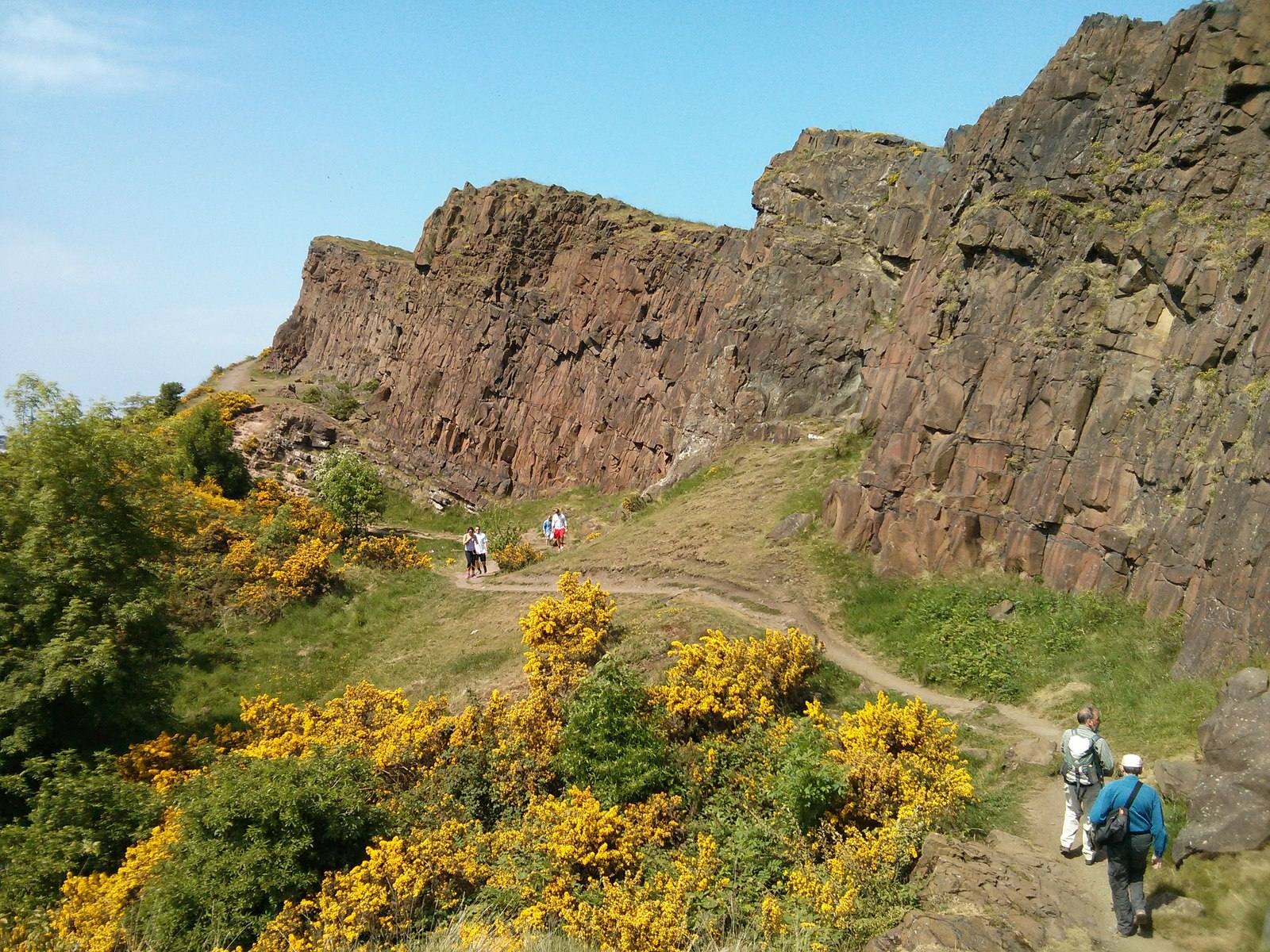
The Salisbury Crags in Edinburgh where the phrase "Send back the money!" was carved out by Eliza Wigham and other abolitionists.

Eliza Wigham, as secretary of the society, corresponded with many of the leading abolitionists. She was friends with many anti-slavery activists including Wendell Phillips, George Thompson and Frederick Douglass. As an American ex-slave, Douglass visited Edinburgh at the invitation of Eliza Wigham and he accompanied Eliza and members of the society when in the 1840s they wrote "Send Back the Money" on the grass of Salisbury Crags in Edinburgh. The graffiti was aimed at the Free Church of Scotland, which had accepted funding from American slave-owning organisations. In 1860, at the society's invitation, American abolitionist campaigner Sarah Parker Remond, who was described as "a lady of colour from America", gave a lecture in Edinburgh that was "crowded to the door by a most respectable audience, number upwards of 2000", whose consciences Remond awakened to a deepened "abhorrence of the sin of Slavery".

Eliza corresponded with Levi Coffin and Thomas Garrett of the Underground Railroad. She sent Garrett money towards the cost of supporting the slaves who were smuggling themselves to Canada via Garrett's house.

After Abraham Lincoln's Emancipation Proclamation outlawing slavery in the United States, the society become one of the first to shift its focus on providing aid to recently freed American slaves. In 1862, Eliza Wigham wrote to the editor of British Friend, a leading abolitionist newspaper in England, to follow in the suit of her society to provide aid to the education of recently free slaves.

The society supported the promotion of education in Africa in the broader context of "civilization" and "Christianization" as they saw it as a way to undermine slavery as well as other parts of African societies which they found objectionable. In their 1864 report they wrote, "We consider that the civilization and Christianization of Africa afford the best antidotes for the slave trade, native slavery, and the dreadful human sacrifices."

== Involvement with Women's Rights Movement ==
Prominent leaders in the society including Eliza Wigham and Elizabeth Peace Nichol were also heavily involved with the emerging women's rights movement during the mid-late eighteenth century.

In response to Harriet Lupton's, a Unitarian feminist who was a supporter of Garrison, offer to pay the fees for women to attend the BFASS-organised 1854 nationwide conference, the society opted to send male delegate Duncan McLaren. However, they expressed support for the idea of gender equality within the abolitionist space, writing in a letter:

When it is considered that one of those whose interests the Convention will meet to advocate, one half at least are women...and that during the interval since West India Emancipation, a great share of anti-slavery work and duty had devolved on the women of Britain, we would respectfully suggest that ladies should be specially invited to attend the conference, and thus have the opportunity of representing the wrongs of their sisters who are in bonds.

== Legacy ==
Four of the women associated with the organisation were the subject of a campaign by Edinburgh historians in 2015. The group intended to gain recognition for Elizabeth Pease Nichol, Priscilla Bright McLaren, Eliza Wigham, and Jane Wigham – the city's forgotten heroines. The project received funding from Heritage Lottery and were backed by prominent local historians including Carol Stobie, tutor of the Damned Rebel Bitches Scottish Women's History Group.

Historian and author Eric J Graham has stated that, "They start off as leading lights in the anti-slavery movement and ended up being leading lights of the suffragist movement. They shifted public opinion on the great issues of the day."
