= Clementia Taylor =

British suffragist (1810–1908)

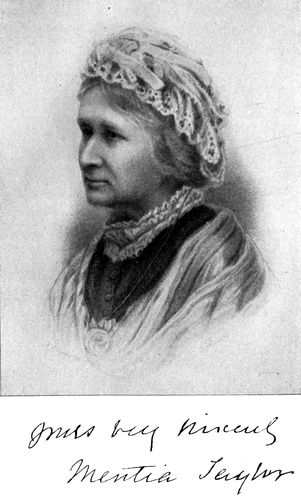
Clementia Taylor

Clementia Taylor known as Mentia (née Doughty 17 December 1810–11 April 1908) was an English women's rights activist and radical Liberal. She was dubbed 'the mother' of the English women's parliamentary suffrage movement as John Stuart Mill recognised her organisational abilities and engineered her role in the movement.

== Life ==
Mentia was born in Brockdish, Norfolk, one of twelve children. Her family was Unitarian, and Clementia became the governess to the daughters of Unitarian minister Reverend Malleson who ran a boys' boarding school at Hove. In 1842 Clementia married Peter Alfred Taylor, the cousin of her pupils. Taylor was later the Liberal Member of Parliament for Leicester.

It is through the Langham Park circle formed by Barbara Bodichon and Bessie Parkes that Mentia first met Marian Evans (George Eliot) and began a friendship that lasted until Marian's death in 1880.

In 1863, Peter Taylor bought Aubrey House in the Campden Hill district of Holland Park in West London. The Taylors opened the Aubrey Institute in the grounds of the House; the Institute gave young people the chance to improve a poor education they might have had. The lending library and reading room of the Institute had over 500 books.

"Those monthly [other sources say fortnightly] parties during the London season were unique and very enjoyable, for Mentia and her husband … were admirably free of class prejudice in persons and opinions, so that all kinds of literary people—refugees from several countries—artists and humble lovers of social enjoyment, mingled with supporters of 'causes' of all kinds"

— From the autobiography of Elizabeth Malleson

The Taylors, Mary Estlin and Eliza Wigham were active in the anti-slavery movement in England and Scotland. In 1863, the Ladies' London Emancipation Society was established and led by Mentia Taylor.

The Taylors were also closely involved in the movement for Italian unification and Giuseppe Mazzini was a frequent visitor to Aubrey House. During his celebrated 1864 visit to London, a reception was held at Aubrey House for Giuseppe Garibaldi and, after, Garibaldi visited Mazzini. Noted radical figures at the reception included feminist Emilie Ashurst Venturi, Aurelio Saffi, Karl Blind, Ferdinand Freiligrath, Alexandre Auguste Ledru-Rollin and Louis Blanc.

Clementia Taylor was on the organising committee of the 1866 petition in favour of women's suffrage that John Stuart Mill presented to the British parliament; the 1499 signatures were collated in Aubrey House. It was at Aubrey House that the Committee of the London National Society for Women's Suffrage held its first meeting in July 1867.

In Moncure D. Conway's autobiography he describes the Taylors' salon at Aubrey House, and Mentia's 'Pen and Pencil Club' at which the work of young writers and artists was read and exhibited. Conway, an American abolitionist and clergyman, moved to Notting Hill to be near the Taylors at Aubrey House. The Taylors' social gatherings were also noted by the American author Louisa May Alcott.

Attendees of the 'Pen and Pencil Club' included the diarist Arthur Munby, and many poets and authors who later achieved fame. Aubrey House was also visited by feminists Barbara Bodichon, Lydia Becker, Elizabeth Blackwell, and Elizabeth Malleson.

In 1873, the Taylors sold Aubrey House due to Peter's ill health, established an apartment near parliament house for when the Commons sat, and moved to Brighton. Mentia Taylor died at Brighton in 1908.
