= Glasgow Emancipation Society =

Anti-slavery abolitionist group formed 1833

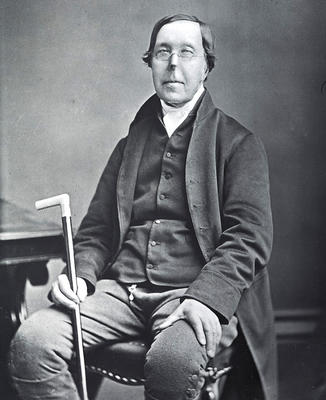
Photograph of William Smeal, circa 1865

The Glasgow Emancipation Society was a group of Glaswegians who formed an anti-slavery abolitionist group in 1833. Prominent members included James McCune Smith, John Murray, William Smeal, Ralph Wardlaw, Anthony Wigham and Hugh Heugh.

There was also a Glasgow Ladies' Emancipation Society and in 1833 there was an Edinburgh Emancipation Society and in time an Edinburgh Ladies' Emancipation Society.

The British and American abolitionist movements split over with the beliefs of William Lloyd Garrison who advocated the immediate release of American slaves. This society like Bristol, Edinburgh, Dublin, Bristol, and Clifton were strong supporters whilst other groups favoured a managed move away from slavery.

== See also ==
- James McCune Smith
- University of Glasgow
