= Eliza Wigham =

Scottish activist (1820–1899)

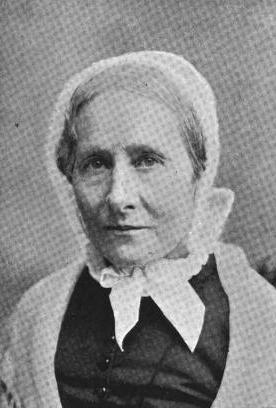
- from an 1895 book
- Born: Elizabeth Wigham; 23 February 1820; Edinburgh, Scotland
- Died: 3 November 1899 (aged 79); Dublin, Ireland
- Known for: Suffragist and abolitionist
- Board member of: Edinburgh Ladies Emancipation Society; Edinburgh National Society for Women's Suffrage
- Parent(s): Jane Richardson; John Tertius Wigham
- Relatives: Jane Wigham (stepmother)

Eliza Wigham (23 February 1820 – 3 November 1899), born Elizabeth Wigham, was a Scottish campaigner for women's suffrage, anti-slavery, peace and temperance in Edinburgh, Scotland. She was involved in several major campaigns to improve women's rights in 19th-century Britain, and has been noted as one of the leading citizens of Edinburgh. Her stepmother, Jane Smeal, was a leading activist in Glasgow and together they made the Edinburgh Ladies' Emancipation Society. Her brother John Richardson Wigham was a prominent lighthouse engineer.

== Life ==
Elizabeth Wigham, later known as "Eliza", was born on 23 February 1820 in Edinburgh to Jane (née Richardson) and John Tertius Wigham, a cotton and shawl manufacturer. The family grew to include six children, residing at 5 South Gray Street, Edinburgh. The Wighams were a part of a network of leading Quaker anti-slavery families of the period operating in Edinburgh, Glasgow, Newcastle, and Dublin. Eliza's mother, older sister, and younger brother died when she was around ten years old. In 1840, her father remarried to Jane Smeal, who was a leading abolitionist and suffragist.

== Campaign work ==
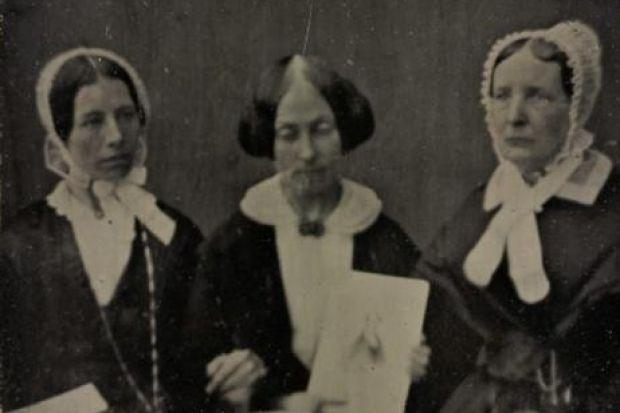
Eliza Wigham, left, a friend, and her mother in law, members of the Edinburgh Ladies' Emancipation Society

Wigham was the treasurer of the Edinburgh Ladies' Emancipation Society. Unlike other abolitionist organisations which splintered, the Edinburgh organisation was still running in 1870. Credit for this is given to Wigham and her stepmother Jane Smeal.

In 1840, Wigham and her friend Elizabeth Pease Nichol travelled to London to attend the World Anti-Slavery Convention, which began on 12 June. Also in attendance at this event were British activists like Lucy Townsend and Mary Anne Rawson and also American activists including Lucretia Mott and Elizabeth Cady Stanton. The female delegates were obliged to sit separately.

Wigham, her stepmother, and some of their friends set up the Edinburgh chapter of the National Society of Women's Suffrage. She and her friend Agnes McLaren became the secretaries, Priscilla Bright McLaren was the president, and Elizabeth Pease was the treasurer.

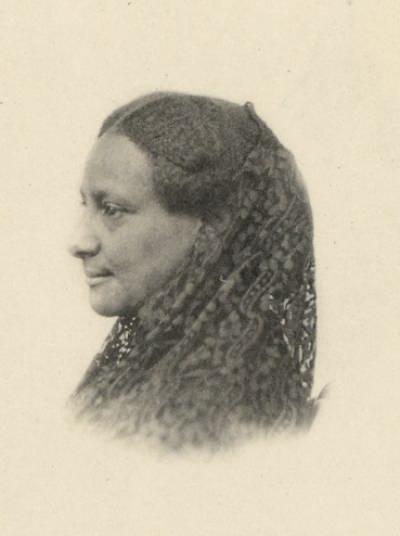
Sarah Parker Remond

Sarah Parker Remond, an American woman of colour, lectured in England, raising large sums of money for the anti-slavery cause. Remond appeared at times with Frederick Douglass. In 1860, at the invitation of Wigham's Edinburgh Ladies' Emancipation Society, she gave a lecture in Edinburgh that was "crowded to the door by a most respectable audience, number upwards of 2000", whose consciences she awakened to a deepened "abhorrence of the sin of Slavery". Remond had expected to confront prejudice similar as what she encountered in the United States. She met with a greater acceptance in Britain. "I have been received here as a sister by white women for the first time in my life."

In 1863 Wigham served on the committee of Clementia Taylor's Ladies' London Emancipation Society with Mary Estlin. In the same year, she wrote The Anti-Slavery Cause in America and its Martyrs, a short book intended to influence the British government. At the time it was feared that Britain might side with the Confederates in the American Civil War and thus would be supporting slavery.

Wigham was also involved with the campaign to repeal acts of Parliament which aimed to contain prostitution. The Ladies National Association for the Repeal of the Contagious Diseases Acts was formed in response to these acts, and was successful in its aims.

She played an active role in the British Women's Temperance Association Scottish Christian Union, becoming a national vice president.

== Life as a carer ==
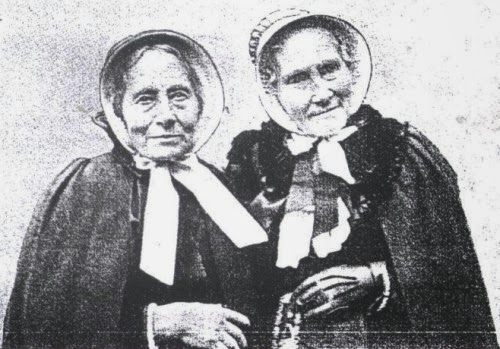
Eliza Wigham and her sister Mary Edmundson

Wigham's father died in 1864, after which she continued to live at her stepmother Jane's house at South Gray Street, Edinburgh. She cared for Jane, who was in ill health until her death in November 1888. After her brother's death in 1897, Wigham sold the property to and moved to Dublin, where she in turn was cared for by her relatives.

Wigham died in Foxrock near Dublin in 1899.

== Legacy ==
A memorial book for Wigham was published in 1901. In 2015, four of the women associated with suffragist and abolitionist campaigns in Edinburgh were the subject of a project by local historians. The group aimed to gain recognition for Wigham, Elizabeth Pease Nichol, Priscilla Bright McLaren, and Jane Smeal – the city's "forgotten heroines".
