= John Prior Estlin =

English Unitarian minister

John Prior Estlin (1747–1817) was an English Unitarian minister. He was noted as a teacher, and for his connections in literary circles.

== Life ==
He was born at Hinckley, Leicestershire, 9 April (O.S.) 1747, and was the son of Thomas Estlin, hosier, by his wife, née Prior. His education was undertaken by his mother's brother, the Rev. John Prior, vicar of Ashby-de-la-Zouch, and chaplain to the Earl of Moira. In 1764 he entered Warrington Academy, where the divinity chair was held by John Aikin. Here he decided that he could not subscribe to the articles of the Church of England, but still desired to become a minister of religion.

In 1770 he accepted an invitation to become the colleague of the Rev. Thomas Wright at the Unitarian chapel at Lewin's Mead, Bristol, and entered on his duties in January 1771. He soon afterwards opened a school at St. Michael's Hill, Bristol, which met with great success, some of his pupils rising to eminence in parliament and the professions. His pupils held him in so much esteem that they obtained the degree of LL.D. (Glasgow) for him without his knowledge. It was conferred in 1807. Samuel Taylor Coleridge, Robert Southey, Joseph Priestley, Mrs. Anna Barbauld, and Robert Hall were among his friends.

About 1816 his sight began to fail; in 1817 he resigned his pulpit, receiving a large sum of money from his congregation as a testimonial; and preaching his farewell sermon on 22 June, he retired to a cottage he had built for himself at his favourite summer haunt, Southerndown, Glamorganshire. There, on Sunday 10 August, he died, aged 70. He was buried in the graveyard of Lewin's Mead chapel.

== Works ==
His publications, of which a list is given at the close of Anna Barbauld's "Memoir" of him (Monthly Repository, xii, 373–5), were numerous, and date from 1790. His Familiar Lectures were published in 1818, and are preceded by a reprint of Barbauld's "Memoir".

== Family ==
Estlin married first a Miss Coates, secondly a Miss Bishop, both of Bristol. By his first wife he had one son; by the second three sons and three daughters, among them the surgeon John Bishop Estlin, and Anne Maria who married James Cowles Prichard.

== Notes ==
Attribution

This article incorporates text from a publication now in the public domain: "Estlin, John Prior". Dictionary of National Biography. London: Smith, Elder & Co. 1885–1900.
