= John Bishop Estlin =

English ophthalmic surgeon (1785–1855)

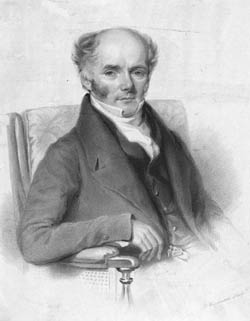
John Bishop Estlin of Bristol

John Bishop Estlin (26 December 1785 – 10 June 1855) was an English ophthalmic surgeon.

== Life ==
Estlin was the son of the Unitarian minister John Prior Estlin, who kept a well-known school in a large house at the top of St. Michael's Hill, Bristol, and was born there on 26 December 1785. He was educated in his father's school, and began his professional studies at the Bristol Infirmary in 1804. He continued them at Guy's Hospital, London, became a member of the College of Surgeons of London in 1806, and, after further study at the University of Edinburgh, settled in practice in Bristol in 1808. He attained success, and, having special interest in ophthalmic surgery, gradually restricted his practice to ophthalmic surgery as far as he could. In 1812 he established a dispensary for the treatment of eye diseases at No.9 Pipe Lane, on the corner of Frogmore Street, Bristol. He maintained this charity for more than a year at his own cost, and afterwards managed its affairs for thirty-six years, treating fifty-two thousand poor patients himself. He kept careful notes of his cases, and published papers in the Edinburgh Medical and Surgical Journal, the London Medical Gazette and the Provincial Medical and Surgical Journal.

Estlin's reputation spread, and he became known as one of the leading ophthalmic surgeons in England. He was elected a fellow of the Royal College of Surgeons of England, the year in which the college received its present charter. In 1817 he married Margaret Bagehot, aunt of Walter Bagehot; she died four years later, leaving an only daughter. She was Mary Anne Estlin and she became a leading abolitionist.

Estlin's health was not robust, and in 1832 he visited the island of St. Vincent, where the warm climate restored him. He obtained and circulated in 1838 a fresh supply of vaccine lymph from cows near Berkeley, Gloucestershire, the place where Edward Jenner had originally discovered the effectiveness of vaccination in preventing smallpox. Estlin rendered other public services in regard to temperance, the abolition of slavery, the education of the poor, the maintenance of religious toleration, and the suppression of medical impostures.

Estlin was a Unitarian with definite theological opinions, and wrote in favour of the Christian miracles and On Prayer and Divine Aid, 1825. In 1845, he published Remarks on Mesmerism, a lucid exposition of the scientific method of investigating phenomena said to be due to hidden forces of nature. He was always generous, but nevertheless grew rich, and became, by force of upright character and professional skill, one of the most trusted men in Bristol. He had an attack of right hemiplegia in May 1853, died 10 June 1855, and was buried in the Lewin's Mead burying-ground, Bristol. In the adjoining meeting-house are monumental tablets for him and his wife.

== Works ==
- 'Amaurosis', Edinburgh Medical and Surgical Journal, 1815
- On Prayer and Divine Aid, 1825
- 'Cataract', London Medical Gazette, 1829
- 'Cysticercus Cellulosæ on the Sclerotica', London Medical Gazette, 1838 and 1840
- 'One Hundred Cases of Operation for Strabismus', Provincial Medical and Surgical Journal, vol. ii.
- 'Pretended Cure of Cataract', Provincial Medical and Surgical Journal. vol. v.
- 'Injuries of the Iris', Provincial Medical and Surgical Journal, vol. vi.
- Remarks on Mesmerism, 1845
