= Priscilla Bright McLaren =

British activist (1815–1906)

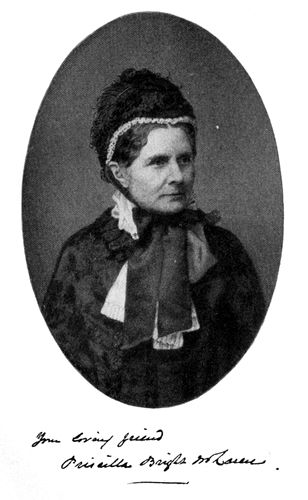
- Born: Priscilla Bright; 8 September 1815; Rochdale, Lancashire, England
- Died: 5 November 1906 (aged 91); Edinburgh, Scotland
- Burial place: St Cuthbert's Kirkyard, Edinburgh, Scotland
- Education: Hannah Johnson's school in Liverpool
- Known for: Suffragist and abolitionist
- Spouse: Duncan McLaren (m. 1848, d. 1886)
- Children: Charles McLaren; Helen Priscilla McLaren; Walter McLaren
- Relatives: John Bright (brother), Jacob Bright (brother), Margaret Bright Lucas (sister), Anne Ashworth (niece), Lilias Ashworth Hallett (niece)

Priscilla Bright McLaren (8 September 1815 – 5 November 1906) was an English activist who served and linked the anti-slavery movement with the women's suffrage movement in the nineteenth century. She was a member of the Edinburgh Ladies' Emancipation Society and, after serving on the committee, became the president of the Edinburgh Women's Suffrage Society.

== Biography ==
She was born Priscilla Bright in Rochdale, Lancashire, England, the fifth of the eleven children. She came from a Quaker family that believed in educating its women. Her father, Jacob Bright, had risen from weaver to bookkeeper to wealthy cotton manufacturer. His politics remained radical and he passed his activist interest to his children. Her mother, Martha, took an equal part in her husband's business concerns and created essay societies and debating clubs for her children. Skills that they developed in addressing an audience were later put to use by the daughters Margaret and Priscilla, as well as the most famous of the Bright sons, Radical MP John Bright and Liberal Party MP Jacob Bright.

Priscilla was educated at a Quaker school in York and Hannah Johnson's school in Liverpool, then attended another Quaker school in Southport with her sister Esther. In 1843, Priscilla attended the first Anti-Corn Law League meeting.

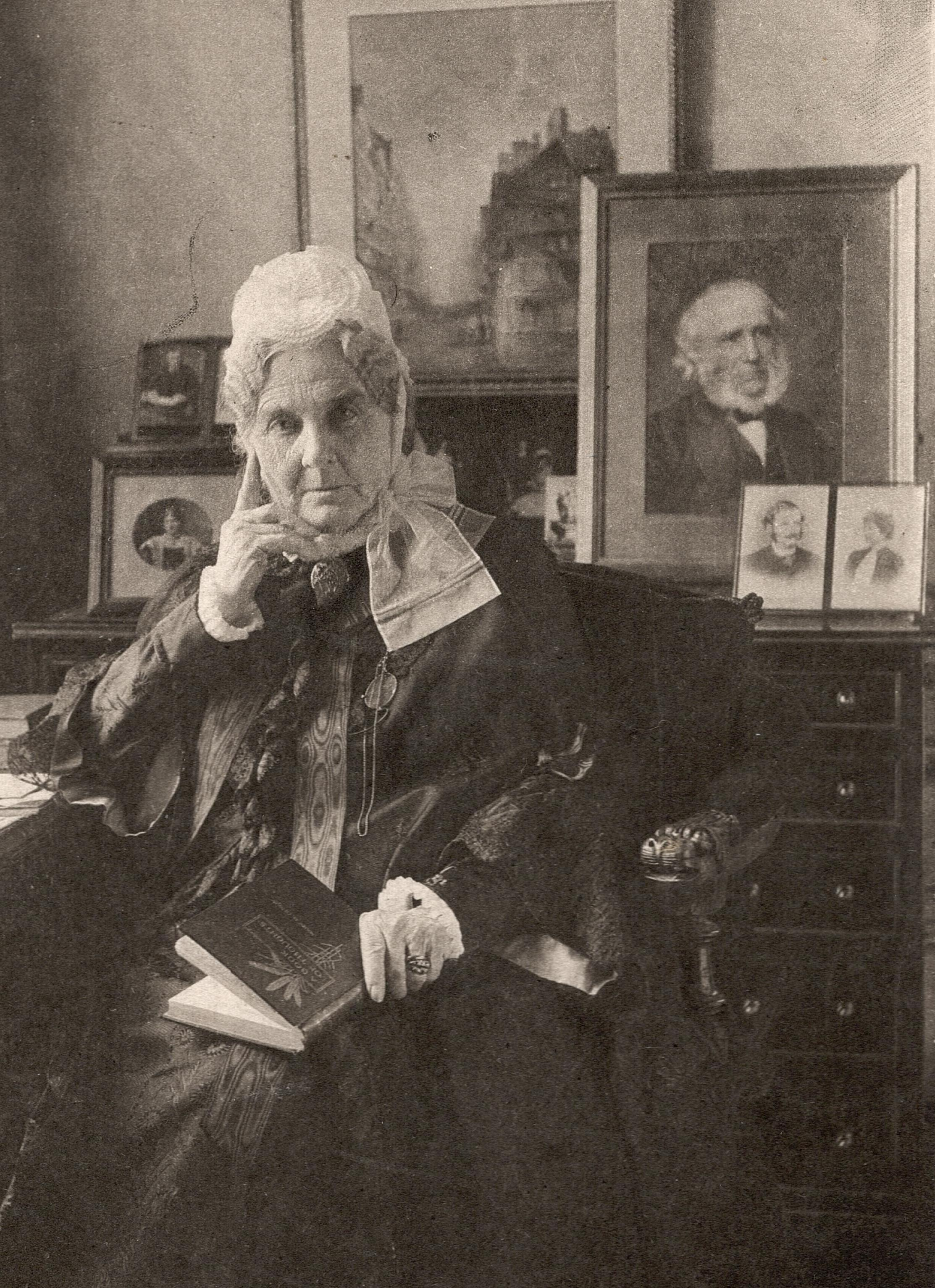
Cabinet card of Priscilla Bright McLaren

Priscilla kept house for her widowed brother, John, including looking after her niece Helen Bright Clark. She believed that she had missed her own chance for a family life, but when John remarried, Priscilla accepted a suitor she had turned down twice before. Duncan McLaren was a twice-widowed Edinburgh merchant. He was considerably older than Priscilla and she became stepmother to his five children, the oldest of whom was aged 17. They married at a registrar's office in 1848.

For accepting Duncan on his third proposal and "marrying out" of the Quaker faith, Priscilla was disowned by the Society of Friends (though she ignored this for the most part, continuing to attend Quaker meetings). Duncan built a political career as a town councillor, Lord Provost, and then Liberal Member of Parliament in 1865. They worked together on many campaigns, described by contemporaries as "equal partners." They had three children together and lived at Newington House in Edinburgh.

After the Ladies' Emancipation Society came to an end, Eliza Wigham, Jane Smeal, and some of their friends set up the Edinburgh chapter of the National Society for Women's Suffrage. Eliza Wigham and McLaren's step-daughter Agnes McLaren became the secretaries, Priscilla McLaren was the president and Elizabeth Pease Nichol was the treasurer.

In 1869, McLaren subscribed to the Married Women's Property Campaign and was a member of the executive committee of the Ladies National Association for the Repeal of the Contagious Diseases Act from its formation in 1870. She also subscribed to Elizabeth Cady Stanton's Revising Committee for the Woman's Bible.

In 1893, McLaren donated funds to the progressive feminist newspaper Shaft, as it was suffering from financial difficulties.

McLaren died from pneumonia at home in Edinburgh on 5 November 1906, shortly after giving her written support for suffragettes who had been imprisoned for their militancy in a letter addressed to the Women's Social and Political Union (WSPU). She was buried beside her husband in St Cuthbert's Kirkyard, Edinburgh, Scotland. Her funeral was attended by members of suffrage societies from across the British Isles.

McLaren's daughter-in-law Laura McLaren, Lady Aberconway, also became involved in the women's suffrage movement.

== Legacy ==
Four women associated with Edinburgh were the subject of a campaign by Edinburgh historians in 2015. The group intended to gain recognition for Priscilla Bright McLaren, Elizabeth Pease Nichol, Eliza Wigham and Jane Smeal – the city's "forgotten heroines".

Her name and picture (and those of 58 other women's suffrage supporters) are on the plinth of the statue of Millicent Fawcett in Parliament Square, London, unveiled in 2018.
