= Mary Estlin =

British reformer

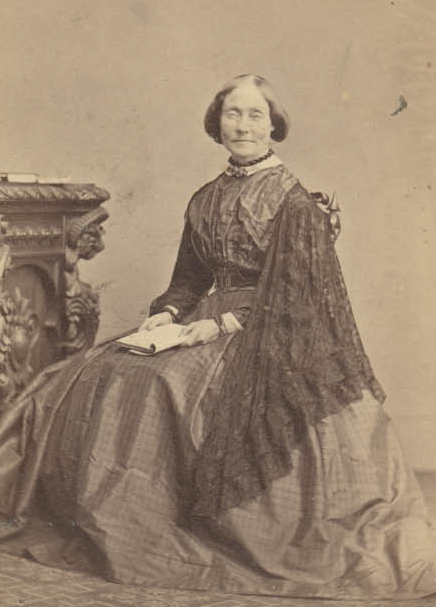
- Mary A Estlin abolitionist
- Born: Mary Anne Estlin; 31 July 1820; Bristol, England
- Died: 14 November 1902 (aged 81–82); Bristol, England
- Known for: Abolitionist
- Parent: John Bishop Estlin

Signature
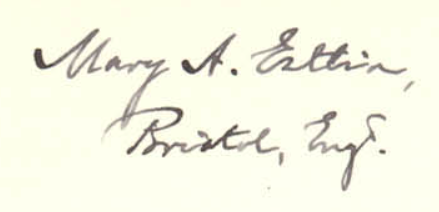

Mary Anne Estlin (31 July 1820 – 14 November 1902) was a British abolitionist and leading figure in anti-slavery and anti-prostitution campaigns in Britain.

== Life ==
Mary Anne Estlin was the daughter of John Bishop Estlin, a leading ophthalmologist in Bristol and his wife Margaret née Bagehot. Her mother died when she was a small child, and she took her father's religion as well as his opposition to slavery. Estlin lived in the family home and never married.

In 1832 she followed her father to the West Indies where she saw the colonial slave system.

From 1851 she led the Bristol and Clifton Ladies Anti-Slavery Society. She and Eliza Wigham were active in the campaign in England and in 1863 they both served on Clementia Taylor's Ladies' London Emancipation Society.

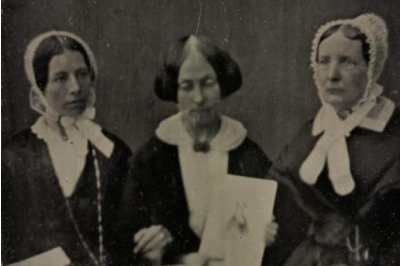
Eliza and Jane Wigham with Estlin between them

In 1854 Parker Pillsbury came to Britain to discuss the differing politics of the American and British abolitionists. Estlin and her father became involved in Pillsbury's problematic correspondence with the British activist Louis Chamerovzow, the secretary of the British and Foreign Anti-Slavery Society. Estlin arranged for the letters to be made public.

In 1867 she helped establish the Bristol Women's Suffrage Society in which she acted as a treasurer.

In 1868 she travelled to America, where she met other leading activists including Lucretia Mott and Susan B. Anthony.

During 1870-1886 she was a member of the executive committee of the Ladies' National Association. This organization co-ordinated the feminist campaign for the repeal of the Contagious Diseases Acts. There was a schism within the abolitionists between the radical views of William Lloyd Garrison and the more conservative position of the British and Foreign Anti-Slavery Society, who was content to see a gradual end to slavery. Eliza Wigham and Jane Smeal of the Edinburgh Ladies' Emancipation Society supported Estlin's initiative to find common ground between the Garrisonians and the BFASS.

Estlin was among the signatories of a supportive letter sent to the first meeting of the International Council of Women, which was held in 1888 in America. Other signers included Margaret Tanner, Helen Priestman Bright Clark, Emily Sturge, Maria Colby and Louisa Swann, all under the title "In the Fellowship of Womanhood."

Mary Anne Estelin died aged 82 on 14 November 1902 in her residence, 36 Upper Belgrave Road, Clifton, Bristol.
