= Agnes McLaren =

British doctor (1837–1913)

Agnes McLaren FRCPI, TOSD
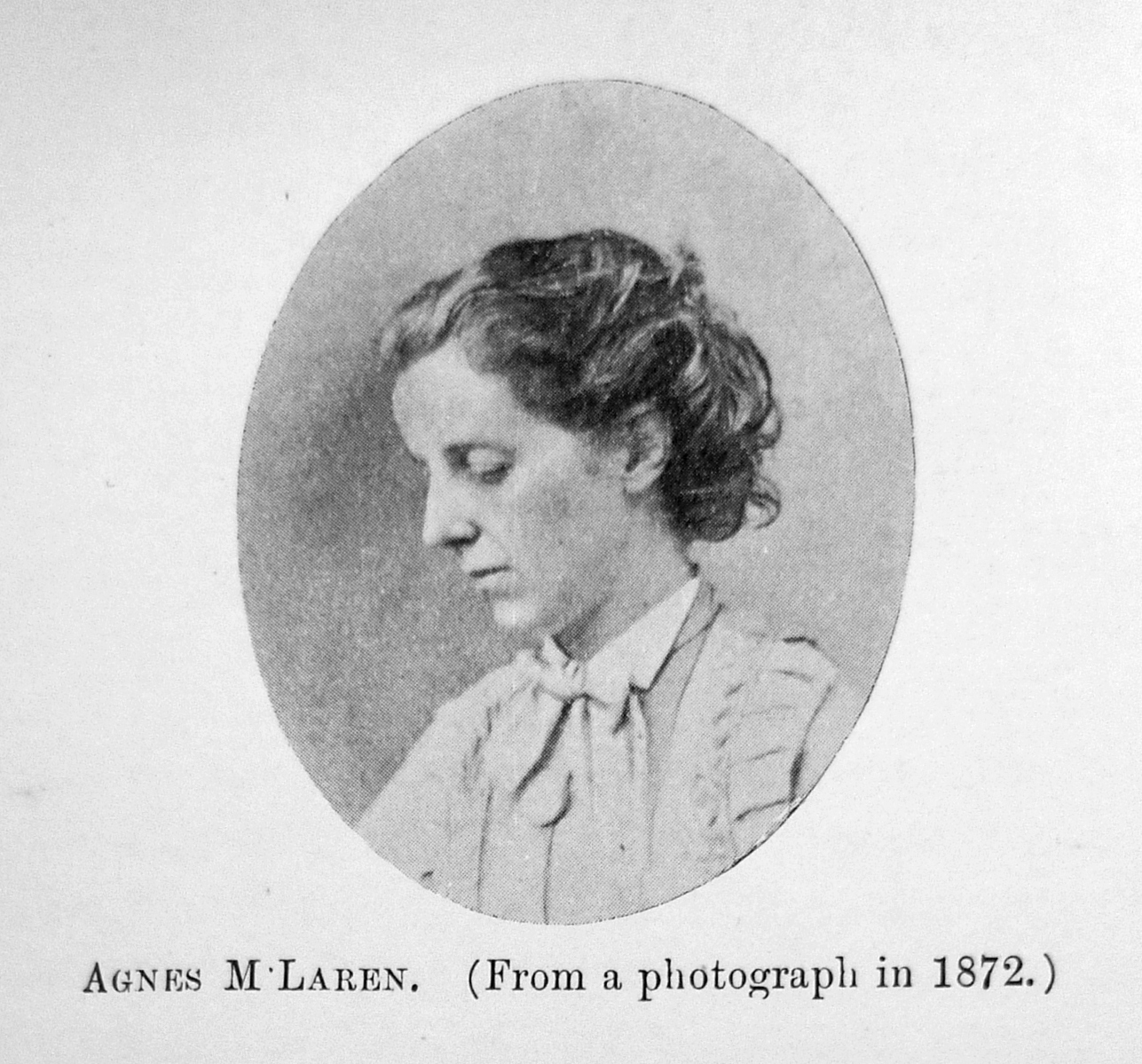
- McLaren in 1872
- Born: 1837; Edinburgh, Scotland
- Died: 1913 (aged 75–76); Antibes, France
- Education: Studied medicine University of Montpellier
- Known for: medical work with women and children in India, and for women's suffrage activism
- Awards: Fellow of the Royal College of Physicians of Ireland

Agnes McLaren (4 July 1837 – 17 April 1913) FRCPI was a Scottish doctor who was one of the first to give medical assistance to women in India who, because of custom, were unable to access medical help from male doctors. Agnes was active in social justice causes including protests against the white slave trade. She signed the 1866 women's suffrage petition and was secretary of the Edinburgh National Society for Women's Suffrage alongside her stepmother, Priscilla Bright McLaren. In 1873 she travelled with Priscilla and Jane Taylour to give suffrage lectures in Orkney and Shetland. Her father had supported the campaign of the first women who sought to study medicine at University of Edinburgh and Agnes became friends with Sophia Jex-Blake, one of the Edinburgh Seven. Her father did not, however, support Agnes' own ambitions in this area. And as she could not graduate in medicine in Scotland, she went to study in France and later, in order to be permitted to practice at home, became a member of the Royal College of Dublin.

She was based with the Franciscan Hospital Sisters when in training, and later converted to Catholicism and went on to carry out missionary work even though Roman Catholic law still prevented its sisters-in-vows from being doctors until 1936.

== Background ==
McLaren was born in Edinburgh, Scotland. The daughter of Duncan McLaren, a Presbyterian businessman and prominent liberal politician, by his second marriage. Her mother died when she was only three years old. Her father's third wife was Priscilla Bright and in time they would work together.

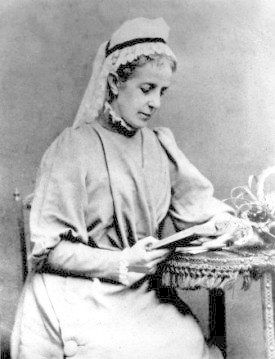
Agnes McLaren

She entered the school of medicine at the University of Montpellier in 1876, eventually becoming only the tenth woman in Britain to graduate as a doctor. In 1877 she sat on the governing body of the London School of Medicine for Women. She was a visiting physician at the Cannongate Medical Mission Dispensary in Edinburgh. By 1882, she was also Fellow of the Royal College of Physicians of Ireland, and had a practice in Cannes. She would spend the summers in Edinburgh and relocate to France in the winter.

== India ==
In 1898 aged 61, she converted to the Roman Catholic Church, and later went to Rawalpindi, northern India (now Pakistan) with a Catholic mission, she had learned of the tremendous health needs of women in India. Because of India's custom of seclusion for women (purdah), they could not be seen by men other than their immediate family, a custom which meant they also could not receive medical care from male physicians. With so few women doctors in the early 1900s, literally thousands of women died in illness or in childbirth each year and many babies also died in infancy. McLaren responded to this problem by establishing the London Committee, a support group of women which helped finance the opening of a small hospital, St. Catherine's Hospital, in Rawalpindi.

During her search for women who could help run the hospital, McLaren discovered that Catholic Canon Law prohibited Religious Sisters from giving this level of medical care. She petitioned the Pope and Holy See to lift the restriction and, while waiting for a response, continued looking for women interested in health care abroad. Anna Maria Dengel, an Austrian, responded to McLaren's request, but was never able to meet McLaren, who died shortly after their correspondence began. However, before her death, McLaren encouraged Dengel to study medicine at the Cork University, setting into motion Dengel's becoming a physician and, years later, her starting a new religious congregation, the Medical Mission Sisters. They are a Catholic congregation of Sisters who are trained as doctors and nurses and other forms of healthcare professionals, dedicated to providing healthcare to women and children around the world. In 1915, after reading a biographical pamphlet about McLaren's life, Australian doctor Mary Glowrey experienced a vocation to work as a medical missionary in Guntur, India. Mary Glowrey received special permission from Pope Benedict XV to work as a medical doctor and Religious Sister in 1920.

McLaren died in 1913 and was buried in Antibes, France. Her obituary in the British Medical Journal describes her as "a woman of strong individuality and character, known to a large circle of philanthropic workers of many nations, many kindreds and many creeds."
