= Mary Lloyd (abolitionist) =

British joint secretary of the first Ladies Anti-Slavery Society

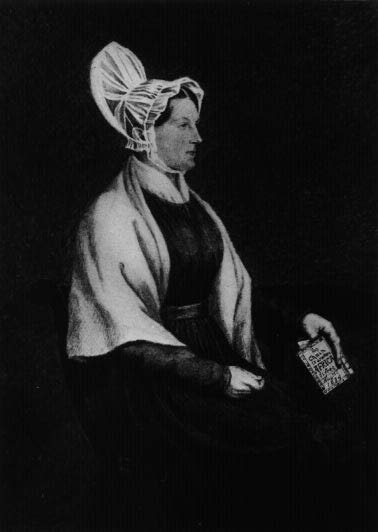
- 1839 portrait of Mary Lloyd. The book she holds reads "The Chain is broken Africa is free Aug 21st 1839"
- Born: 12 March 1795; Falmouth
- Died: 25 January 1865 (aged 69); Wood Green
- Occupation: Abolitionist
- Spouse(s): Samuel Lloyd
- Children: Mary Lloyd

Mary Lloyd or Mary Hornchurch (12 March 1795 – 25 January 1865) was a British joint secretary of the first Ladies Anti-Slavery Society, founded as the Birmingham Ladies Society for the Relief of Negro Slaves.

== Life ==
Mary Hornchurch was born in Falmouth in 1795 into a Quaker family. Her mother was a minister in the Society of Friends and her father was a cooper. Mary's mother died whilst she was a child and she quickly became the carer for her father when he became ill until her died in 1818. Mary was cared for by friends until she married Samuel Lloyd (1795–1862) on 12 November 1823. Samuel was to support his wife as she campaigned against slavery.

In 1823, the Anti-Slavery Society was founded. Members included Lloyd, Jane Smeal, Elizabeth Pease, Joseph Sturge, Thomas Clarkson, William Wilberforce, Henry Brougham, Thomas Fowell Buxton, Elizabeth Heyrick and Anne Knight.

Lucy Townsend founded the first Ladies Anti-Slavery Society in Birmingham, West Midlands, on 8 April 1825. She and Lloyd were the first joint secretaries of what was at first called the Birmingham and West Bromwich Ladies Society for the Relief of Negro Slaves, also known as Birmingham Ladies Society for the Relief of Negro Slaves, and around 1830, it became the Female Society for Birmingham. Other founding members included Elizabeth Heyrick, Sophia Sturge and Sarah Wedgwood.

By 1831, there were over seventy similar anti-slavery organisations. Townsend's organisation was publicised in America and it became a role model for similar organisations in the USA.

Whilst she was in Birmingham she started an organisation to assist deaf-mutes with Lucy Townsend. Lloyd continued as Honorary secretary when Townsend resigned when she moved to Thorpe in Nottinghamshire in 1836. Townsend remained as a committee member and Lloyd was secretary and later treasurer in the 1840s. In 1841 she became a minister in the Society of Friends and this required her to speak and travel around England.

For many years these anti-slavery organisations, that were run by women, were dismissed as of marginal interest, but recent research has revealed that these groups had a distinct and national impact. These organisations were frequently more radical and they introduced new methods of raising awareness and pressure. These organisations organised campaigns to not purchase sugar and other products of slaves.

Lloyd died in Wood Green in 1865.

== Legacy ==
Lloyd and her husband were buried in the grounds of the Quaker meeting house in Bull Street in Birmingham. There remains were later moved but there is a plaque to their memory at the meeting house.
