= Sarah Wedgwood =

English abolitionist (1776–1856)

- Born: 25 September 1776; Etruria, Staffordshire, England
- Died: 6 November 1856 (aged 80)
- Occupation: Abolitionist
- Parent(s): Josiah Wedgwood; Sarah Wedgwood
- Family: Darwin–Wedgwood family

Sarah Wedgwood (25 September 1776 – 1856) was an English abolitionist and charity administrator.

== Early life ==
She was born 25 September 1776 as the sixth surviving child of Josiah and Sarah Wedgwood while the family was living at Etruria Hall. The Wedgwoods' involvement with the abolition movement began when she was a child, with the Wedgwood anti-slavery medallion coming out in 1787. In 1805 she began living at Parkfields, Barlaston, with her elder sister Catherine, where both sisters contributed monetarily to the abolition movement. After the death of Catherine in 1823, she lived at Camp Hill, Maer Heath, Staffordshire.

== Abolition campaigning ==
In 1825 she was a founding member of the Birmingham Ladies Society for the Relief of Negro Slaves (later called the Female Society for Birmingham), along with Lucy Townsend, Elizabeth Heyrick, Mary Lloyd, and Sophia Sturge. The group 'promoted the sugar boycott, targeting shops as well as shoppers, visiting thousands of homes and distributing pamphlets, calling meetings and drawing petitions.' Sarah served as the group's district treasurer.

She is probably the 'Miss Wedgwood' who published the pamphlet British Slavery Described to raise funds for the North Staffs Ladies' Anti-Slavery Society in 1828.

She was opposed to gradual abolition, writing in an 1830 letter to Anne Knight:

'If the battle might be between emancipation and slavery only there would be some hope; but this 3rd thing that looks like emancipation and is not, is I fear beguiling so many that it will very much weaken the true cause.'

In 1832, she pledged £100 to the Anti-Slavery Society towards a plan for immediate emancipation.

== Later life ==
In 1846 she moved to Petleys, Down, Kent, to live near her niece, Emma Darwin. In the final decade of her life, she is described by her great-niece, Henrietta Litchfield:

'She was tall, upright, and very thin…Her life was one of Spartan simplicity. She lived in her books, and the administration of her charities, and her only society was that of my mother and a few old friends and relations.'

She died 6th November 1856, leaving thousands of pounds to over a dozen charities in her will.
