= St Lawrence's Church, Thorpe =

Coordinates: 53°02′33″N 00°51′27″W

St. Lawrence's Church, Thorpe
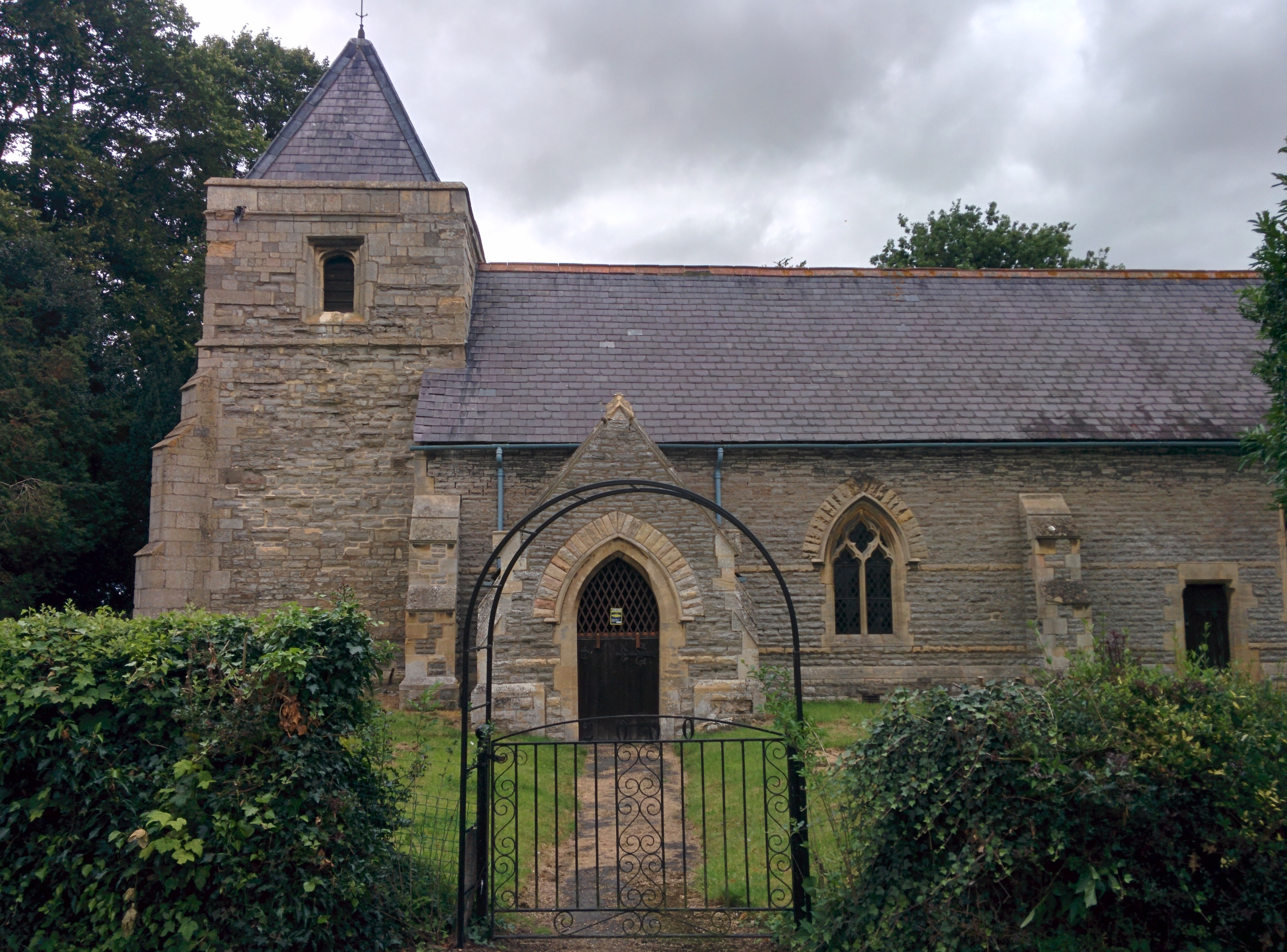
- St Lawrence's in 2015.
- St. Lawrence's Church, Thorpe
- Denomination: Church of England
- Churchmanship: Broad Church
- Website: www.farndon-hawton.org.uk

History
- Dedication: St. Lawrence

Administration
- Province: York
- Diocese: Southwell and Nottingham
- Parish: Thorpe, Nottinghamshire

Clergy
- Rector: Rev Elizabeth Murray

St. Lawrence's Church, Thorpe is a parish church in the Church of England in Thorpe, Nottinghamshire.

The church is Grade II listed by the Department for Digital, Culture, Media and Sport as it is a building of special architectural or historic interest. The abolitionist Lucy Townsend lived at the rectory with her husband and they are both buried here.

== History ==
The small church is that of St. Laurence, "a parish, in the union of Southwell, S. division of the wapentake of Newark and of the county of Nottingham, 3 miles (S. W.) from Newark; containing 108 inhabitants."

St. Laurence's church is "a picturesque village church, which was much restored by the rector Rev. William Wood during the Victorian period. He also built the rectory through whose grounds one has to go in order to gain access to the church. The solid tower remains from the 12th century."

"Some of the clergy of this parish include Mr Paget, rector 1587-89; Thomas Colman, rector 1591, Isaac Sharpe, rector 1598-1613, and John Scarlett, rector 1624-39.", John Quarrell (who is buried here_

"The church, dedicated to St. Lawrence, is a small structure, upon an eminence, and has (had) 40 acres (160,000 m^{2}) of glebe. The rectory, valued in the King's books at £8, now £280, is in the patronage of the Lord Chancellor, and the Rev. Charles Townsend M.A. is the incumbent, who resides at the rectory, a neat, modern, brick mansion near the church."

Lucy Townsend was the incumbent's wife from 1836. She was a leading campaigner against slavery and she died in Thorpe in 1847. She is buried in a large fenced grave to the left of the entrance. The stone records that she "ceased to be mortal" in 1847. Her husband died later, and is buried here too.

== Current parish status ==
It is in the United Benefice of Farndon with Thorpe and Hawton with Cotham:

- All Saints' Church, Hawton
- St. Lawrence's Church, Thorpe
- St. Peter's Church, Farndon
- St. Michael's Church, Cotham

In 2015 services were being held here every few months. The church can be visited via a footpath through the drive of the ex-rectory.

== See also ==
- Listed buildings in Thorpe, Nottinghamshire
