= Lucy Townsend =

British abolitionist

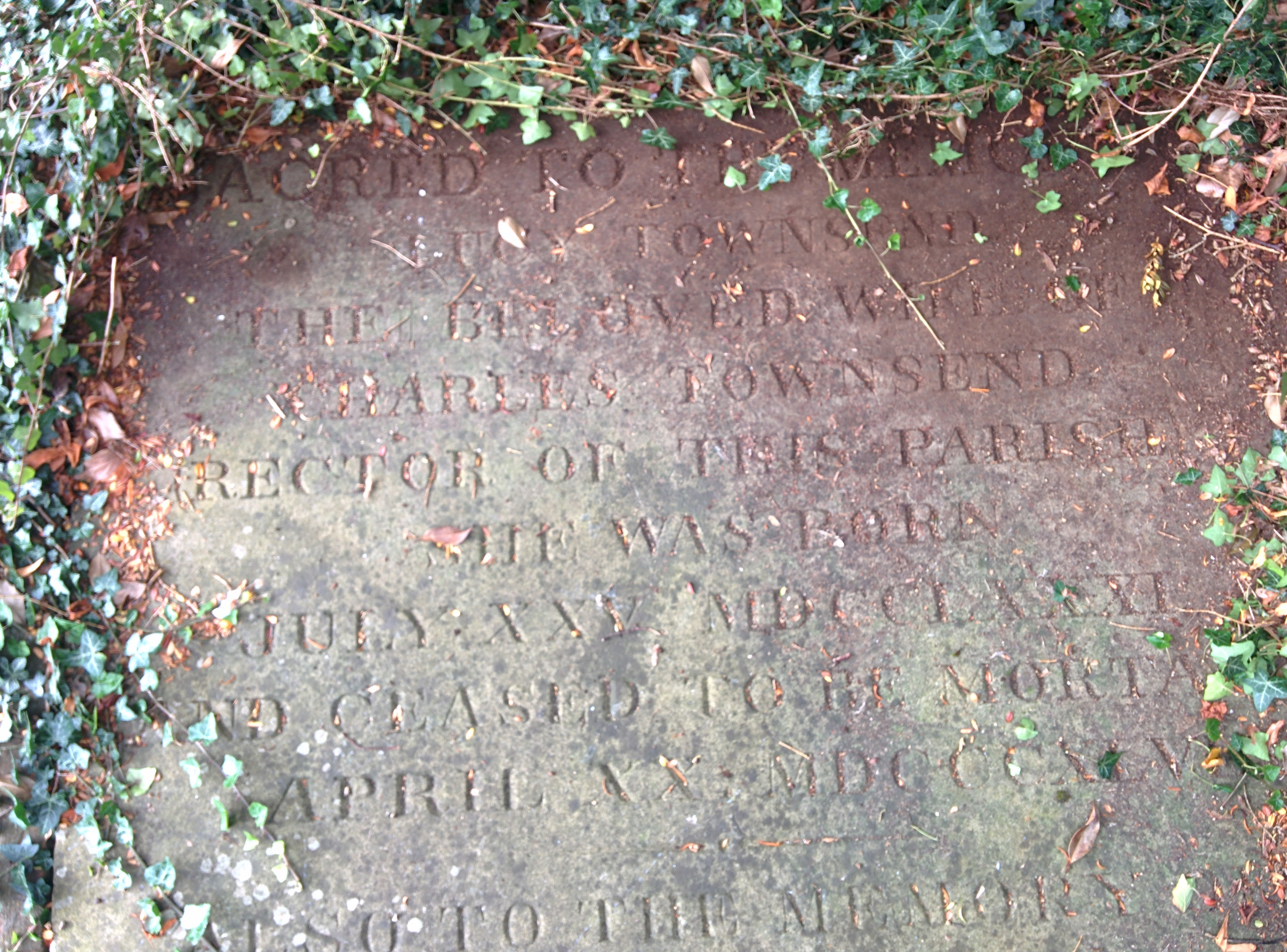
- Lucy and Charles Townsend's grave
- Born: Lucy Jesse; 25 July 1781; England
- Died: 20 April 1847 (aged 65); Thorpe, Nottinghamshire, England
- Known for: Abolitionist
- Spouse: Rev. Charles Townsend
- Children: 6
- Parent: William Jesse

Lucy Townsend (née Jesse; 25 July 1781 – 20 April 1847) was a British abolitionist. She started the first Ladies' Anti-Slavery Society in Birmingham, UK, titled the Birmingham Ladies Society for the Relief of Negro Slaves. Although the British slave trade had been abolished 1807, her society was a model for others in Britain and America which campaigned to end slavery in the British West Indies and the US. The British Ladies' Society's role in abolitionism is considered to have had an international impact.

== Life ==
Townsend's family came from Staffordshire. Her father, William Jesse, was the evangelical incumbent at All Saints Church in West Bromwich. In 1807 she married Rev. Charles Townsend, who was the curate of West Bromwich and a campaigner against slavery. They became the parents of six children and they were both opposed to cruel sports as well as slavery.

"I am very anxious that the historical picture now in the hands of Haydon should not be performed without the chief lady of the history being there in justice to history and posterity the person who established (women's anti-slavery groups). You have as much right to be there as Thomas Clarkson himself, nay perhaps more, his achievement was in the slave trade; thine was slavery itself the pervading movement."

— Anne Knight

Townsend founded the first Ladies' Anti-Slavery Society in Birmingham on 8 April 1825. She and Mary Lloyd were the first joint secretaries of what was at first called The Ladies' Society for the Relief of Negro Slaves. Other founding members included Elizabeth Heyrick, Sophia Sturge and Sarah Wedgwood (daughter of Josiah Wedgwood). By 1831 there were over seventy similar anti-slavery organisations. Townsend's organisation was publicised in America and it became a model for similar organisations in the USA. Townsend published To the Law and to the Testimony in support of anti-slavery in 1832.

Whilst she was in Birmingham she started an organisation to assist deaf-mutes with Mary Lloyd. In 1836 Townsend moved to Thorpe in Nottinghamshire. She gave up the job of honorary secretary, but remained as a committee member.

1840 World Anti-Slavery Convention. Move your cursor to identify delegates but you will not find Townsend.

The role of abolitionist women in Britain was independent. For many years these anti-slavery organisations, which were run by women, were dismissed as of marginal interest, but recent research has revealed that these groups had a distinct and national impact.

Townsend's organisation was not affiliated with any national organisation, neither was it a partner organisation for Birmingham's (men's) Anti-Slavery Organisation. In fact women like Elizabeth Heyrick, Eliza Wigham and Jane Smeal believed that slavery should not be gradually abolished but it should be immediately abolished. The Sheffield organisation was the first Anti-Slavery organisation in Britain to propose an immediate end to slavery. Conversely Townsend's organisation took a more conservative line in 1839 when they followed the British and Foreign Anti-Slavery Society's policy of supporting a more gradual move.

Townsend attended the World Anti-Slavery Convention in 1840. Anne Knight who was also a delegate encouraged Townsend to volunteer to be included in the large painting of all the notable delegates because she was "the chief lady" of the campaign for anti-slavery. Knight was included, but Townsend was not. There is no known picture of what Townsend looked like. At the convention she would meet women who represented other leading ladies' organisations. Eliza Wigham was there representing the Edinburgh Ladies' Emancipation Society, Mary Anne Rawson was from the Sheffield Society; Jane Smeal from Glasgow; Amelia Opie from Norwich; Elizabeth Pease from Darlington and Anne Knight from Chelmsford.

Townsend lived at the rectory where her husband was the clergyman at St. Lawrence's Church. She died in Thorpe in 1847. Townsend was survived by her husband and there is a brass memorial to her and her husband in the church.
