= Farndon, Nottinghamshire =

Village in Nottinghamshire, England

Coordinates: 53.059°N 0.851°W

Farndon
- Village and civil parish
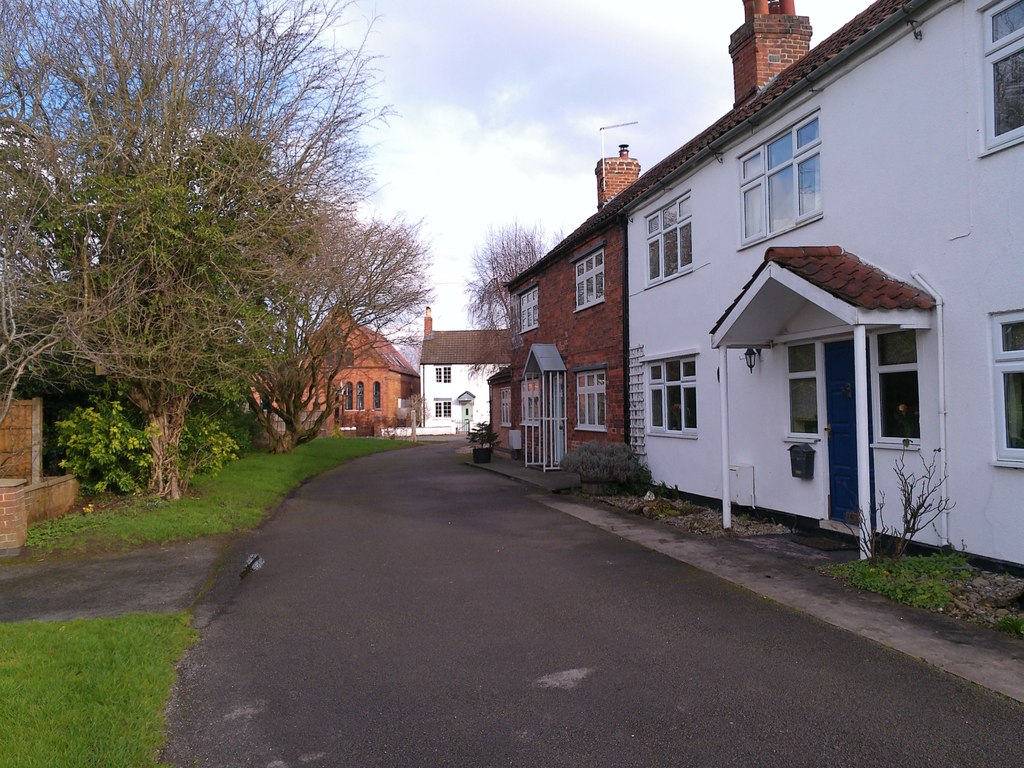
- Chapel Lane

- Location within Nottinghamshire
- Interactive map of Farndon
- Area: 2.75 sq mi (7.1 km^{2})
- Population: 2,479 (2021)
  - Density: 901/sq mi (348/km^{2})
- OS grid reference: SK 769518
  - London: 110 mi (180 km) SSE
- District: Newark and Sherwood
- Shire county: Nottinghamshire
- Region: East Midlands
- Country: England
- Sovereign state: United Kingdom
- Post town: NEWARK
- Postcode district: NG24
- Dialling code: 01636
- Police: Nottinghamshire
- Fire: Nottinghamshire
- Ambulance: East Midlands
- UK Parliament: Newark
- Website: www.farndonpcnotts.co.uk

Farndon is a small village and civil parish in the Newark and Sherwood district of Nottinghamshire, England. It lies along the historic Fosse road on the banks of the River Trent and is 3 miles (4 km) south-west of Newark-on-Trent. The population of the civil parish as of the 2011 census was 2,405, this increased to 2,479 at the 2021 census. The A46 road previously ran through the village until the development of a new dual carriageway bypass.

== History ==
The name Farndon means "Fern Hill". It was once thought to be the site of the Roman fort Ad Pontem or "the place by the bridges." However, this site is now known to be further south near East Stoke.

The village played a small part in the English Civil War. During the Siege of Newark in 1646, Farndon was occupied by a Parliamentarian regiment led by Sydnam Poyntz. In the same year, partially as a result of Poyntz inviting local people to dismantle Newark's Royalist defences and slight the castle, a plague which had previously been contained in the town ended up killing an estimated 25% of Farndon's population.

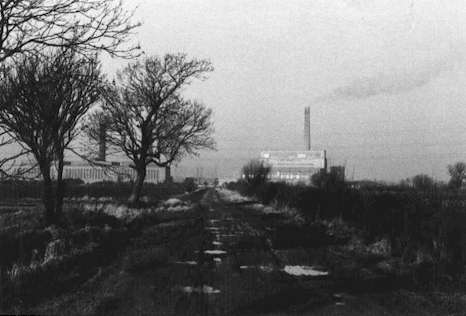
Photograph of Farndon taken in 1973 from the north end of Marsh Lane looking west showing Staythorpe power station

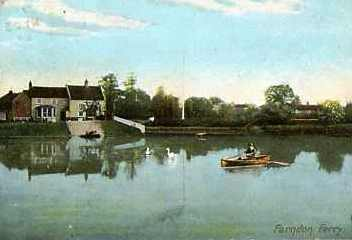
Farndon ferry in a postcard of 1907 showing white frontage of Britannia Inn

In the 19th century, farming, malting, willow growing and basket making were the main source of employment for men and women. There was also a village blacksmith, butcher, baker, a general store, and a cobbler. Francis White's Directory of Nottinghamshire described Farndon in 1853 as follows:

"Farndon is a well built village and parish on the Trent, 2 miles (3 km) west-south-west of Newark, and contains 590 inhabitants and 1,710 acres (690 ha) of land, mostly freehold, a small part copyhold and leasehold. The principal proprietors are William Buck Esq. and W.R. Brockton Esq. There are also several smaller owners. The Duke of Newcastle is lord of the manor, but owns only a small portion of the land. The church, dedicated to St Peter, is a large and lofty edifice, with two side aisles, chancel and tower, in which are 4 bells. A good organ was put up in the church in 1851...on the Trent side in this parish are several malt kilns, also steam and wind mills. The Wesleyans and Primitive Methodists each have a chapel here."

In the 1930s sand and gravel was needed to build aerodrome runways at RAF Syerston and RAF Newton. Excavations on parts of the river bank revealed ample supplies. Today, those worked gravel pits have been transformed into a marina, the river widened and the marshy fields alongside drained.

=== St Peter's Church ===
The parish church of St. Peter was built in Elizabethan times, and is thought to be the third such church built on the same site since Saxon times.

=== Farndon Ferry ===
Until 1974, "there used to be a ferry across the Trent from Farndon to Rolleston."

In August 1948, "the title of Little Hero of Farndon was bestowed on 12-year-old Ronnie Ward, of Northgate, Newark, after he rescued a child from the River Devon by the Farndon Ferry on Thursday. Seeing the four-year-old boy in deep water, Ronnie swam out to him and pulled him to the landing ste from where he was carried back to his mother. Amazingly, Ronnie's parents knew nothing about the rescue until they heard the story from eye-witnesses, because their son was too modest to tell them."

=== Farndon Fields ===
During site investigations for the A46 road improvements in the area to the east of the existing Fosse road (the former Roman Fosse Way), a significant Late Upper Palaeolithic archaeological site was identified, and later excavated at Farndon fields.

The site contained a flint scatter, a spread of waste flakes produced by the working of stone using flint knapping to produce sharp edged tools. Dated by the use of Optically stimulated luminescence, it confirmed that the archaeology dated back some 13,000 years making it a rare open field site, as finds from this age were usually only found in caves, such as Gough's Cave and more locally at Creswell Crags, some 20 miles away. It is thought plausible that the same people who used this site also visited the caves at Creswell, and that the repeated visits to Farndon were part of their nomadic subsistence circuit during the year.

The finds at Creswell, showed that these hunters were also artists decorating both the caves and animal bone with depictions of horses, Ibex and other animals, the Robin Hood Cave Horse being one of the notable discoveries of this Creswellian culture.

Describing the finds at Farndon, as "the dream scenario" archaeologist Phil Harding, who is also an expert in shaping stone tools, said "As a flint knapper, you were there with them". It has been imagined that the hunters who produced the scatter, needed to use the new flint tools to flense animal carcasses at this seasonal camp, situated on a river terrace overlooking the River Devon near to its confluence with the River Trent.

=== Flora and fauna ===
There are a number of sites in Farndon dedicated to nature conservation. Most notable amongst these is the Willow Holt, which is one of the few remaining survivors of the working willow holts that were a feature of many Trentside villages. The site is especially important because it houses an internationally known collection of willows and hybrid species. Part of the riverbank is raised and forms a flood bank, either side of which is an interesting selection of cricket bat willows and hybrid balasam poplars. Wild flowers include meadow cranesbill, comfrey, angelica and meadowsweet and the water meadows host species such as Yorkshire fog, brown bent and cocksfoot. The site is now in the ownership of the Nottinghamshire Wildlife Trust, and is open to the public. Prior to this, the Holt was in the care of Brenda and Lever Howitt, two renowned Willow conservationists.

== Amenities ==
The village has a shop which includes a sub-post office, two pubs and a hairdressers. There is also a primary school, Farndon St Peter's, which is in the middle of the village. It replaced the old school c.1960. The headmaster who oversaw the transition between sites was Bernard Jackson known to generations of Farndon schoolchildren as 'Gaffer' Jackson. Gaffer's teaching mostly stressed English and Maths.

== Sport ==
Farndon United Football Club which was started in 1970, played in the Newark Football Alliance League. In the 2005/06 season they won the treble becoming league champions and winning the Willie Hall and Sam Arnold Cups. This feat had only previously been achieved by league rivals the New Inn and the RHP Sports & Social football team. In 2015, the club's first team folded.

The first known reference to a Farndon cricket team is 1853. In 1901, Farndon won the prestigious Ransome Cup. Throughout this period, Farndon played at various locations around the village. Eventually, there was a fixed ground established in a field just off School Lane. By the end of the 1960s, Farndon established a permanent spot for a ground, moving onto a playing field at the back of the Memorial Hall along Marsh Lane, where a pavilion was opened by Nottinghamshire stalwart Frank Woodhead in 1973. Farndon achieved prolific success throughout the 1970s, winning the Newark Cricket Alliance Division 1 three times. They currently play in the South Notts Cricket League. In 2023, the club built a new state-of-the-art pavilion.

== Notable people ==
- William Bissill (1871-1936) — National Hunt horse racing jockey who rode in two Grand Nationals, coming second in the 1908 race. He is buried in Farndon Municipal Cemetery.
- Jessie Bond (1853–1942) — English singer and actress best known for her role in the Gilbert and Sullivan comic operas, lived in Farndon.
- William Rippon Brockton (1838-1915) — 19th century horse racing jockey who came third in the 1870 Grand National, was champion National Hunt Jockey in 1880 and won the first Scottish Grand National in the same year. Brockton was born in Farndon and is buried in Farndon Municipal Cemetery.
- Graeme Davies (1937-2022) — New Zealand born engineer, academic and administrator who lived in Farndon.
- Mark Fell (1960-) — English cricketer who played first-class cricket for Nottinghamshire and Derbyshire between 1981 and 1985.
- Richard Howitt (1864-1951) — English cricketer who played first-class cricket for Nottinghamshire between 1893 and 1901. Howitt died in Farndon and is buried in Farndon Municipal Cemetery.
- Patrick Huskinson (1897-1966) — RAF officer and fighting ace who became Director of RAF Armament Production during WWII and was born in Farndon.
- Brough Maltby (1826-1894) — Archdeacon of Nottingham who was vicar of St Peter's Church from 1864 until his death.
- George Nicholls (1781-1865) — Poor Law Commissioner who lived in Farndon between 1816 and 1819.
- Jay McGuiness (1990-) — British singer, songwriter and actor who comes from Farndon.
- Somerset Walpole (1854-1929) — Anglican priest, bishop, teacher and author. Born in Balderton, up until the age of ten his father Robert Seymour Walpole was the Vicar of Farndon and Balderton.

== See also ==
- Listed buildings in Farndon, Nottinghamshire
