= Listed buildings in Hawton =

Hawton is a civil parish in the Newark and Sherwood district of Nottinghamshire, England. The parish contains two listed buildings that are recorded in the National Heritage List for England. Of these, one is listed at Grade I, the highest of the three grades, and the other is at Grade II, the lowest grade. The parish contains the village of Hawton and the surrounding countryside, and the listed buildings consist of a church and a former gypsum grinding mill.

== Key ==
Grade	Criteria
I	Buildings of exceptional interest, sometimes considered to be internationally important
II	Buildings of national importance and special interest

== Buildings ==
Name and location	Photograph	Date	Notes	Grade
All Saints' Church; 53.05173°N 0.82541°W		13th century	The church has been altered and extended during the centuries, including a restoration in about 1880, and an extension in 1887. It is built in stone with slate roofs, and consists of a nave with a clerestory, north and south aisles, a south porch, a chancel and a west tower. The tower has five stages on a plinth, with clasping buttresses, string courses, a west arched doorway with a moulded surround and carved shields and heads in the spandrels, and a hood mould, and above it is a four-light window. The bell openings have two lights, above which is a frieze of shields, corner gargoyles, and an embattled parapet with eight merlons rising to from crocketed pinnacles. The body of the church is also embattled, and inside the church is an Easter Sepulchre.	I
Gypsum Grinding Mill; 53.04743°N 0.80590°W		Late 19th century	The former gypsum grinding mill, now a ruin, is in red brick, with decoration in blue and buff brick. There are two storeys, and it contains window with semicircular-arched heads and cast iron frames.	II
