= All Saints' Church, Hawton =

Coordinates: 53°03′05″N 00°49′33″W

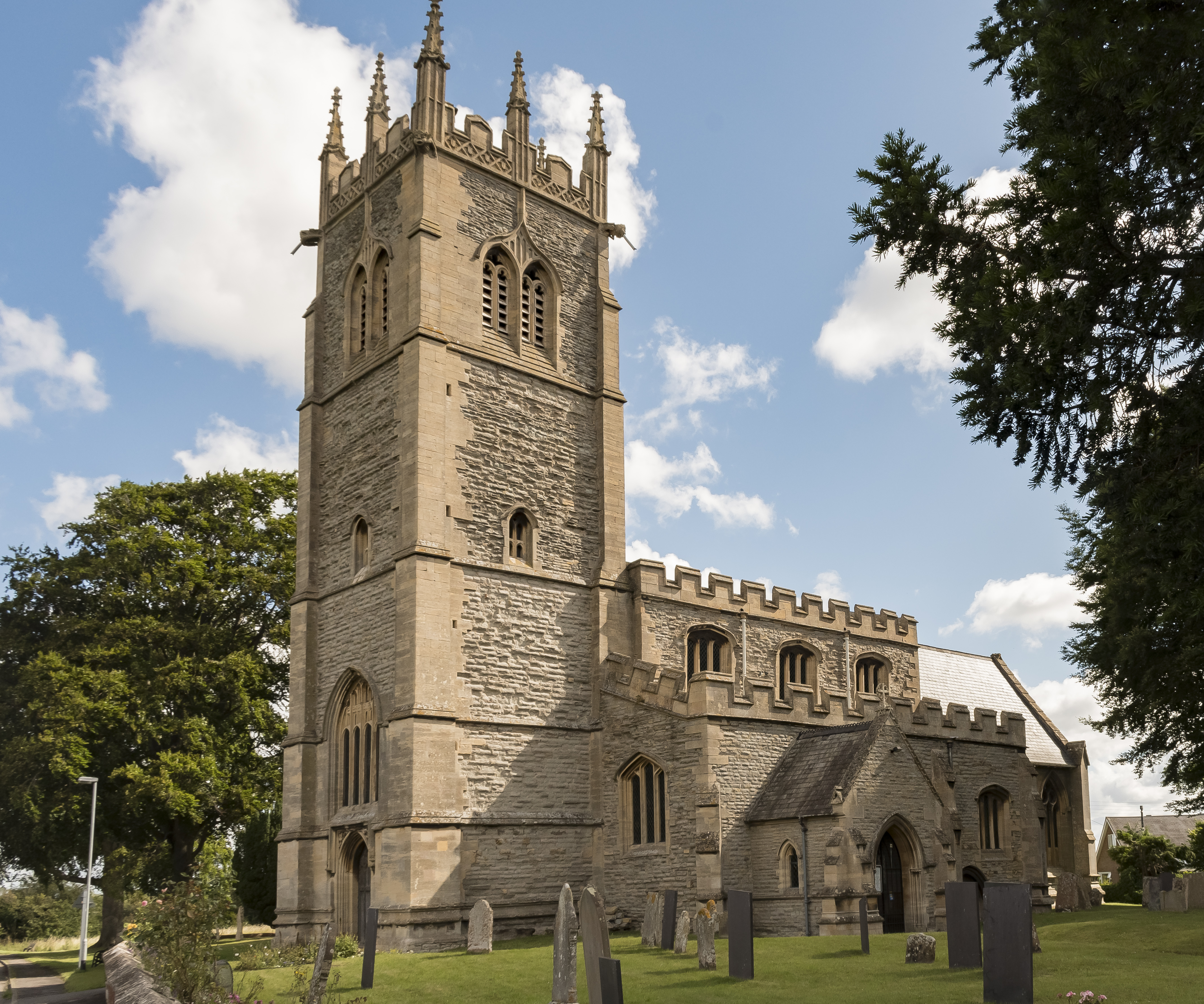
- All Saints' Church, Hawton
- All Saints' Church, Hawton
- Denomination: Church of England
- Churchmanship: Broad Church

History
- Dedication: All Saints

Administration
- Province: York
- Diocese: Southwell and Nottingham
- Parish: Hawton

Clergy
- Rector: Rev David Milner

All Saints' Church, Hawton, is a parish church in the Church of England in Hawton, Nottinghamshire.

The church is Grade I listed by the Department for Digital, Culture, Media and Sport as a building of outstanding architectural or historic interest.

== History ==
The church is medieval and the chancel is described by Nikolaus Pevsner as "one of the most exciting pieces of architecture in the country."

On the north side of the chancel is a medieval Easter Sepulchre. Opposite on the south side is the sedilia. The carvings on these two features are considered amongst the best in England.

The carvings in the chancel are thought to be the work of stonemasons who worked on the choir screen and Chapter House in Southwell Minster.

=== Easter Sepulchre ===
Most famous is the Easter Sepulchre, which would have been used to reserve the consecrated bread and wine between Maundy Thursday and Easter Day, during which period there would have been no celebration of Holy Communion, and the consecrated elements would have been reserved in the Sepulchre. The carvings depict at the base the sleeping Roman soldiers guarding the tomb of Christ, at the top are the apostles gazing heavenward at his ascending feet. In between is the risen Christ, the graveclothes draped over his shoulder. The glorious stonemasonry suffered at the hands of Oliver Cromwell's men.

=== Sedilia ===
On the south wall of the chancel is the finely carved sedilia, stone seating originally provided for officiating clergy. At the very top are six saints standing on little men and animals, and crowned with angels. Lower are four female figures, then St Edward the Martyr, with a bishop on either side, and above on the left is St Peter and on the right St Nicholas. Further down still are two men on all fours gathering grapes among the foliage, and a pelican in her nest.

=== Memorial ===
- Sir Robert de Compton, died 1330

== United benefice ==
All Saints' Church, Hawton, belongs to the United Benefice of Farndon with Thorpe and Hawton with Cotham, along with St. Lawrence's Church, Thorpe, St. Peter's Church, Farndon and St. Michael's Church, Cotham.

== See also ==
- Grade I listed buildings in Nottinghamshire
- Listed buildings in Hawton
