= Hawton =

English hamlet near Newark-on-Trent, Nottinghamshire

Coordinates: 53.051°N 0.825°W

- Hamlet and civil parish
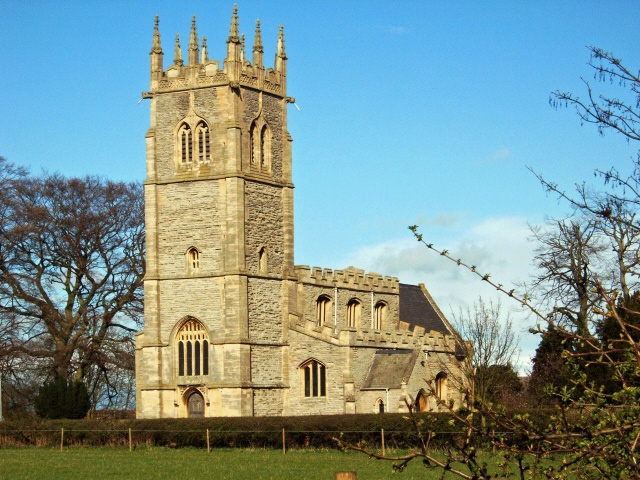
- All Saints' Church, Hawton

- Location within Nottinghamshire
- Interactive map of Hawton
- Area: 2.2 sq mi (5.7 km^{2})
- Population: 80 (2021)
  - Density: 36/sq mi (14/km^{2})
- OS grid reference: SK 788510
  - London: 110 mi (180 km) SSE
- District: Newark and Sherwood
- Shire county: Nottinghamshire
- Region: East Midlands
- Country: England
- Sovereign state: United Kingdom
- Post town: NEWARK
- Postcode district: NG24
- Dialling code: 01636
- Police: Nottinghamshire
- Fire: Nottinghamshire
- Ambulance: East Midlands
- UK Parliament: Newark

Hawton is a hamlet and civil parish in the Newark and Sherwood district of Nottinghamshire, England. It lies two miles (3.2 km) south of the town of Newark-on-Trent, near the River Devon, a tributary of the River Trent. Its population was recorded as 147 in the 2011 census (including Thorpe). Hawton alone reported 80 residents at the 2021 census.

== Historical role ==
Hawton played an important part in the English Civil War as a Roundhead encampment against the Royalist stronghold in Newark. Redoubt earthworks from that time are still visible in the village. The Grade I listed parish church of All Saints was erected in the 14th and 15th centuries.

In the early 14th century, the first manorial building was put up by the de Compton family on an earlier site in the demesne. Sir Thomas Molyneux added the clerestory and tower to the church, which boldly overlooks the flood plain of the River Trent. A branch of the Molyneux family, originally from Lancashire, lived at Hawton for several centuries.

== 19th-century description ==
"[Hawton,] 2 miles south-south-west of Newark, is a scattered village and parish pleasantly situated on the River Devon, comprising 227 inhabitants, and 2,150 acres (8.7 km^{2}) of land, mostly belonging to Robert Holden Esq., of Nuthall Temple. The Duke of Newcastle and Thomas Scales have small estates here, which was soc to Newark, to which this parish adjoins, near the extensive linen manufactory called Hawton's Mills. The church, dedicated to All Saints, is in the early style of English architecture, and contains some ancient monuments of the Molyneaux family, also a few handsome marble ones to the Holdens, whose family vault is here. In 1843 the chancel was thoroughly restored, and a new roof added. The whitewash, which for many years had obscured and disgraced the rich decoration and beautiful carving was taken away. On the south side are three stone stalls, and on the north a lofty arch, having deep and rich mouldings. Beneath is the effigy of a knight in armour. The rectory, valued in the King's books at £17 13s 4d, is in the gift of Charles Newdigate Newdegate Esq. The Rev. Pelly Parker M.A. is the incumbent. The tithes have been commuted for about £750."

== Parish church ==
See All Saints' Church, Hawton and also John Quarrell, The Story of Hawton Church, 66 pp., Newark & Sherwood District Council, 1994.

== See also ==
- Listed buildings in Hawton
