= Holy Sepulchre (disambiguation) =

The Church of the Holy Sepulchre is a church in the Christian Quarter of the Old City of Jerusalem, believed to be the site of Jesus Christ's empty tomb.

Holy Sepulchre, Saint Sepulchre, or variants, may also refer to:

== Places and jurisdictions ==
- St Sepulchre (parish), in London, England
- Sansepolcro, Arezzo, Tuscany, Italy
  - Roman Catholic Diocese of Sansepolcro
- Manor of St. Sepulchre, in Dublin, Ireland
  - St. Sepulchre's Palace, in Dublin, Ireland
- Neuvy-Saint-Sépulchre, Indre department, France

== Churches ==
=== England ===
- Church of the Holy Sepulchre, Cambridge
- The Holy Sepulchre, Northampton
- St Sepulchre-without-Newgate, City of London
- Holy Sepulchre Priory, Thetford
- Church of the Holy Sepulchre, Warminghurst

=== Italy ===
- Sansepolcro Cathedral, Sansepolcro
- Santo Stefano, Bologna
- Church of San Sepolcro, Milan
- Santo Sepolcro, Pisa
- San Sepolcro, Parma
- San Sepolcro, Piacenza
- Rucellai Sepulchre, or Chapel of the Holy Sepulchre, in the church of San Pancrazio, Florence

=== Other countries ===
- Saint-Sépulcre, Paris, France
- Monastery of Comendadoras Canonesas del Santo Sepulcro, Zaragoza, Spain
- Church of the Holy Sepulchre, Auckland, New Zealand
- Church of the Holy Sepulchre, Miechów, Poland

== People ==
- Dionigi di Borgo San Sepolcro (c. 1300–1342), Augustinian friar

== Religious organisations ==
- Canons Regular of the Holy Sepulchre, a Catholic religious order
- Canonesses Regular of the Holy Sepulchre, a Catholic female religious order
- Order of the Holy Sepulchre, a Catholic order of knighthood
- Fathers of the Holy Sepulchre, a group of Franciscan priests
- Brotherhood of the Holy Sepulchre, an Eastern Orthodox monastic fraternity
- Many places, especially in Spain, have rituals concerning the Holy Sepulchre during Holy Week, preceding Easter, and many confraternities include this in their name.

== See also ==
- Sepulchre (disambiguation)
- Tomb of Jesus
- Sansepolcrismo, the movement led by Mussolini that preceded Fascism
