= Richard Howitt (cricketer, born 1864) =

English cricketer

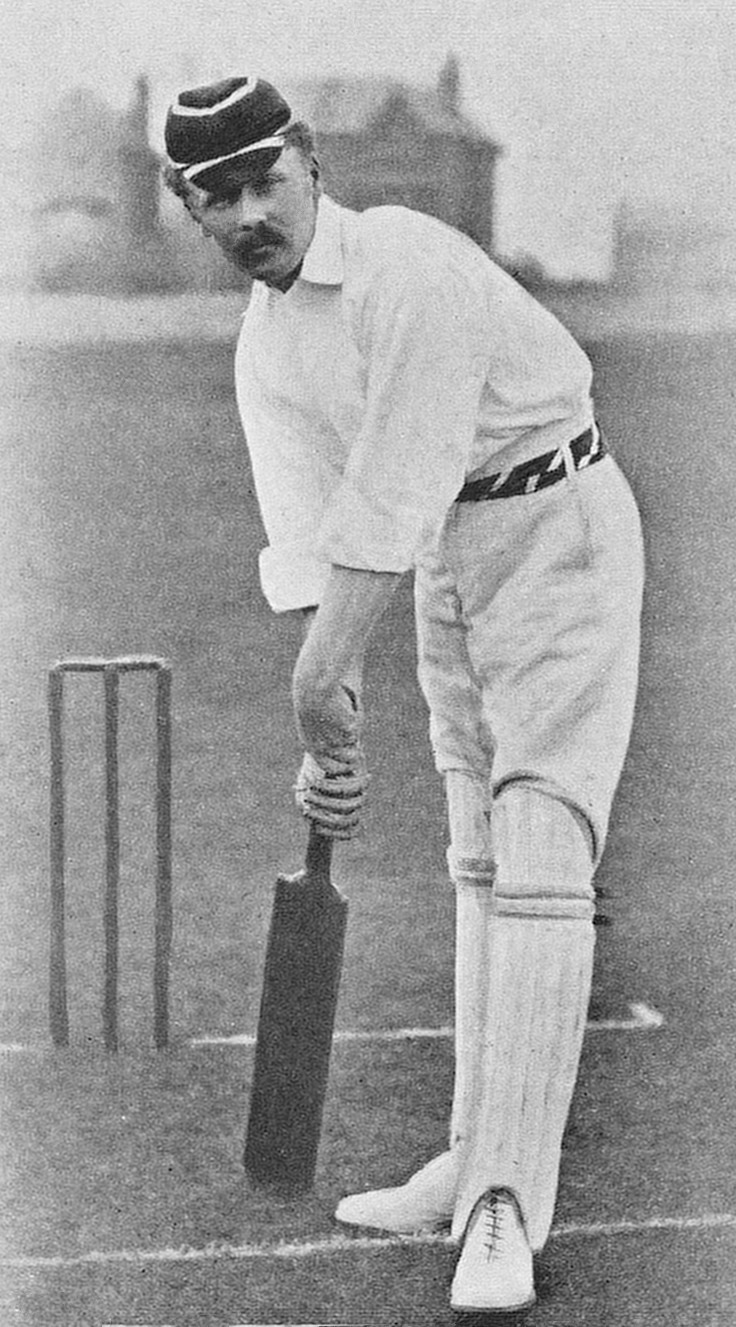

Personal information
- Full name: Richard Holmes Howitt
- Born: 21 July 1864; Farnsfield Grange, Nottinghamshire, England
- Died: 10 January 1951 (aged 86); Farndon, Nottinghamshire, England
- Batting: Right-handed
- Bowling: Medium

Domestic team information
- Years: Team
- 1893–1901: Nottinghamshire

Career statistics
Competition	First-class
Matches	28
Runs scored	492
Batting average	10.25
100s/50s	1/0
Top score	119
Balls bowled	650
Wickets	8
Bowling average	42.12
5 wickets in innings	0
10 wickets in match	0
Best bowling	2/25
Catches/stumpings	17/–
- Source: CricketArchive, 22 October 2012

Richard Holmes Howitt (21 July 1864 – 10 January 1951) was an English cricketer who played first-class cricket for Nottinghamshire from 1893 to 1901. He was born at Farnsfield Grange in Nottinghamshire in 1864.

== Cricket career ==
Howitt made his first-class debut in a match versus the Marylebone Cricket Club (MCC) in May, 1893. His top score of 119 was in a County Championship match for Nottinghamshire against Sussex in May, 1895. He died at Farndon, Nottinghamshire in 1951.
