= Sepulchre (disambiguation) =

A sepulchre is a type of tomb or burial chamber.

Sepulchre may also refer to:

- Sepulchre (comics), a fictional superhero
- Sepulchre (novel), by Kate Mosse, 2007

== See also ==
- Holy Sepulchre (disambiguation)
- Church of the Holy Sepulchre of Jesus, in Jerusalem
