= Mary Anne Rawson =

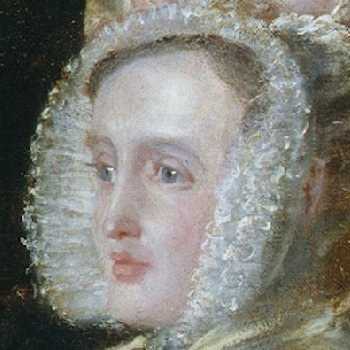
- Rawson in 1840.
- Born: Mary Anne Read; 1801; Sheffield, England
- Died: 1887 (aged 85–86)
- Occupation: Campaigner
- Known for: Abolitionism
- Spouse: William B. Rawson
- Parent(s): Joseph and Elizabeth Read

Mary Anne Rawson (1801–1887) was an abolitionist who also a campaigned with the Tract Society and the British and Foreign Bible Society, for Italian nationalism and against child labour. She was first involved with a Sheffield group, which successfully campaigned for people to boycott sugar from the West Indies, as it was produced by slave labour. She is pictured attending the World Anti-Slavery Convention in London in 1840.

== Early life ==
Mary Anne Read was born to Joseph Read (1774-1837), of Wincobank Hall in the Wincobank suburb of Sheffield, and his wife Elizabeth, wealthy parents who encouraged her involvement in good causes. Joseph Read had taken over his father's business- which would later become the Sheffield Smelting Company- but later experienced financial difficulties and had to sell Wincobank Hall, which Mary, as the widow of a banker, was able to reclaim. Her sister, Elizabeth (1803-1851), was married to William Wilson (1800-1866), chairman of the Nottingham Anti-Slavery committee; their son was the MP Henry Wilson Homfirth MP, his half-sister being the missionary Sarah Poulton Kalley. Henry Wilson and his brother John Wycliffe Wilson were beneficiaries and trustees of Mary's estate, and ensured her plans for Wincobank Hall were carried out.

== Abolitionism and campaigning ==
Her abiding interest from the mid-1820s to the 1850s was a campaign in the Sheffield area against slavery. Rawson was a founding member in 1825 of the Sheffield Female Anti-Slavery Society, which campaigned for the rights of slaves in the British Empire. The Sheffield society was the first to campaign not for a gradual and managed end, but for an immediate end to slavery. The society used lectures and pamphlets to achieve a decrease in sales of slave-produced West Indian goods, such as coffee and sugar. It formally wound up after the passage of the Slavery Abolition Act 1833.

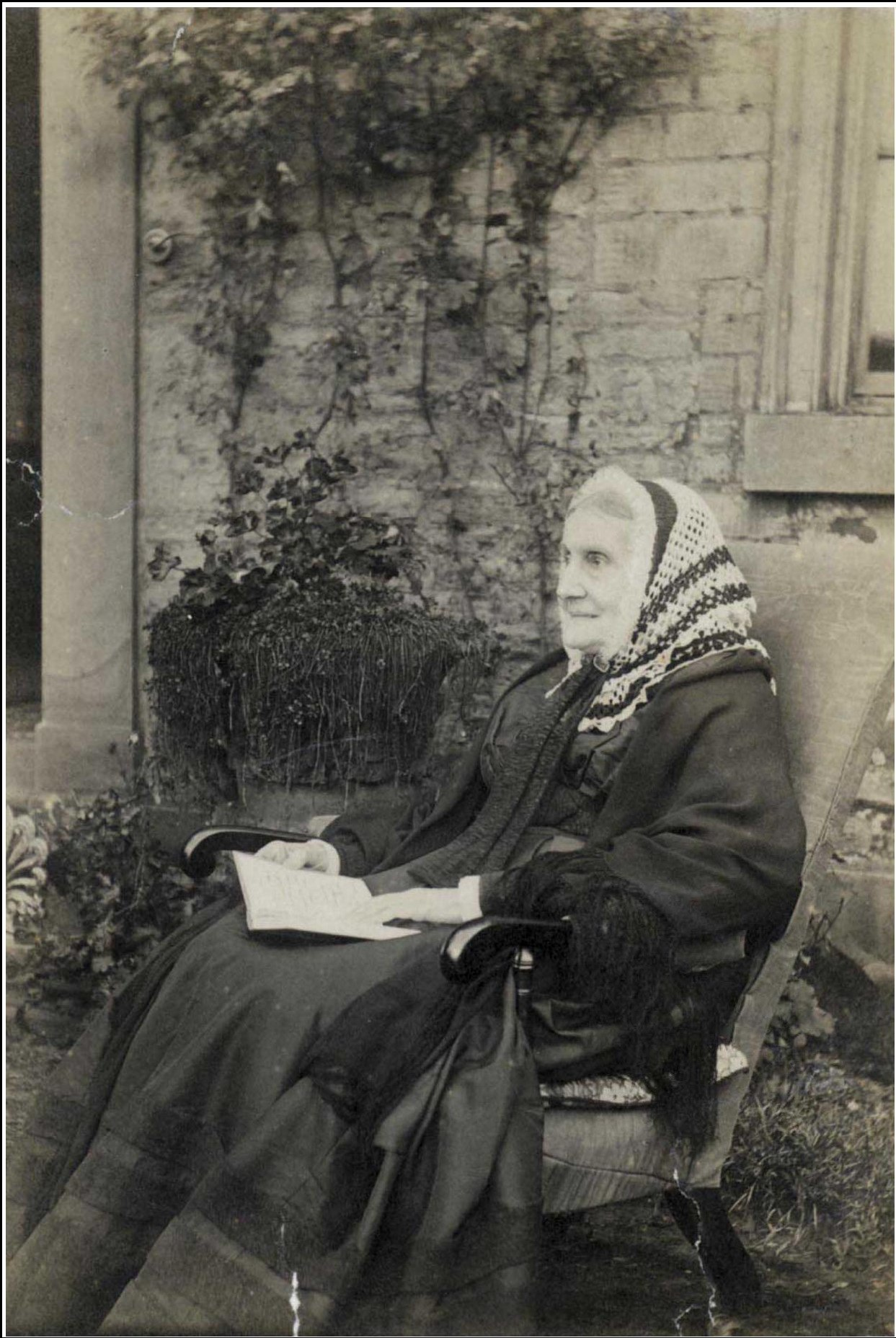
Mrs Rawson

In 1837 Rawson became secretary of the Sheffield Ladies Association for the Universal Abolition of Slavery, which continued the case for enslaved workers across the world. The anti-slavery organisations run by women were first started by Lucy Townsend and they were sometimes dismissed as of marginal interest, but recent research has revealed that these groups had a national impact.

Rawson corresponded with figures such as George Thompson in Britain as well as Frederick Douglass and William Lloyd Garrison in the United States. Her visitors included Lord Shaftesbury and William Wilberforce. With her mother Elizabeth Read as treasurer, Rawson was prominent in the Sheffield Female Anti-Slavery Society. Her father Joseph Read owned a business involved in the smelting of precious metals.

Her father having died subsequent to his financial difficulties and loss of Wincobank Hall, Rawson's early widowhood allowed her to return and pay off her father's debts. She and her mother resumed residence at Wincobank Hall, both leading politically active lives.

Rawson is to the far right in this painting which is of the 1840 Anti-Slavery Convention. Move your cursor to the right hand side to identify her or click icon to enlarge

The painting shows Rawson in a commemorative painting of the world's first international anti-slavery conference, which attracted delegates from America, France, Haiti, Australia, Ireland, Jamaica and Barbados in 1840. With the exception of Mary Clarkson, all of the women in the painting are shown to the far right and none of them is in the foreground of the painting. No females were allowed into the main body of the convention. This caused some difficulties with the American delegation. Women included in the painting included Elizabeth Pease, Amelia Opie, Baroness Byron, Anne Knight, Mrs John Beaumont, Elizabeth Tredgold, Thomas Clarkson's daughter Mary and right at the back Lucretia Mott. After the convention she played host to Charles Lenox Remond as well as Nathaniel Peabody Rogers.

In 1841, Rawson and her sister, Emily Read, arranged for a day school to be created in the chapel on the grounds of Wincobank Hall. The school was open to local children. In 1860 the sisters created a trust to provide for its financial endowment and management. The school continued until 1905.

In 1899, Wincobank Hall was opened as a ‘rescue home’ by the Salvation Army, which ran on the site until 1915. By 1921, Wincobank Hall was said to be in ‘a state of desolation’. The hall was subsequently demolished to make way for the Flower Estate, a housing estate so-called as all the streets are named after flowers and plants.

Today the chapel has been restored for community use.

== Personal life ==
She married William Bacon Rawson, a Nottingham banker and iron founder, but the marriage was short-lived due to William's early death in 1829. Their only child, Elizabeth, died in 1862 aged 33.

== Publications ==
In 1834, Rawson compiled a collection of original writings against slavery and in favour of its abolition in the British colonies. The contributions came from fifty writers.

== Legacy ==
The Indiana University's Lilly library has an extensive collection of Rawson's letters and photographs, including a collection of her watercolours of Italy. The University of Sheffield holds a collection of Rawson's materials related to the poet James Montgomery.
