= Easter Sepulchre =

Feature of British and Late Medieval Irish pre Reformation church architecture

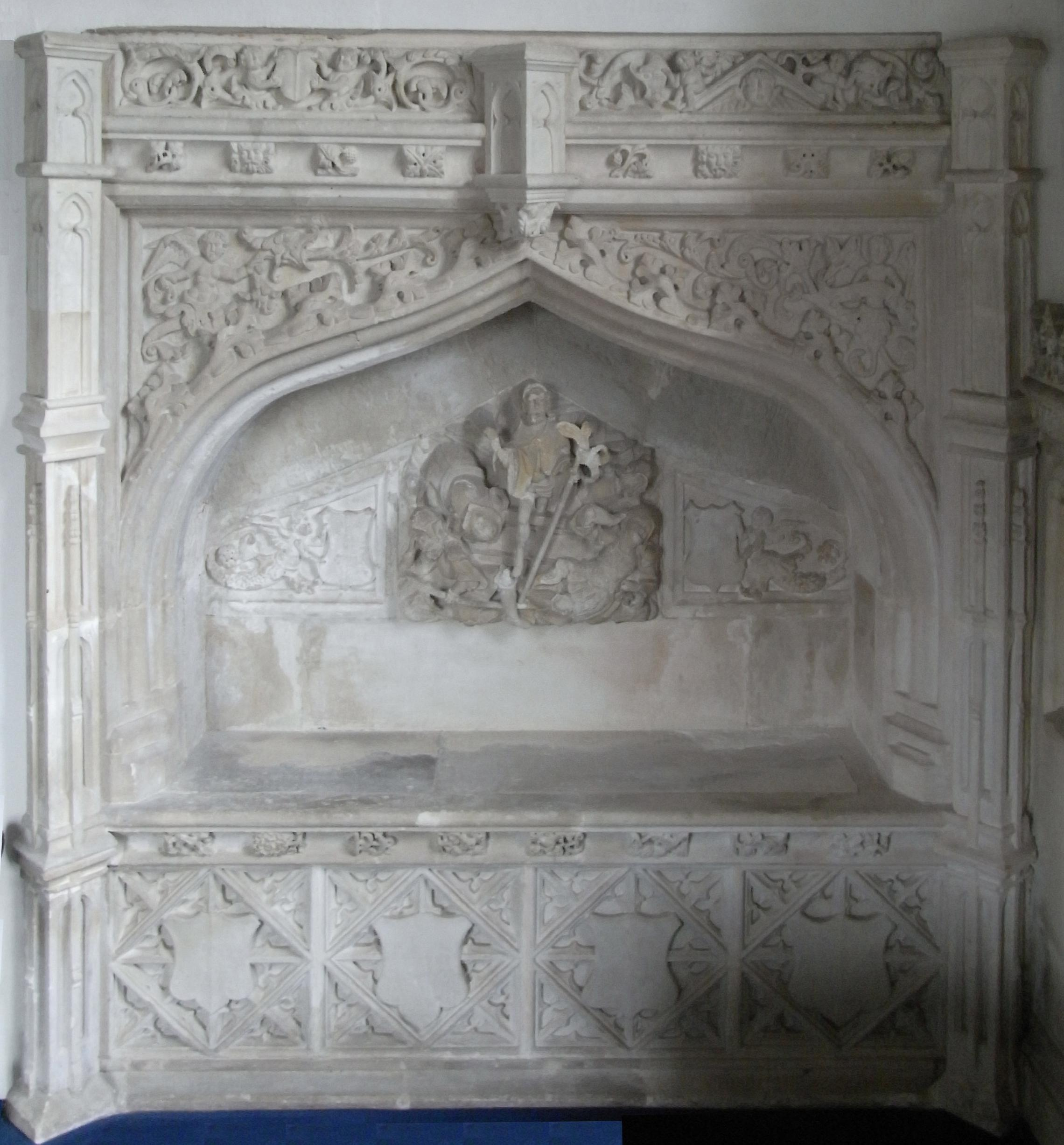
Easter Sepulchre for an unknown member of the Denys family, 16th century, in Holcombe Burnell Church, Devon. Renaissance classical elements are shown such as a classical pediment and Italianate putti, but the whole is contained within a late Gothic arch.

An Easter Sepulchre is a feature of Late Medieval British and Irish church interior architecture.

== Description ==
The Easter Sepulchre is an arched recess generally in the north wall of the chancel, in which from Good Friday to Easter day were deposited the crucifix and sacred elements in commemoration of Christ's entombment and resurrection. It was generally only a wooden structure, which was placed in a recess or on a tomb.

== Distribution ==
The Easter Sepulchre is only found in England Ireland and Wales, the practice having been peculiar to the Sarum Rite. However, there is a ruin presumed to be an Easter sepulchre at Kildrummy in north-east Scotland.

== Use ==
The Easter Sepulchre contained the Blessed Sacrament of the altar, the Host. Following the doctrine of the Real Presence, i.e. that Jesus is physically present within the Host, on Good Friday the Host was taken from the tabernacle where it had been placed following the Maundy Thursday celebration of the Last Supper and, wrapped in linen cloths, 'buried' in the Easter sepulchre which was found on the north wall of the sanctuary. Cut into the wall, it was sometimes ornately carved but within it was a wooden frame on which was hung a cloth pall often embroidered with scenes from the Passion. Candles were lit around the sepulchre, burial clothes adorned it, and parishioners stood guard until early Easter morning at the first Mass. The Host was brought out, in imitation of Jesus having arisen out of the tomb, and was placed again in the tabernacle in the centre of the Church. Like Roods or Crucifixes and their lofts, Easter Sepulchres were the object of iconoclastic fury by the Protestant Reformers, and few still survive.

== Surviving examples ==
There are throughout Great Britain and Ireland many fine examples in stone from the Late Medieval pre Reformation period, some of which are Decorated Gothic, such as:

=== Cumbria ===
- Warwick Bridge

=== Devon ===
- Holcombe Burnell
- Bishops Nympton
- Heanton Punchardon
- Monkleigh
- St Mary's Church, Berry Pomeroy
- Throwleigh

=== Dorset ===
- Gillingham
- Tarrant Hinton

=== Glamorgan ===
- Coity

=== Herefordshire ===
- Ledbury

=== Lincolnshire ===
- Navenby
- Heckington (1370)

=== London ===
- St John the Divine, Kennington

=== Norfolk ===
- Fritton
- Kelling
- St Andrew's Church, Northwold

=== Northamptonshire ===
- Lutton
- St. Mary's Church, Grendon

=== Nottinghamshire ===
- Sibthorpe
- Hawton (1370)
- Arnold

=== Oxfordshire ===
- Bampton
- Piddington

=== Somerset ===
- Church of All Saints, Monksilver

=== Suffolk ===
- Cockfield
- East Harling
- Long Melford
- St Margaret South Elmham

=== Warwickshire ===
- Long Itchington
- Withybrook, Coventry

=== West Sussex ===
- St Catherine of Siena Church, Cocking

=== East Riding of Yorkshire ===
- Patrington

== Gallery ==
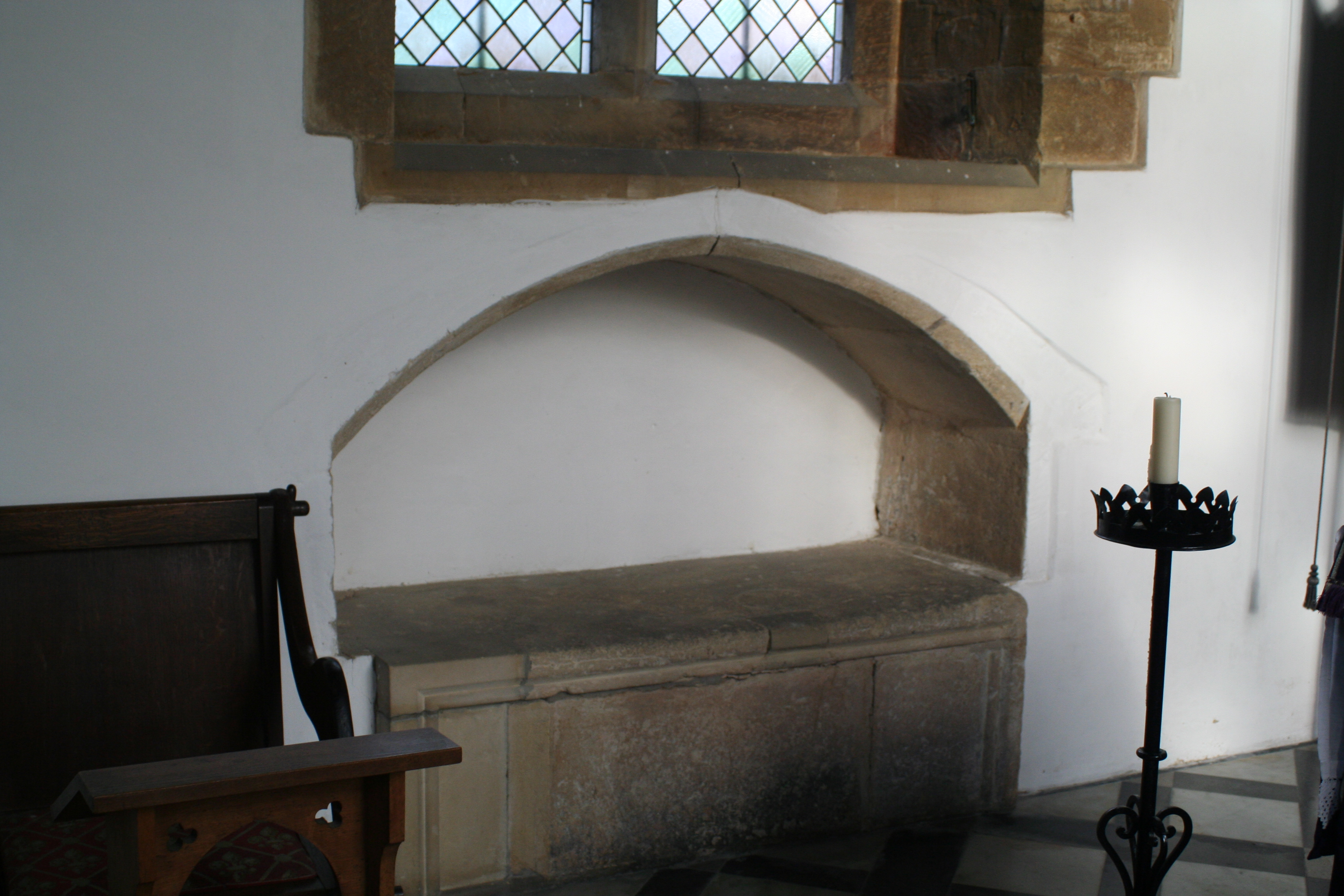
A simple unadorned example from St Mary's Church, Grendon, Northamptonshire

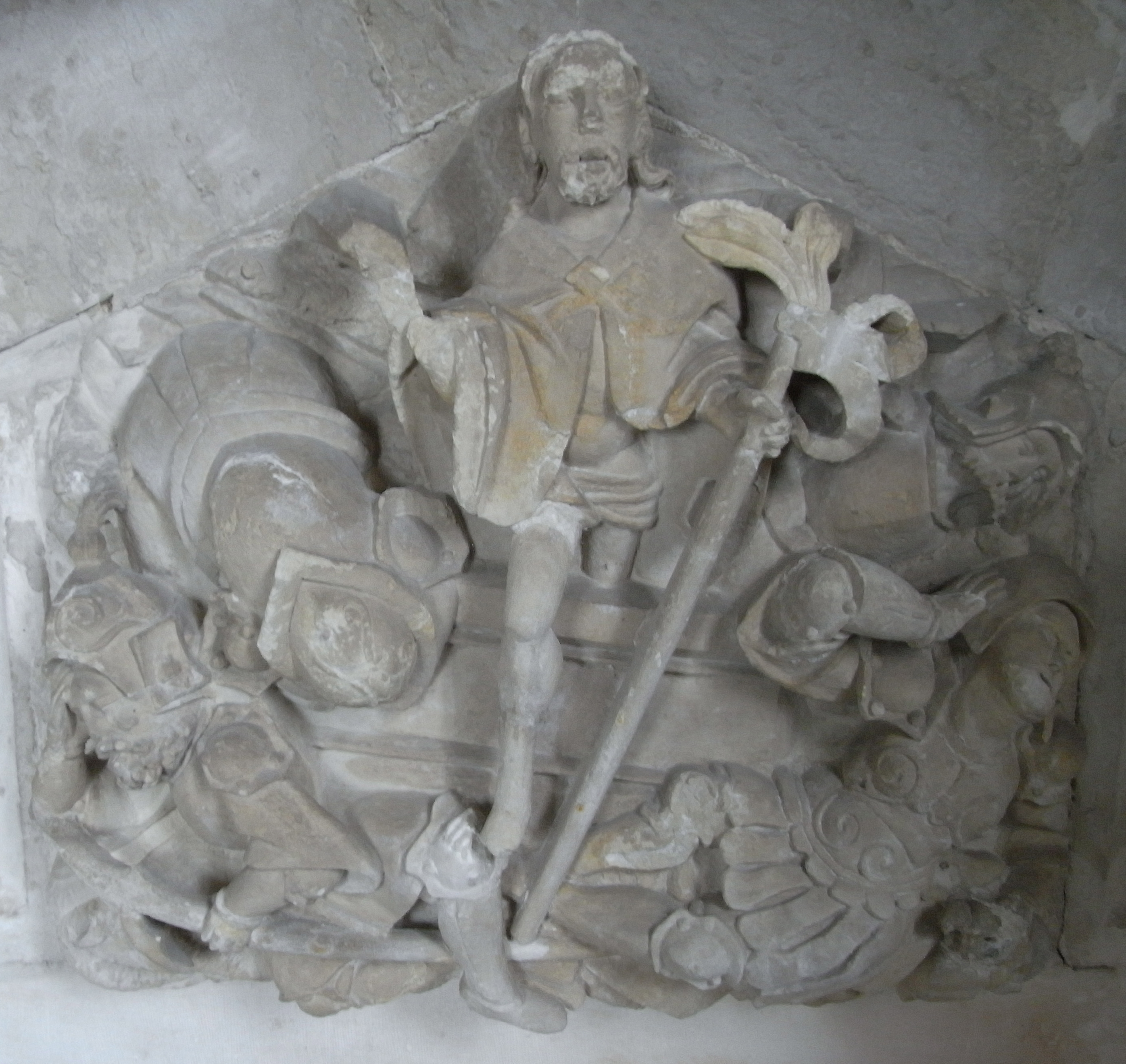
Holcombe Burnell Church, Devon. Detail of central sculpted relief showing Christ stepping out of the tomb, with sleeping guards

== See also ==
- Holy Sepulchre
- Tomb of Jesus
