= Listed buildings in Farndon, Nottinghamshire =

Farndon is a civil parish in the Newark and Sherwood district of Nottinghamshire, England. The parish contains 19 listed buildings that are recorded in the National Heritage List for England. Of these, one is listed at Grade I, the highest of the three grades, and the others are at Grade II, the lowest grade. The parish contains the village of Farndon and the surrounding area. Most of the listed buildings are houses, cottages, farmhouses, and associated structures. The other listed buildings are a church and a former windmill.

== Key ==
Grade	Criteria
I	Buildings of exceptional interest, sometimes considered to be internationally important
II	Buildings of national importance and special interest

== Buildings ==
Name and location	Photograph	Date	Notes	Grade
St Peter's Church; 53.05792°N 0.85567°W		12th century	The church has been altered and extended through the centuries, the tower was restored or rebuilt in 1598.and the church was restored in 1892–93 by C. Hodgson Fowler. The church is built in rendered stone, with quoins and parapets. It consists of a nave with a clerestory, north and south aisles, a south porch, a chancel with a north vestry and a south chapel, and a west tower. The tower has three stages, a chamfered plinth, diagonal buttresses, and an embattled parapet with eight crocketed pinnacles. The north wall contains a 12th-century round-arched doorway with a blocked tympanum.	I
3 and 3A School Lane; 53.05657°N 0.85255°W	A listed building in Farndon, Newark	Late 17th century	A pair of cottages, the right cottage originally a school. They are in red brick with pantile roofs, the right roof steeper. The right cottage has two storeys and attics. The left cottage is on a plinth and has a floor band, two storeys and three bays. The windows in both cottages are casements.	II
1 Church Street; 53.05810°N 0.85441°W		Early 18th century	The house, which was refronted in 1794, is in red brick on a plinth, with stone dressings, floor bands, a modillion cornice and a hipped slate roof. There are two storeys, a basement and attics, and five bays, the middle bay projecting under a pediment, and rear wings. In the centre is a porch with a coped parapet, and a doorway with pilasters, a fluted architrave, a traceried fanlight, a keystone, and a dentilled pediment on moulded brackets. Over the porch is a Venetian window with a keystone and a hood mould, and above that is a Diocletian window. The other windows are sashes with cambered heads and wedge lintels. On the sides of the house are canted bay windows.	II
Cross Lane Farm House; 53.05717°N 0.85533°W		Mid 18th century	The farmhouse is in red brick, with floor bands, a raised eaves band, and a pantile roof with brick coped gables and kneelers. There are two storeys and attics, a front range of three bays, and two-storey rear wings. The central doorway has a fanlight, the windows are sashes, and all the openings have flush brick wedge lintels.	II
Farndon Lodge; 53.05815°N 0.85614°W	—	Mid 18th century	A house in red brick and some stone, on a plinth, with a floor band, dentilled eaves, and a hipped slate roof. There are two storeys, a main range of three bays, and extensions on the left and at the rear. In the centre of the front is a porch with fluted Doric columns, a triglyph frieze with circular metopes, a cornice with decorative mutules, and a doorway with a fanlight. The windows are sashes with decorative flush wedge stone lintels.	II
The Old Hall; 53.05504°N 0.85687°W	—	Mid 18th century	The house is in brick on a plinth, with stone dressings, floor bands, a stone cornice, and a slate roof with stone coped gables. There are two storeys, a basement and attics, five bays, the middle bay projecting slightly under a pediment, a lean-to on the right, and rear wings. In the basement are four openings. Steps lead up to the central doorway that has decorated pilasters, a fanlight over which is a decorative wooden fan, and an open pediment on brackets. The windows are sashes with segmental arches and flush brick wedge lintels.	II
Chestnut Farm House; 53.05844°N 0.85309°W	—	Late 18th century	The farmhouse is in red brick, with floor bands, dentilled eaves, and a pantile roof with brick coped gables. There are two storeys and attics, and an L-shaped plan, with a front range of three bays. The central doorway has a fanlight, the windows are sashes, and all the openings have flush wedge brick lintels.	II
Gazebo, Farndon Lodge; 53.05799°N 0.85613°W	—	Late 18th century	The gazebo in the garden of the house is in red brick, with a raised eaves band and a pyramidal slate roof. There is a single storey and a single bay. In the north wall is a doorway with a decorative shaped lintel, and elsewhere are a fixed light and a casement window.	II
Pedlars Way; 53.05850°N 0.85547°W		Late 18th century	The house is in brick and stone, on a plinth, with floor bands, dentilled eaves, and a pantile roof with brick coped gables and kneelers. There are two storeys and attics, four bays, and a double depth plan, the rear range being later. The doorway has pilasters, a fanlight, and on open pediment on consoles. The windows are sashes under segmental arches.	II
Pilgrim Cottage; 53.05784°N 0.85210°W	—	Late 18th century	A house in red brick with a blue brick band at the base, a floor band, dentilled eaves, and a pantile roof with brick coped gables and kneelers. There are two storeys and three bays, and a rear lean-to. In the centre is a doorway with fluted pilasters, a fanlight and an open pediment. The windows are sashes.	II
The Hollies; 53.05729°N 0.85641°W	—	Late 18th century	The house is in red brick with a moulded cornice and a slate roof. There are two storeys and attics, and a front of five bays, the middle three bays projecting slightly under a pediment. The central doorway has pilasters, a fanlight, and an open pediment on fluted brackets. In the lower two floors the windows are sashes, above are casement windows, and in the outer bays are recessed panels. The windows and panels have segmental arches.	II
The Old Vicarage; 53.05890°N 0.85403°W		Late 18th century	The vicarage, later a private house, is in red brick, on a plinth, with dentilled eaves, and a slate roof with a brick coped gable on the left. There are two storeys and seven bays, two of the bays projecting under a hipped roof. The doorway has pilasters, a fanlight, and an open pediment on consoles. The windows are sashes, most with wedge lintels.	II
Farndon Windmill; 53.06644°N 0.83781°W		1823	The former windmill is a circular tapering brick tower on a plinth, with five stages and a dentilled curb. The openings have segmental heads.	II
16 Main Street; 53.05768°N 0.85159°W		Early 19th century	A house in red brick, with a floor band, dogtooth eaves and a pantile roof. There are two storeys and attics, and three bays. In the centre is a doorway with a fanlight, and the windows are sashes.	II
8 West End; 53.05739°N 0.85669°W	—	Early 19th century	A house in red brick on a rendered plinth, with a moulded cornice and a hipped slate roof. There are two storeys, three bays, the middle bay projecting slightly under a pediment, a recessed single bay extension on the right, and a rear wing. In the centre is a doorway with Doric columns and an open pediment. The windows are sashes with wedge lintels, and at the rear is a canted bay window.	II
Coach House, 8 West End; 53.05745°N 0.85635°W	—	Early 19th century	The coach house is in red brick with an eaves cornice and a hipped pantile roof. There are two storeys and three bays. It contains two arched doorways, a blocked arch with an inserted doorway, sash windows, and an external flight of steps. Recessed on the right is a single-storey two-bay outbuilding, and adjacent to it is a water pump in wood, iron and lead.	II
Greenhouse, The Old Hall; 53.05493°N 0.85697°W	—	Early 19th century	The greenhouse is in brick with a roof of slate and glass, and has a semicircular coped parapet with kneelers and an orb finial. There is a single storey and a single bay. In the centre is a doorway, flanked by sash windows, and over all is a large semicircular traceried fanlight. The greenhouse is connected to the hall by a brick wall.	II
Wall, railings, gate piers and gates, The Old Vicarage; 53.05862°N 0.85382°W		Early 19th century	At the entrance to the grounds are double iron gates flanked by red brick piers with moulded coping and orb finials. On each side are brick walls with moulded coping and iron railings, ending in brick piers with moulded coping.	II
Willows; 53.05717°N 0.85611°W	—	Early 19th century	The house, which was later extended, is in red brick, partly on a plinth, with a floor band, dentilled eaves and a pantile roof. There are two storeys and five bays, and recessed to the right is a single-storey single bay outbuilding incorporated into the house. On the front are two doorways, one with a sloping hood, and a conservatory. The windows are sashes under cambered arches.	II
