= Listed buildings in Cotham, Nottinghamshire =

Coddington is a civil parish in the Newark and Sherwood district of Nottinghamshire, England. The parish contains three listed buildings that are recorded in the National Heritage List for England. Of these, one is at Grade II*, the middle of the three grades, and the others are at Grade II, the lowest grade. The parish contains the village of Cotham and the surrounding area, and the listed buildings consist of a church and associated structures, and a terrace of cottages.

== Key ==
Grade	Criteria
II*	Particularly important buildings of more than special interest
II	Buildings of national importance and special interest

== Buildings ==
Name and location	Photograph	Date	Notes	Grade
St Michael's Church; 53.02002°N 0.81740°W		12th century	The church has been altered and extended through the centuries, and is now redundant. It is in stone with a tile roof, and consists of a nave and chancel under a continuous roof, a south porch and a west turret with a pyramidal roof. The porch was added in 1830, and has a pantile roof and a coped parapet, and on the chancel is a sundial dated 1643.	II*
The Row; 53.01722°N 0.81544°W	—	c. 1800	A terrace of four cottages, the main range dating from about 1800, and the rear wing from the 17th century. The cottages are in brick with pantile roofs. The main range has two storeys, and contains a mix of sash and casement windows under segmental arches. The rear wing has a single storey and attics, and the windows are casements.	II
Wall, gargoyles and gate, St Michael's Church; 53.01992°N 0.81720°W		19th century	The churchyard wall is in stone and coped. It contains re-used 14h-century gargoyles, and a gateway with wrought iron gates.	II
