= St Peter's Church, Farndon =

Church in Farndon, Nottinghamshire, England

Coordinates: 53°03′28″N 00°51′20″W

St. Peter's Church, Farndon
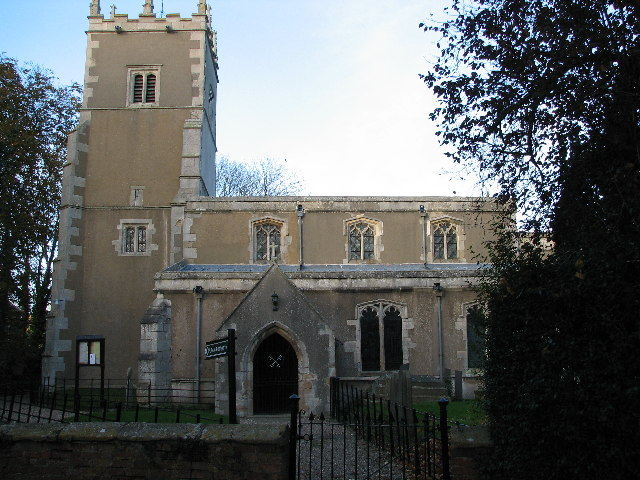
- St. Peter's Church, Farndon
- Denomination: Church of England
- Churchmanship: Broad Church

History
- Dedication: St. Peter

Administration
- Province: York
- Diocese: Southwell and Nottingham
- Parish: Farndon, Nottinghamshire

Clergy
- Rector: Rev Liz Murray

St. Peter's Church, Farndon is a parish church in the Church of England in Farndon, Nottinghamshire.

The church is Grade I listed as a building of outstanding architectural or historic interest.

== History ==
The Church of St. Peter at Farndon "was erected during the reign of Queen Elizabeth, and... consists of chancel, nave with clerestory, a south aisle with an arcade of three bays, a western square tower containing four bells, and with an entrance porch. Portions of Saxon work, perhaps belonging to the first church, are to be found built in the north wall of the nave; the second church is represented by the columns and arches of the south aisle; while the third and present church is chiefly built in the Perpendicular style. The font is an Early English one. The date on the nave roof, which is well constructed, is 1664, and there are two stained glass windows of some merit, one on the south side of the chancel and the other in the aisle. Much interest was taken in an ancient sword, thought to be Saxon, and measuring 2ft 4 1/2 ins (72 cm) long, which was discovered when excavating under the present church in October, 1892. This "Viking sword from Farndon Church" is now preserved in the church vestry." The sword is thought to represent "evidence of Danish and Viking attacks in the Newark area," and the sword is illustrated in David Kaye's "History of Nottinghamshire." In recent years, the four church bells have been augmented to six and re-hung.

St. Peter's church is located at the extreme southwest of the village proper. An 1884 map of Farndon can be seen. An aerial photo of Farndon Harbour can be seen

== Current parish status ==
It is in the United Benefice of Farndon with Thorpe and Hawton with Cotham:

- All Saints' Church, Hawton
- St. Lawrence's Church, Thorpe
- St. Peter's Church, Farndon
- St. Michael's Church, Cotham

== See also ==
- Grade I listed buildings in Nottinghamshire
- Listed buildings in Farndon, Nottinghamshire
