= Brough Maltby =

Anglican Archdeacon of Nottingham

The Venerable Canon Brough Maltby
- Archdeacon of Nottingham
- Church: Church of England
- Diocese: Diocese of Southwell and Nottingham
- In office: 1878–1894
- Predecessor: Henry Mackenzie
- Successor: John Richardson

Orders
- Ordination: In Hereford in May 1850

Personal details
- Born: 29 September 1826
- Died: 30 March 1894 (aged 67)
- Residence: Southwell
- Parents: Charles Langley Maltby; Mary Watson
- Spouse: Isabella Chadwick
- Children: 7
- Education: Southwell Minster School
- Alma mater: St John's College, Cambridge

The Venerable Canon Brough Maltby (29 September 1826 – 30 March 1894) was Archdeacon of Nottingham.

== Family ==
Maltby was born in London in 1826, the oldest child of Charles Langley Maltby (1784–1858) and Mary Watson, but his family moved to Southwell shortly after. There he was educated at Southwell Minster School and served as a chorister in the choir of Southwell Minster. He went on to St John's College, Cambridge and graduated with a BA in 1850 and an MA in 1853.

Maltby married Isabella Chadwick, daughter of John Chadwick of Oakwood, Rochdale, on 24 October 1850. They had seven children:

- Brough Maltby (born 6 May 1852)
- James Chadwick Maltby (born 1854), whose grandson David Maltby was an RAF pilot who flew in Operation Chastise.
- Mary Maltby (born 1855)
- Isabella Maltby (born 1856)
- Charles Langley Maltby (1858–1936)
- Edward Secker Maltby (born 1860)
- Margaret Maltby (born 1863)

== Church and restoration work ==
Maltby was ordained deacon in Hereford on 26 May 1850 and a priest on 15 June 1851. He served as Curate of Westbury, Shropshire in 1850, Curate of the Church of St John of Beverley, Whatton in 1851–1864, and Curate of Sibthorpe in 1855–1864. He then became Vicar of St. Peter's Church, Farndon in Nottinghamshire in 1864 and remained the incumbent there until his death in 1894.

At the time of Maltby's arrival the combined parishes of Farndon and Balderton had just been redivided. He was dismayed by the condition of the church, which the Southwell Diocesan Magazine described as in a "melancholy condition of squalor and decay". The neglected Prebendary house was too small for his family, but a more spacious one was found at the corner of Main Street and Marsh Lane. He soon set about improving the church, largely at his own expense. A contractor's account dated 1866 refers to the addition of a "becoming altar with fittings, an organ and stalls" at a cost of £300. The area beneath the tower was fitted as a temporary vestry. Further restoration and expansion ensued in the early 1890s. The work he did was commemorated in the book Brough Maltby, Archdeacon, Church Restorer by Rev. John Quarrell (2001).

== Other church posts ==
Maltby was Rural Dean of Newark from 1876 to 1894, Prebendary and Canon of Lincoln Cathedral in 1871–1894, Chaplain to the Bishop of Southwell in 1884, and Archdeacon of Nottingham in 1878–1894.

A stained-glass window in Southwell Minster was dedicated to Maltby's memory in 1910.
