= Birmingham Ladies Society for the Relief of Negro Slaves =

1825 British women's anti-slavery organisation

The Birmingham Ladies Society for the Relief of Negro Slaves, also known as the Birmingham and West Bromwich Ladies Society for the Relief of Negro Slaves, was founded in Birmingham, England, on 8 April 1825. It was the first anti-slavery society for women, and sometimes referred to as the Ladies' Anti-Slavery Society. Lucy Townsend and Mary Lloyd were the first joint secretaries, while other founding members included Elizabeth Heyrick, Sophia Sturge and Sarah Wedgwood.

The society was supported by the Society for the Mitigation and Gradual Abolition of Slavery Throughout the British Dominions (Anti-Slavery Society).

Around 1830, it became the Female Society for Birmingham. By 1831 there were over seventy similar anti-slavery organisations.

In 2026, the archive of the organisation, held at the Library of Birmingham, was inscribed onto the UNESCO Memory of the World National Register, marking the collection's international historical, cultural and social importance.
