= Listed buildings in Thorpe, Nottinghamshire =

Thorpe is a civil parish in the Newark and Sherwood district of Nottinghamshire, England. The parish contains three listed buildings that are recorded in the National Heritage List for England. All the listed buildings are designated at Grade II, the lowest of the three grades, which is applied to "buildings of national importance and special interest". The parish contains the village of Thorpe and the surrounding countryside, and the listed buildings consist of a church, a former rectory and a farmhouse.

== Buildings ==
Name and location	Photograph	Date	Notes
St Lawrence's Church; 53.04284°N 0.85757°W		13th century	The tower of the church was restored, and the body of the church was rebuilt, in 1869–70 by Charles Baily. The church is built in stone with slate roofs, and consists of a nave and a chancel under one roof, a south porch, and a west tower. The tower has two stages, diagonal buttresses, a band, a parapet and a pyramidal roof.
Wharf Farm House; 53.04388°N 0.87189°W		Early 19th century	The farmhouse is in red brick with dentilled eaves and a pantile roof. There are two storeys and a main range of three bays, to the right is a single-storey wing with a hipped roof, and at the rear is a two-storey two-bay wing with a single-storey extension. In the centre of the main range is a gabled trellis porch with a slate roof, and the windows are sashes.
The Old Rectory; 53.04255°N 0.85778°W		1830	The former rectory is in red brick, and has a hipped slate roof with overhanging eaves. There are two storeys and three bays. The central doorway has a reeded surround, a fanlight, paterae and a hood, and the windows on the front are sashes. Recessed on the right is a lower extension with two storeys and a single bay with a pantile roof. On the west front is a two-storey polygonal bay window.
