= Susanna Watts =

English abolitionist (1768–1842)

Susanna Watts (1768–1842) was an English abolitionist, writer and translator. She co-founded The Humming Bird anti-slavery periodical, campaigned against the purchase of Caribbean sugar or other products produced by slave labour and collected local signatures for the London Female Anti-Slavery Society’s national petition. She also wrote the first guide book of Leicester and founded the philanthropical organisation, the Society of the Relief of Indigent Old Age.

== Family ==
Watts was born in 1768, in Danet's Hall, Leicester and was baptised on 5 July 1768. She was the youngest of three sisters and the only child of John and Joan Watts (née Clarke) to survive childhood, as her two siblings died young from tuberculosis. Her formerly genteel family was left impoverished after her uncle (who had supported the family after Watts' father died when she was 15 months old), died when she was 15.

== Career ==
Watts was a gifted linguist and learned French and Italian in order to teach and translate. She also took up writing in order to earn money to support herself and her mother. Her poetry was noted for its anti-slavery themes and she published a poem directed at politician and abolitionist William Wilberforce, criticising his views on women working in the abolitionist movement. He felt that campaigning against slavery was "unsuited to the female character as delineated in scripture."

Watts and her friend Elizabeth Heyrick campaigned against slavery, including founding female-authored The Humming Bird, the first anti-slavery periodical. The editors were listed as the three sisters: "Truth, Common Sense, and Philanthropy".

Watts visited greengrocers and other businesses to encourage the owners not to purchase Caribbean sugar and other products produced by slave labour, as "abstinence from sugar would sign the death warrant of West Indian slavery." By June 1825, about a quarter of Leicester's population had given up sugar.

In 1833, when the London Female Anti-Slavery Society’s organised a national anti-slavery petition, Watts collected local signatures in Leicestershire. When slaves were emancipated a year later in 1834, Watts was fêted for her abolitionist campaigning.

Watts published a number of translations, collections of poetry, and travel writing. Upon Heyrick's death in 1834, Watts published a poem To the Memory of Eliizabeth Heyrick. Watts' reputation led to her being noted in Mary Pilkington's Memoirs of Celebrated Female Characters.

She published her guidebook A Walk Through Leicester anonymously, and referred to herself as 'he' in the address at the beginning of the book. The work is now recognised as the first published guide book about the town.

Watts also founded the philanthropical organisation, Society of the Relief of Indigent Old Age, as well as publishing books on the treatment of animals. Her poem The Insects in Council: Addressed to Entomologists, with Other Poems argued that even insects deserved freedom through the narrations of a dragon-fly, a bee and a moth.

== Death ==
Watts died on 11 February 1842 in Leicester and was buried at St Mary de Castro Church on 15 February 1842.

Her scrapbook of her work and interests is now held by the Leicestershire Records Office.

== Selected published works ==
- Chinese maxims, translated from The oeconomy of human life, into heroic verse - (Translation) (1784).
- The Wonderful Travels of Prince Fan-Feredin, in the Country of Arcadia – (Translation) (1799).
- Original Poems and Translations (1802).
- A Walk Through Leicester (1804).
- The Insects in Council, Addressed to Entomologists, with Other Poems (1828).
- The Animals’ Friend: a Collection of Observations and Facts Tending to Restrain Cruelty, and to Inculcate Kindness towards Animals (1831)
