= Cotham, Nottinghamshire =

Hamlet in Nottinghamshire, England

Coordinates: 53.017°N 0.817°W

Cotham
- Hamlet and civil parish
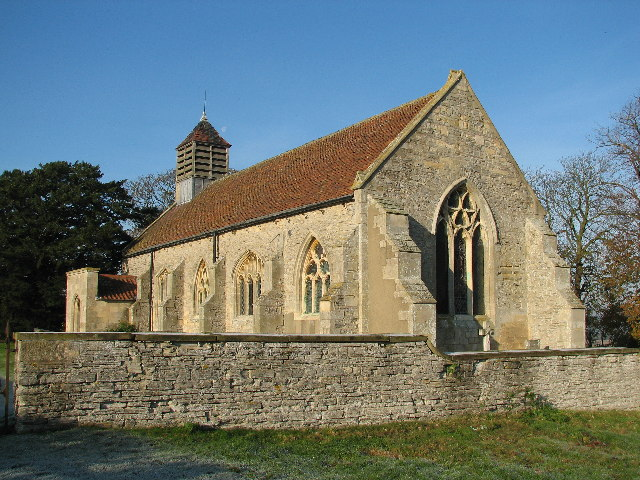
- Saint Michael's Church, Cotham

- Location within Nottinghamshire
- Interactive map of Cotham
- Area: 2.11 sq mi (5.5 km^{2})
- Population: 88 (2021)
  - Density: 42/sq mi (16/km^{2})
- OS grid reference: SK 749472
  - London: 105 mi (169 km) SSE
- District: Newark and Sherwood
- Shire county: Nottinghamshire
- Region: East Midlands
- Country: England
- Sovereign state: United Kingdom
- Post town: NEWARK
- Postcode district: NG23
- Dialling code: 01636
- Police: Nottinghamshire
- Fire: Nottinghamshire
- Ambulance: East Midlands
- UK Parliament: Newark

Cotham, Nottinghamshire is a hamlet and civil parish near Newark-on-Trent in the East Midlands of England.

== Population ==
The village population is reported as 88 residents at the 2021 census.

== Heritage ==
Francis White's Directory of Nottinghamshire described Cotham in 1853:

Cotham is a small village on the east bank of the River Devon, 4 miles (6.4 km) south of Newark. It contains 98 inhabitants, and 1,210 acres (4.9 km^{2}) of land valued at £1,700, all belonging to the Duke of Portland, who is the impropriator and patron of St. Michael's Church, Cotham. The church was partly rebuilt, a porch being added, and new pews in 1832. The living is a donative valued at £35, and is now enjoyed by the Rev. John Ince Maltby of Shelton. This place was long the seat of the knightly families of Leek and Markham, but it is now divided into three farms, occupied by John Booth, William Hodgkinson and Thomas Rose, the latter of whom resides at Cotham Lodge, a pleasant residence, commanding fine prospects.

The village had a railway station on the Great Northern Railway line between Newark North Gate and Nottingham Victoria via Bingham from 1879 to 1939. The line itself closed in 1955.

== Anglican church ==
St Michael's Church, Cotham, stands back from the village. It dates from the 12th century and is a Grade II* listed building, but it is now redundant.

== See also ==
- Listed buildings in Cotham, Nottinghamshire
