= John Harfield Tredgold =

British pharmacist (1798–1842)

J. Harfield Tredgold
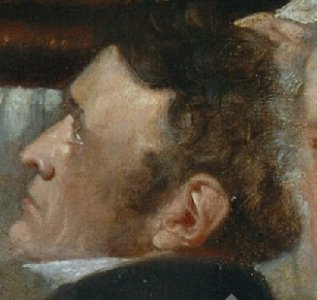
- Tredgold in 1840
- Born: 1798; England
- Died: 22 May 1842; Richmond, Surrey, England
- Occupation: Chemist
- Employer: Self-employed
- Spouse: Elizabeth Merrington
- Children: Yes >7
- Parent(s): Thomas and Elizabeth

John Harfield Tredgold (1798 – 22 May 1842) was an English chemist in the Cape Colony in Africa. He held a number of voluntary roles including Secretary of the British and Foreign Anti-Slavery Society. The suburb of Cape Town called Harfield drew its name from Tredgold's middle name.

== Biography ==
Tredgold was baptised in 1798 by his parents Thomas and Elizabeth Tredgold. His middle name was his mother's surname before she married 10 April 1795.

He arrived in the Cape in 1818 (possibly 24 June 1818) and was licensed on 3 July 1818 as a chemist and druggist in the colony. He became a partner in the pharmacy Thredgold and Pocock.

Tredgold married Elizabeth Merrington in Cape Town on New Year's Day 1825 in St Georges Cathedral before it was rebuilt. Elizabeth was born in London in December 1806.

Tredgold was a member of the Cape of Good Hope Philanthropic Society and worked with those in poverty. He was one of the founders of the Commercial Exchange and helped to manage the Cape of Good Hope Savings Bank. He was a member of the influential Congregational Union Chapel in Cape Town who laboured for the emancipation of the slaves at the Cape.

He is thought to have employed John Pocock, whose diaries give an insight into the Tredgolds' family life. Of particular note is a reference to an evening party in 1836 when letters were read from Richard Miles, "a Bechuana boy formerly in the employ of Mr T. but now an itinerant preacher to the native tribes beyond the border". Richard Miles was to go on to have an interesting career as a preacher and interpreter long after Tredgold had left the country. In 1850, Richard Miles was appointed Kaptyn of Bethanie, by the British Resident, Major Warden, in the name of His Excellency the Governor of the Cape.

Tredgold and his family left the Cape on 19 February 1837 due to illness in the family (including his own). This may have been unplanned, as in the same year he was appointed to be a member of a committee authorised by the Governor of the Cape of Good Hope, Lt-General Sir Benjamin d'Urban. Those worthies chosen were to be members of the "Children's Friend Society" who were to liaise with an organisation of the same name in London to safeguard "poor and destitute" children who were moved so that they might learn a trade.

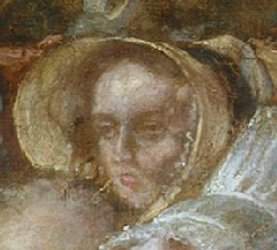
Elizabeth Tredgold in 1840.

Tredgold and his wife Elizabeth attended the World's Anti-Slavery Convention on 12 June 1840. The picture above shows them in a painting made to commemorate the event, which attracted delegates from America, France, Haiti, Australia, Ireland, Jamaica and Barbados. Tredgold is shown at the centre of the painting in his role as secretary whilst Thomas Clarkson speaks. His wife is shown with most of the women to the right of the painting. It had been a matter of much debate as to where the female delegates would sit. Eventually the organisers had insisted that they sit with all the other women and male observers. A few women were included in the painting of the convention with Elizabeth Tredgold; these were Elizabeth Pease, Amelia Opie, Baroness Byron, Mary Anne Rawson, Mrs John Beaumont, Thomas Clarkson's daughter Mary and right at the back Lucretia Mott.

After 1842 Elizabeth Tredgold returned to South Africa with five of her children. Two of her boys had died, aged thirteen and eleven, whilst they were in England. Mrs Tredgold died on 16 March 1892 at her daughter Elizabeth McIntyre's house in Ceres, Western Cape.

== Works ==
- Emigration to Jamaica: Why Should not Englishmen, Irishmen, and Scotchmen go to Jamaica. (London: British and Foreign Anti-Slavery Committee) 1841
