= Saint-Sépulcre, Paris =

Former church in Paris, France

Church of the Holy Sepulchre
- Église du Saint-Sépulcre de Paris
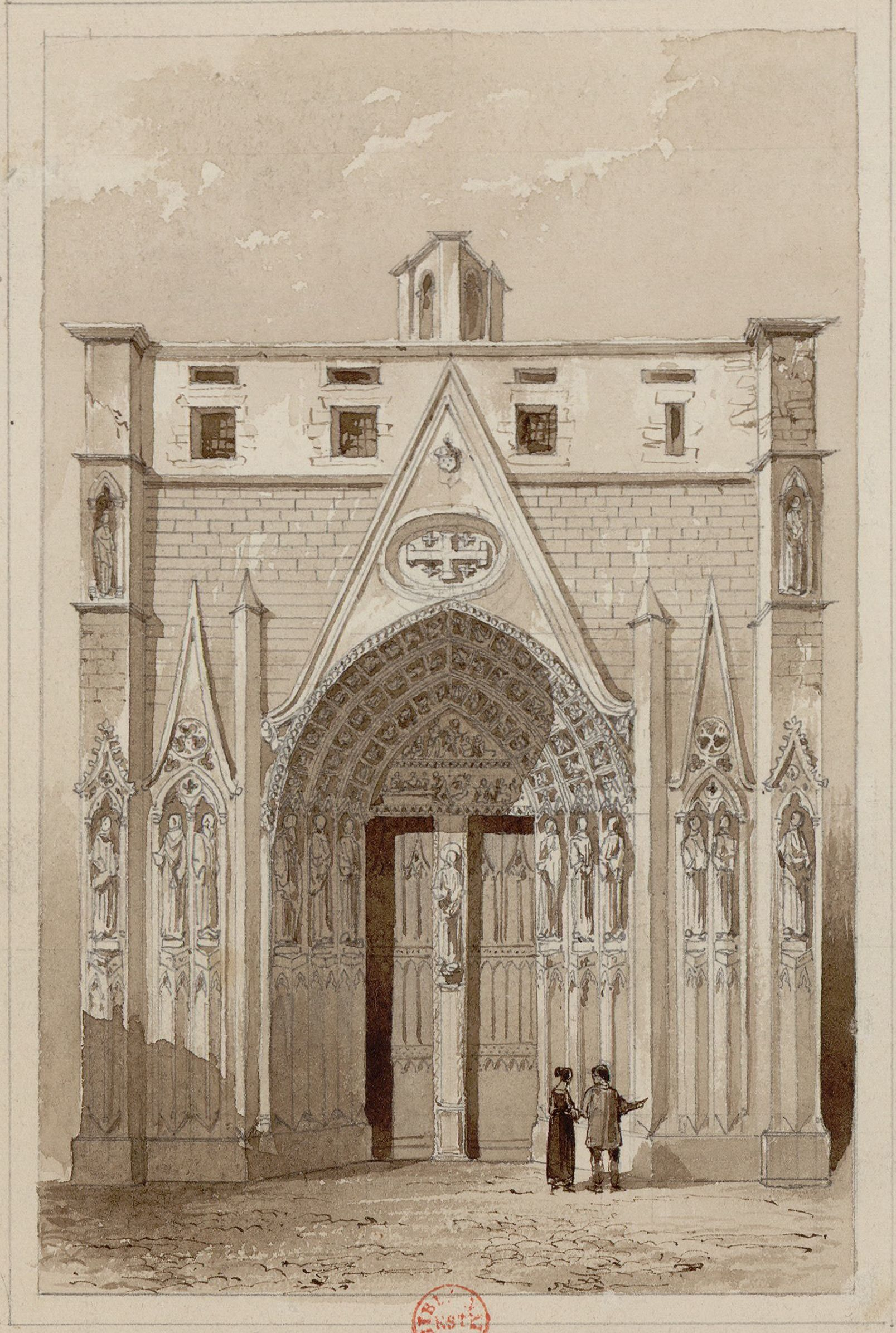
- Church of the Holy Sepulchre, Paris, 18th century

- Location within Paris

Religion
- Affiliation: Roman Catholic

Location
- Municipality: Paris
- Country: France
- Interactive map of Church of the Holy Sepulchre
- Coordinates: 48.864461°N 2.350194°E

Architecture
- Completed: 1326
- Demolished: 19th century

The Chapter of the Holy Sepulchre (French: chapitre du Saint-Sépulcre), also named the Church of the Holy Sepulchre (église du Saint-Sépulcre), was a church in Paris, France.

== Location ==
The church was located at 60 Rue Saint-Denis. Just before the Revolution, the building was in an exclave of the Saint-Merri parish.

== History ==
The church and the hospital belonged to the Canons Regular of the Holy Sepulchre. They were built in 1326 to host the pilgrims who went through Paris on their way to or back from the Church of the Holy Sepulchre in Jerusalem.

The Canons Regular of the Holy Sepulchre were suppressed in 1790.

In 1791, a company of Dutch or Batavian merchants acquired the buildings. They had the buildings demolished and built a large trade house, the cour batave ("Batavian courtyard"), on the site. The house was designed by architects Jean-Nicolas Sobre and Célestin-Joseph Happe. It was destroyed to enable the opening of Boulevard de Sébastopol and the expansion of Rue de la Cossonnerie.
