= Elizabeth Heyrick =

English abolitionist (1769–1831)

- Title page of Immediate, Not Gradual Abolition (1824)
- Born: Elizabeth Coltman; 4 December 1769; Leicester, England
- Died: 18 October 1831 (aged 61); Leicester, England
- Occupations: slavery abolitionist; animal advocate; pacifist; philanthropist; social reformer
- Known for: Advocacy of immediate abolition of slavery; Campaigning against cruelty to animals
- Notable work: Immediate, Not Gradual Abolition (1824)
- Spouse: John Heyrick (m. 1789; died 1797)
- Relatives: Robert Herrick (ancestor by marriage)

Elizabeth Heyrick (née Coltman; 4 December 1769 – 18 October 1831) was an English slavery abolitionist, campaigner against cruelty to animals, pacifist, philanthropist and social reformer. A Quaker, she wrote more than twenty books and pamphlets on slavery, animal protection, war, prisons, corporal punishment, wages, poverty, electoral reform and vagrancy, and opposed practices including bull-baiting. Her 1824 pamphlet Immediate, Not Gradual Abolition argued for the immediate emancipation of enslaved people at a time when leading British abolitionists continued to advocate gradual abolition.

== Early life ==
Heyrick was born Elizabeth Coltman in St Nicholas Street, Leicester, on 4 December 1769, the elder daughter and second of five children of John Coltman, a worsted manufacturer, and Elizabeth Cartwright. Her parents were Dissenters. Her mother was a craftswoman, published poet and book reviewer, and was acquainted with Robert Dodsley and William Shenstone. John Wesley visited the Coltman household, which was attacked by a machine-breaking crowd during riots in 1785.

Known as Bess when young, Heyrick showed an early interest in charitable work. She also painted landscapes, and her father considered encouraging her to pursue art professionally.

On 10 March 1789, aged 19, she married John Heyrick, the eldest son of John Heyrick, Leicester town clerk, and a descendant of the poet Robert Herrick. Her husband left the legal profession to become a cornet in the 15th Light Dragoons, and the couple subsequently lived in military barracks in England and Ireland. He died of angina on 18 June 1797 while Heyrick was attending church. They had no children. Although their marriage was later described as stormy, she mourned him for the rest of her life and observed the anniversary of his death.

After returning to her family, Heyrick left Methodism and joined the Religious Society of Friends. She then became involved in a range of reform causes.

== Reform work and writings ==
Heyrick published anonymously in Leicester and London. Her first known work, The Warning (1805), opposed war. In 1811 she published Familiar Letters Addressed to Children and Young Persons of the Middle Ranks, written originally for the children of one of her sisters-in-law. Her other writings addressed prisons, corporal punishment, wages, poverty, electoral reform and vagrancy legislation.

She also undertook practical charitable work. She visited prisons and paid the gaol fees of poachers who had remained imprisoned because they were unable to meet the charges required for their release. Late in her life she campaigned against capital punishment in association with William Allen.

== Campaigning against cruelty to animals ==
Heyrick campaigned against cruelty to animals from at least 1809. That year she travelled with her sister Mary Ann Coltman to Bonsall, Derbyshire, where an annual bull-baiting was held. Heyrick walked several miles early in the morning in an attempt to prevent the event and, when unsuccessful, secretly purchased the bull. She and her sister returned the following year to distribute anti-bull-baiting tracts door to door; the local curate also denounced the practice, and bull-baiting subsequently ceased in the village.

Following her first visit to Bonsall, Heyrick published two pamphlets against bull-baiting, A Christmas Box for the Advocates of Bull-Baiting and Bull-Baiting: A Village Dialogue Between Tom Brown and John Simms. The latter presents a dialogue between two working men in which John Simms argues for legal protection of animals and condemns cruelty as contrary to Christianity, reason and nature. Heyrick also criticised the class distinctions surrounding blood sports, contrasting condemnation of working-class bull-baiting with the acceptance of activities such as hunting and horse racing among wealthier people.

Her animal advocacy extended beyond blood sports. In Cursory Remarks on the Evil Tendency of Unrestrained Cruelty; Particularly on That Practised in Smithfield Market (1823), she criticised the recently enacted Cruel Treatment of Cattle Act 1822 as inadequate and described the treatment of cattle, sheep and horses at Smithfield Market. She objected to practices including beating and overworking horses, the use of goads on cattle, injuries inflicted on sheep, and other forms of commercial exploitation of animals. Heyrick argued that cruelty was not confined to a particular social class and connected the mistreatment of animals with wider forms of violence and oppression.

Heyrick called for legislation, inspection, education and collective action to prevent cruelty. Ferguson interprets her writings on bull-baiting, animal exploitation and other forms of violence as part of a broader pacifist outlook, noting that Heyrick opposed boxing and pigeon shooting as well as cruelty to animals and regarded these practices as belonging to a wider continuum of violence. Her friend Susanna Watts, in an 1831 elegy, remembered Heyrick as a defender both of enslaved people and of animals subjected to human cruelty.

== Abolitionism ==
Heyrick became involved in the British campaign against slavery during the 1820s. With her friend Susanna Watts, she canvassed large areas of Leicester in 1824 in support of a boycott of sugar produced by enslaved labour in the British West Indies. By June 1825 almost a quarter of Leicester's population had stopped using West Indian sugar.

In 1824 she published Immediate, Not Gradual Abolition; or, An Inquiry into the Shortest, Safest, and Most Effectual Means of Getting Rid of West Indian Slavery. The pamphlet rejected the gradualist strategy then favoured by figures including William Wilberforce and argued instead for immediate emancipation. It was circulated in Britain and the United States in large numbers. Heyrick directed her appeals towards the public rather than government and argued that consumers could exert pressure through the refusal to purchase slave-produced goods.

Heyrick also addressed women directly in her abolitionist writing. In An Appeal to the Hearts and Consciences of British Women (1828), she argued that women should take part in the campaign against slavery and use their influence as consumers. Her writings were later praised by the American abolitionist William Lloyd Garrison, who referred to Heyrick and her advocacy of immediate abolition during a public speech in Glasgow in the mid-1830s.

== Death and papers ==
Heyrick died in Leicester on 18 October 1831 and was buried there. She left a collection of unpublished manuscripts consisting largely of essays, sermons and prayers. A manuscript list attributed eighteen published titles to her, thirteen of which had not been traced when Isobel Grundy wrote her Oxford Dictionary of National Biography entry; three other known works were absent from the list. A Brief Sketch of the Life and Labours of Mrs Elizabeth Heyrick, published in 1862, was probably written by her younger relative Alicia Cooper.

== Legacy and commemoration ==
In August 2024, a sculpture commemorating Heyrick, Abolition (Remembering Elizabeth Heyrick), by Leicestershire artist Corinne Lambert was presented to Leicester Museum & Art Gallery. Heyrick had been selected through a public vote organised by the genealogy company Findmypast from a shortlist of five women to be commemorated. The wire sculpture depicts a female figure with broken chains representing slavery and was added to the museum's permanent collection. Lambert said that the work was intended to represent Heyrick's character rather than provide an exact likeness, as few contemporary images of her survive.

The Elizabeth Heyrick Society is a registered charity established to promote public knowledge of Heyrick and to campaign for a permanent public memorial to her in Leicester. Its activities include educational work, lectures and the development of a proposed statue. The society has continued to raise funds and work towards a larger public memorial in the city.

== Selected works ==
- The Warning (1805)
- A Christmas Box for the Advocates of Bull-Baiting (1809)
- Bull-Baiting: A Village Dialogue Between Tom Brown and John Simms (1809)
- Familiar Letters Addressed to Children and Young Persons of the Middle Ranks (1811)
- Exposition of One Principal Cause of the National Distress, Particularly in Manufacturing Districts; With Some Suggestions for Its Removal (1817)
- Enquiry Into the Consequences of the Present Depreciated Value of Human Labour, In Letters to Thomas Fowell Buxton Esq., Author of An Enquiry Into Our Present System of Prison Discipline (1819)
- Cursory Remarks on the Evil Tendency of Unrestrained Cruelty; Particularly on That Practised in Smithfield Market (1823)
- Protest Against the Spirit and Practice of Modern Legislation, as Exhibited in the New Vagrant Act (1824)
- Immediate, Not Gradual Abolition; or, An Inquiry into the Shortest, Safest, and Most Effectual Means of Getting Rid of West Indian Slavery (1824)
- The Humming Bird; or, Morsels of Information, on the Subject of Slavery (1824–1825)
- Observations on the Offensive and Injurious Effect of Corporal Punishment; on the Unequal Administration of Penal Justice; and on the Pre-Eminent Advantages of the Mild and Reformatory over the Vindictive System of Punishment (1827)
- Apology for Ladies Anti-Slavery Associations (1828)
- An Appeal to the Hearts and Consciences of British Women (1828)

== See also ==
- Abolitionism in the United Kingdom
- Animal welfare in the United Kingdom
- Birmingham Ladies Society for the Relief of Negro Slaves
- History of animal rights
- Quakers in the abolition movement
- Slave Trade Act 1807
- Slavery Abolition Act 1833
