= Thorpe, Nottinghamshire =

Hamlet and civil parish in Nottinghamshire, England

Coordinates: 53.04°N 0.87°W

Thorpe by Newark
- Hamlet and civil parish
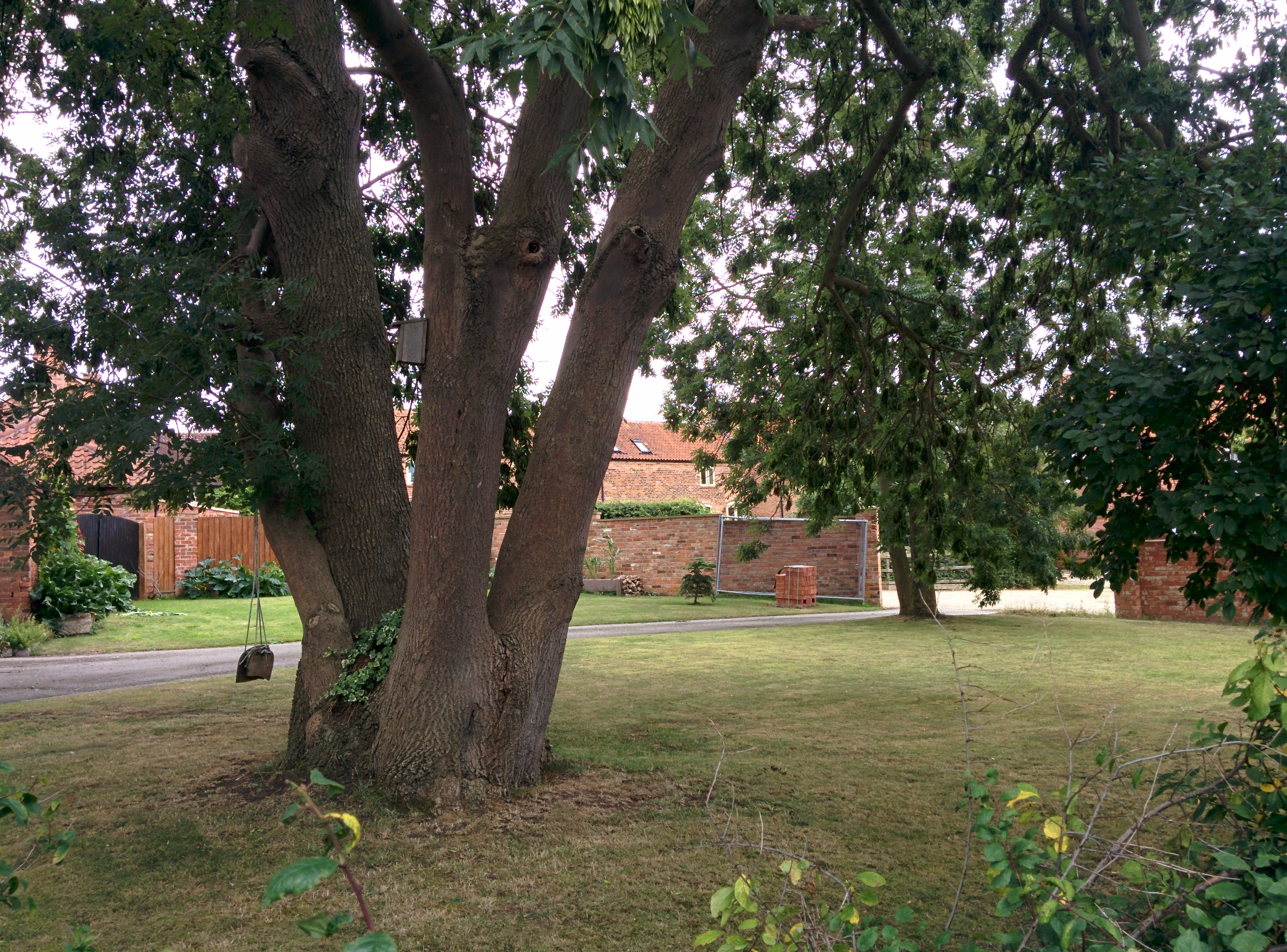
- Thorpe village houses

- Location within Nottinghamshire
- Interactive map of Thorpe by Newark
- Area: 1.13 sq mi (2.9 km^{2})
- Population: 69 (2021)
  - Density: 61/sq mi (24/km^{2})
- OS grid reference: SK 757500
  - London: 140 mi (230 km) SE
- District: Newark and Sherwood
- Shire county: Nottinghamshire
- Region: East Midlands
- Country: England
- Sovereign state: United Kingdom
- Post town: NEWARK
- Postcode district: NG23
- Dialling code: 01636
- Police: Nottinghamshire
- Fire: Nottinghamshire
- Ambulance: East Midlands
- UK Parliament: Newark
- Website: eaststokewiththorpe-pc.gov.uk

Thorpe is a hamlet in the Newark and Sherwood district of Nottinghamshire, England. It lies to the east of East Stoke and 1 mile from the A46 Fosse Way. It is situated in the countryside southwest of Newark. The population was 69 at the 2021 census.

As of 2025, the civil parish is served by East Stoke with Thorpe Parish Council.

== History ==
"Thorpe-by-Newark is a village and parish, 3 miles (5 km) south-west of Newark, with a population of 108 inhabitants and 697 acres (2.8 km^{2}) of land of the rateable value of £1,419. About 180 acres (0.7 km^{2}) of common land was enclosed 40 years ago, and exonerated from tithes, but all the rest still remains titheable. Sir Robert Howe Bromley, Bart., is principal owner, and lord of the manor...W.R. Brockton Esq. is a small owner, and Mr John Tomlin is a resident owner, with a few other small owners." The Roman fort known as AD PONTEM is located east of the FOSSE WAY Roman road north east of the village.

The parish comprises just over 698 acres (2.8 km^{2}). "The church exhibits portions in the several styles of English architecture; the tower was formerly surmounted with a steeple. A fine tessellated pavement, some coins, and other Roman relics, have been discovered. On a small mound in a field adjoining the turnpike-road Henry VII is said to have erected his standard, on 6 June 1487, the day upon which he fought the battle of Stoke Field with the Earl of Lincoln."

Judge Molyneux "settled at Thorpe, two miles (3.2 km) away, where he would have a dwelling suitable to his position, and was succeeded there by his son, grandson, and great-grandson, the latter of whom, Sir John Molyneux, sold the manor to John Halsey and others." Sir John Molyneux, (1623–1691), was once a Sheriff of Nottingham.

=== Population ===
The population of Thorpe in 1801 was 44, in 1851 115, and in 1901 66.

== Religious sites ==
The abolitionist Lucy Townsend lived here at the rectory from 1836.

== See also ==
- Listed buildings in Thorpe, Nottinghamshire
