= St Michael's Church, Cotham =

Coordinates: 53.0200°N 0.8175°W

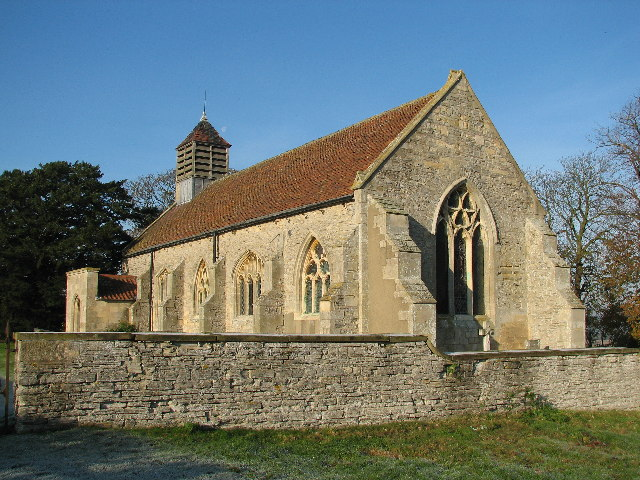
- St Michael's Church, Cotham, from the south-east

- Location in Nottinghamshire
- OS grid reference: SK 794 476
- Location: Cotham, Nottinghamshire
- Country: England
- Denomination: Anglican
- Website: Churches Conservation Trust

History
- Dedication: Saint Michael

Architecture
- Functional status: Redundant
- Heritage designation: Grade II*
- Designated: 16 January 1967
- Architectural type: Church
- Style: Gothic
- Groundbreaking: 12th century
- Completed: 1890

Specifications
- Materials: Stone, tile roofs

St Michael's Church is a redundant Anglican church in the village of Cotham, Nottinghamshire, England. The building dates back to the 12th century.

== Status and position ==
The church is recorded in the National Heritage List for England as a designated Grade II* listed building, and is under the care of the Churches Conservation Trust.

The church stands in a now isolated position in a field, set well back from the road.

== History ==
St Michael's Church originated in the 12th century, with additions and alterations in the 14th and 15th centuries. The tower and the west part of the nave were demolished in the later part of the 18th century. The church was partly rebuilt in about 1832 and the bellcote added in 1890. Though the church was declared redundant on 23 August 2004 and vested in the Churches Conservation Trust on 19 December 1989, it continues to be used occasionally for worship.

== Architecture ==
=== Exterior ===
The church is constructed in coursed stone rubble with ashlar dressings, and it has a tiled roof. Its plan consists of a nave and a chancel under a single roof, a south porch, and a bellcote at the east end. The bellcote has a pyramidal roof. Along the sides of the church are buttresses. At the west end is a two-light window. The north wall contains a door and two three-light windows, and in the south wall there are four three-light windows. The east window also has three lights. Some of the windows contain Decorated tracery, and in others the tracery is Perpendicular. Above the entrance to the porch is a coped parapet, and a stone inscribed with 1830.

=== Interior ===
Inside the church, to the east of the door is a 14th-century piscina. In the west wall are five corbels. The upper two are plain and suggest the position of a former gallery. The lower three have medieval carvings of faces. The font is octagonal and dates from the 14th century. Also dating from the 14th century are two memorials in the south wall that are partly hidden by the wall and the raised floor.

== External feature ==
On the east side of the church is a 19th-century rubble stone wall containing iron gates and re-used 14th-century gargoyles. This is designated as a Grade II listed edifice.

== See also ==
- List of churches preserved by the Churches Conservation Trust in the English Midlands
- Grade II* listed buildings in Nottinghamshire
- Listed buildings in Cotham, Nottinghamshire
