= American Purity Alliance =

- Predecessor: New York Committee for the Prevention of State Regulation of Vice
- Formation: 1895
- Founder: Abby Hopper Gibbons
- Founded at: Manhattan, New York
- Legal status: charity
- Purpose: prevent attempts at state or city regulation of prostitution; suppression of the white slave traffic; promotion of sex hygiene
- Headquarters: New York City; Baltimore
- Origins: New York
- Region served: United States
- Products: Publications
- Services: distribution of purity literature; national conferences
- Fields: Social purity movement
- Main organ: The Philanthropist
- Affiliations: International Federation for the Abolition of State Regulation of Vice

American Purity Alliance was an American social purity organization that worked to prevent attempts at state or city regulation of prostitution. It incorporated under this name in 1895, as the continuation of the New York Committee for the Prevention of State Regulation of Vice, which commenced its work in 1876 and held thirty annual meetings. It was particularly interested in the promotion of sex hygiene, the distribution of purity literature, and the suppression of the white slave traffic.

== New York Committee for the Prevention of State Regulation of Vice ==
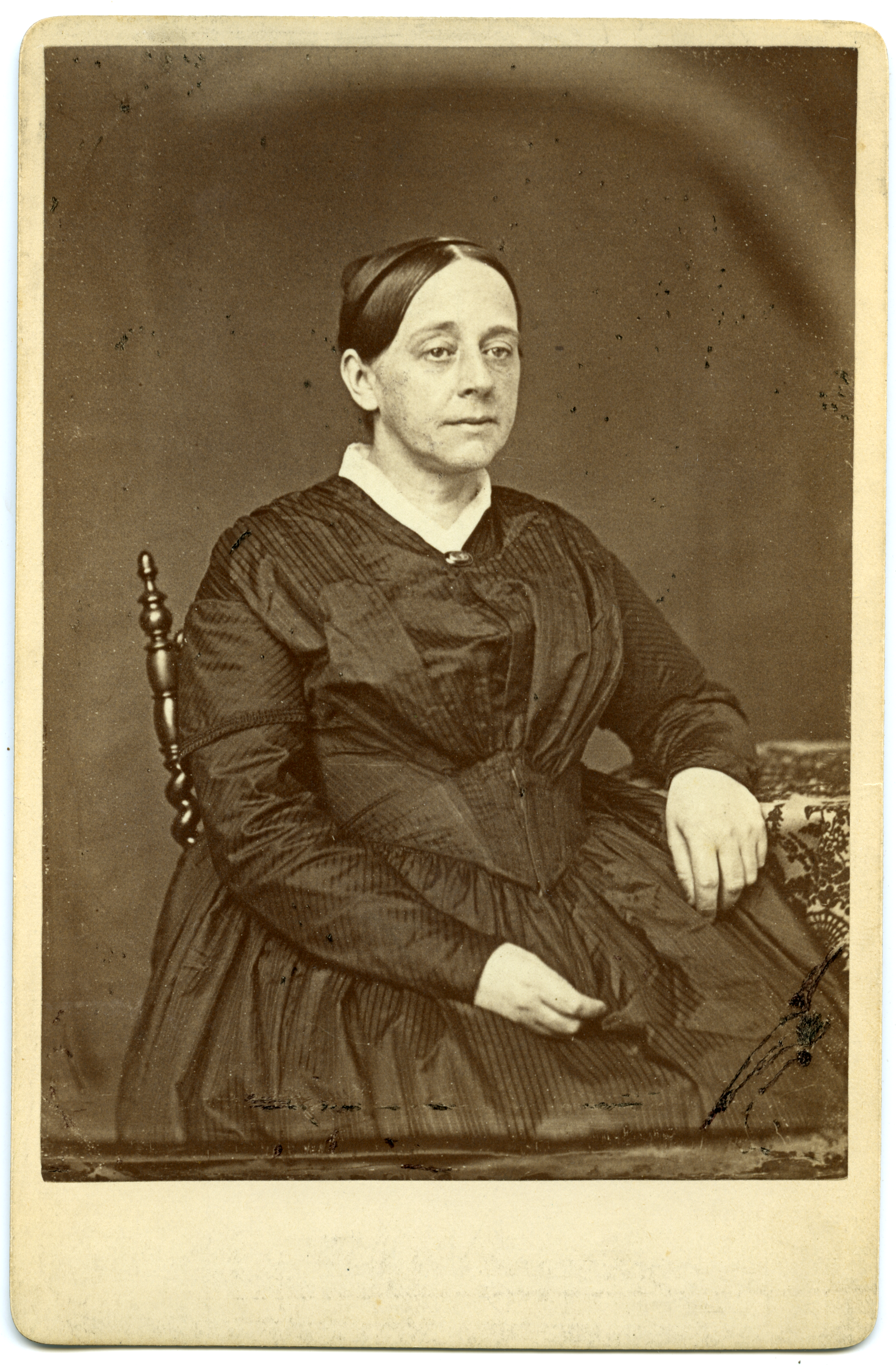
Abby Hopper Gibbons, 18 years president of the New York Committee for the Prevention of State Regulation of Vice

The nucleus of the American Purity Alliance was formed in the summer of 1876 and was then called the New York Committee for the Prevention of State Regulation of Vice. The Rev. Abby Hopper Gibbons, a daughter of Isaac Hopper, was its president. It was organized in response to an appeal that came to the New York group from the International Federation for the Abolition of State Regulation of Vice, of which an influential English physician, Dr. John Birkbeck Nevins, of Liverpool, was president, Professor James Stuart, M. P., of London, was Honorary Secretary, and the honored Josephine E. Butler of England was the inspired leader. The delegates sent over by the Federation were the Rev. J. P. Gledstone, of London, and Henry J. Wilson, M. P., of Sheffield. The winter previous to their arrival, some New Yorkers had been active in protesting against an attempt, in their Legislature, to introduce the system of legalized prostitution. The New Yorkers were therefore better prepared to welcome the message of warning which the British brought, and which it was their great concern to have widely extended in the U.S. The British delegates had good evidence that it was the purpose of the Regulationists abroad to extend the system internationally, and the issues involved were then little understood in the U.S.

The British delegation left some of their literature for the New Yorkers to circulate, which they did to the best of their ability. But the New Yorkers soon found that they needed to publish for themselves what was specially suitable for local needs, as it required constant watchfulness to thwart the schemes of those who were persistently plotting to obtain the pro-vice legislation.

The New York group worked on from year to year, doing what they could, not anticipating a long service. But the work grew and enlarged. Through their publications, the constituency extended in most of the States of the U.S. Still, it was not in a concentrated form to gain the strength needed from them, until 1895, when the New York group broadened its basis and took the name of The American Purity Alliance, hoping thereby to do more and better work, and to come in closer touch with allies and supporters.

== History ==
Proceeds of the First National Purity Congress, convened by the American Purity Alliance, 1895

This society was incorporated under the laws of the State of New York, in 1895. It was the continuance of an earlier Committee for the Prevention of State Regulation of Vice, which commenced work in 1876.

The chief work of the alliance consisted in organizing methods for the instruction of the young in schools and colleges, for the information of teachers, parents, and physicians in sexual hygiene; the distribution of purity literature, of which a supply of 34 pamphlets was kept on hand at its headquarters; and the publication of The Philanthropist. It was the American branch of the International Federation for the Suppression of State Regulation of Vice. It was actively interested in the suppression of the "White Slave" traffic. Annual dues were US$1.

The headquarters were originally located at 400 West Twenty-third Street, New York City, but later shifted to Baltimore.

In 1908, the president was O. Edward Janney, M.D., Baltimore, Maryland, and the secretary was Percy Russell, Brooklyn, New York.

The Alliance supported the Mann Act.

== Objectives ==
The organization's primary objects were: the repression of prostitution, the prevention of its regulation by the State, the better protection of the young, the rescue of "fallen women", the extension of the White Cross among men, and to maintain the law of purity as equally binding upon men and women.

== Publications ==
The Alliance relied largely on publications for the dissemination of its principles. Its official organ, The Philanthropist, was a monthly periodical devoted to the promotion of purity, the better protection of the young, the repression of vice, and the prevention of its regulation by the state. Published in Baltimore, its price was US$1 per year. The Alliance's leaflet literature covered the various phases of prostitution as a social problem. The leaflets were designed to reach and elevate public sentiment; to gain a regeneration of thought on these matters, and to inspire an affirmative faith in the possibilities of chastity as a basis for the reform needed.

== Notable people ==
- Henry Browne Blackwell
- Cordelia Throop Cole
- Abigail Hopper Gibbons
- Pauline Waddington Holme
- Cornelia Collins Hussey
- Anna Rice Powell
- John Watts (1715–1789)

== Selected works ==
=== The Philanthropist Series ===
1. "LEGAL PROTECTION FOR YOUNG GIRLS," by Aaron M. Powell.
2. "THE STATE AND GIRLHOOD," by Emily Blackwell, M. D.
3. "SAVE THE BOYS," by Rev. J. P. Gledstone,
4. "SOCIAL PURITY THE LATEST AND GREATEST CRUSADE," eight pages, by Frances E. Willard.
5. "THE SACREDNESS OF MOTHERHOOD," by Mrs. Elizabeth P. Bond.
6. "THE WHITE CROSS," by the Rt. Rev. Henry C. Potter D. D. Bishop of New York.
7. "MRS. BUTLER-THE NEW MORAL CRUSADE," with portrait, eight pages, reprinted from The Christian, London.
8. "THE DOUBLE STANDARD OF MORALITY," by Mrs. J. E. Butler.
9. "CLEAN LIPS," by Rev. J. P. Gledstone.
10. "How TO ORGANIZE THE WHITE CROSS-ITS OBJECTS AND METHODS," eight pages, by Rev. B. F. De Costa, D. D.
11. "THE SACREDNESS OF FATHERHOOD," by Rev. A. H. Lewis, D. D
12. "GUARDING THE YOUNG," by Mrs. Elizabeth Powell Bond.
13. "AGE OF CONSENT" LEGISLATION. by Rev. A. H. Lewis, D. D.
14. "Need of COMBINATION AMONG WOMEN for Self-ProTECTION, eight pages, by Emily Blackwell, M. D.
15. "THE SIN OF IMPURITY," 8pp., by Rev. Canon Wilberforce, A. M.
16. "DRINK AND VICE," by Aaron M. Powell.
17. "WAGES AND VICE," by Rev. A. H. Lewis, D. D.
18. "HIGH IDEALS OF PURITY," eight pages, by Anna Rice Powell.
19. "LAW AND IMMORALITY," by Rev. A. H. LEWIS, D. D.
20. "SOCIAL VICE AND NATIONAL DECAY." 8pp. by Rev. W. T. Sabine.
21. “GIRLHOOD AND PURITY"-A PORTION OF A PRIVATE LETTER TO GIRLS, eight pages, by GRACE H. DODGE.
22. "REGULATION FALLACIES"-Vice not a "Necessity,"-eight pages, by Emily Blackwell, M. D.
23. "THE NEED FOR WORK TO PROMOTE SOCIAL PURITY,”—eight pages, by Elizabeth Powell Bond.
24. "AN EARNEST APPEAL TO YOUNG WOMEN," by a Friend.
25. "THE WHITE CROSS IN EDUCATION." 8pp., by F. E. Willard.
26. "A MOTHER'S LETTER TO HER SON," by Mrs. Mary Clement Leavitt.
27. " MESSAGE TO YOUNG MEN-WILD OATS," eight pages, by Rev. J. P. Gledstone.
28. "SOCIAL PURITY-THE RIGHT TRAINING OF CHILDREN," eight pages, by Edward B. Rawson.
29. "MEDICAL DECLARATION CONCERNING CHASTITY," eight pages, signed by many Physicians.

=== White Cross Pledges ===
- I.-White Cross Pledge for men.
- II.-Silver Cross for boys.
- III.-Woman's Pledge for Purity.
- IV.-Daughters of the Temple (pledge for girls).
