= Antoinette Martignoni =

American artist (1918–2018)

Antoinette Martignoni (born Antoinette Bremner Walker; December 8, 1918 – August 20, 2018) was an American artist who developed the "Inner Portrait" process that uses art as a self-help means to see hidden personal potential.

== Early life ==
Born as Antoinette B. Walker in Brooklyn, New York in December 1918, she was the great-granddaughter of James McCune Smith, the first African-American medical doctor with a university degree in the United States.

Martignoni was the first graduate to receive the degree in Applied Arts from the University of Pennsylvania in 1941. In addition, she received a Diploma in Illustration from the Pennsylvania Museum and School of Industrial Art, now known as the University of the Arts (Philadelphia).

== Career ==
=== Illustration ===
She was a creative director and partner at Koelling/Martignoni & Co., Westport, Connecticut, and later founder of Martignoni & Co., a graphics and illustration firm in Fairfield, Connecticut. Martignoni created illustrations for large United States corporations (such as Avis Rent A Car System, Pepsi, H. J. Heinz Company, Nabisco, and Duracell). As an illustrator for some of the top engineering firms from the 1960s through the 1980s, Martignoni produced illustrations of futuristic engineering projects, such as the Boston Tunnel that became known as the Big Dig and America's first people mover that was built at the West Virginia University. In 1973, Martignoni illustrated an instructional woodworking book by the author Carolyn Meyer, Saw, Hammer, and Paint: Woodworking and Finishing for Beginners.

=== Involved in Pathwork ===
Involved in the Pathwork process developed by John Pierrakos. Beginning in the 1960s, Martignoni was present at many of the lectures channelled by Eva Broch Pierrakos. Martignoni explored EST, which became Landmark Education in the 1980s, and was in charge of assistants in Connecticut. As an artist, Martignoni sought ways to unite human potential with art. She explored Zen drawing classes with therapist and poet Gunilla Norris and practised a form of Painting from the Source, as created by Aviva Gold, with a group of women artists.

Influenced by writers Frederick Franck (The Zen of Seeing), Caroline Myss (Anatomy of Spirit), and Julia Cameron (The Artist’s Way), Martignoni began to use the power of art to connect people with their potential. In 1993, she drew her first Inner Portrait at age 74.

=== Portrait artist ===
Martignoni has drawn more than 700 Inner Portraits since 1993. The portraits are in an illustrative style in which people and shapes are easily recognizable, with a subtext of hidden symbols and images. As a self-help technique that incorporates art with personal development, Martignoni developed a process of “reading” the portrait to uncover a story about the subject of the portrait. Making the emotional, spiritual, or psychological connection with people is the keystone of the Inner Portrait process.

Martignoni was interviewed on TV by Heather Kovar for News 12 Connecticut in May 2006 and an Inner Portrait drawing was used as the cover art for Natural Awakenings magazine in September 2006.

== Personal life ==
She was a member of the Albertson Memorial Church in Greenwich, Connecticut. Martignoni died in August 2018 at the age of 99.
