= Anna Rice Powell =

American activist

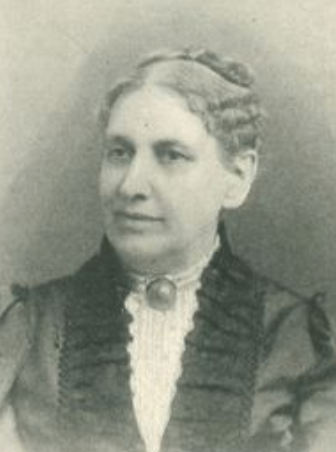
- Anna Rice Powell, from an 1895 publication
- Born: Judith Anna Rice; February 15, 1834; Worcester, Massachusetts
- Died: March 27, 1915 (aged 81); Philadelphia, Pennsylvania
- Occupations: Temperance, suffrage, abolition activist, educator
- Spouse: Aaron Macy Powell
- Relatives: Elizabeth Powell Bond (sister-in-law)

Judith Anna Powell Rice (February 15, 1834 – March 27, 1915) was an American educator and activist in the causes of temperance, abolition, social purity, and women's suffrage.

== Early life and education ==
Rice was born in Worcester, Massachusetts, the daughter of Sewell Rice and Hannah Drew Washburn Rice. She trained as a teacher at the Oread Collegiate Institute.

== Activism ==
=== Abolition and suffrage ===
Rice was a school teacher in Utica, New York in the 1850s. She was elected president of the Ghent Anti-Slavery Society in 1861, and active in the New England Anti-Slavery Convention. She co-founded New Jersey's first women's club in 1872. She was president of the Union County Woman Suffrage Association, and both she and her husband were active in the New Jersey Woman Suffrage Association. In 1899, she published her late husband's memoir, Personal Reminiscences of the Anti-slavery and Other Reforms and Reformers.

=== Social purity and temperance ===
Powell worked with the Society of Friends on publications and committees, including as superintendent of the department of "purity and demoralizing publications". She was a member of the General Friends Conferences Union for Philanthropic Labor, and was an officer of the American Purity Alliance. She represented the New York Commission for the Prevention of State Regulation of Vice at a meeting of the International Council of Women in 1888. An 1895 report on the alliance described Powell as "a charming lady, whose kind heart has brought her into close contact with frail and erring women," and quoted her as saying "How blessed are those whose parents wisely teach both son and daughter that they have equal responsibilities to God and society for a pure life."

In 1896, Powell and her husband were delegates to the International Federation for the Abolition of State Regulation of Vice; she was elected a delegate to the same body in 1901. She was associate editor of The Philanthropist, a social purity magazine her husband founded.

== Personal life ==
Rice married Aaron Macy Powell in 1861, without any civil or religious service. They announced their union in a local newspaper, with a paragraph protesting the gender inequalities imposed by legal marriage. She became a Quaker after they wed. Their daughter Anna died as a small child in 1867. Her husband died at a convention in 1899. She died in 1915, at the age of 81, at a Quaker boarding house in Philadelphia.
