= Henrietta Meeteer =

American classics professor (1857–1956)

Henrietta J. Meeteer
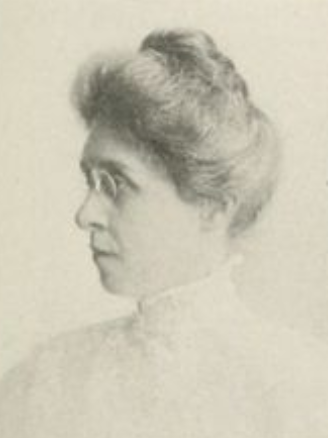
- Henrietta J. Meeteer, from the 1921 yearbook of Swarthmore College
- Born: June 1, 1857; La Porte, Indiana, United States
- Died: November 18, 1956 (aged 99); Haddonfield, New Jersey, United States
- Occupation(s): College dean, professor of Greek and Latin

Henrietta Josephine Meeteer (June 1, 1857 – November 18, 1956) was an American classics professor and philologist. She taught Latin and Greek at Swarthmore College, and was a dean of the college from 1906 to 1918.

== Early life and education ==
Henrietta "Nettie" Meeteer was born in La Porte, Indiana, the daughter of Joseph Chamberlin Meeteer and Henrietta Churchman Meeteer. She trained as a teacher at the University of Pennsylvania, then earned a bachelor's degree from Indiana University Bloomington in 1901. She held the Frances Sargent Pepper fellowship in classical languages at the University of Pennsylvania from 1901 to 1904. She completed doctoral studies there, in her forties, with a dissertation titled The Artists of Pergamum (1904).

== Career ==
Meeteer taught school as a young woman. She was Dean of Women at the University of Colorado from 1904 to 1906. She joined the faculty of Swarthmore College in 1906, as Dean (later Dean of Women), succeeding Elizabeth Powell Bond. Her Opening Day address to the student body in 1906 included this declaration:

I come here as your friend, your co-worker. Not to look on from the outside, but to stand shoulder to shoulder with you always. If you need a mother, my heart is ready to respond to that call; if you need a sister, a friend, a comrade in pleasure, that is what I want to be — what I am here to be. Everything that concerns you concerns me — your work, your pleasures, your difficulties. Nothing that affects you is too trivial to claim my interest, my sympathy. Whatever the limitations and deficiencies I bring to my work as your dean, I can promise a deep and unfailing sympathy.

She helped to organize the first national conference of deans of women at state universities in 1905, and served on the executive committee for another national conference of deans of women in 1914. She resigned as dean in 1918, but continued at Swarthmore as a professor of Latin and Greek.

== Publications ==
- The Artists of Pergamum (1904)
- "The Value of Higher Education in the Home" (1908)

== Personal life ==
Meeteer died in 1956, at the age of 99, in Haddonfield, New Jersey.
