= Cordelia Throop Cole =

American social reformer (1833–1900)

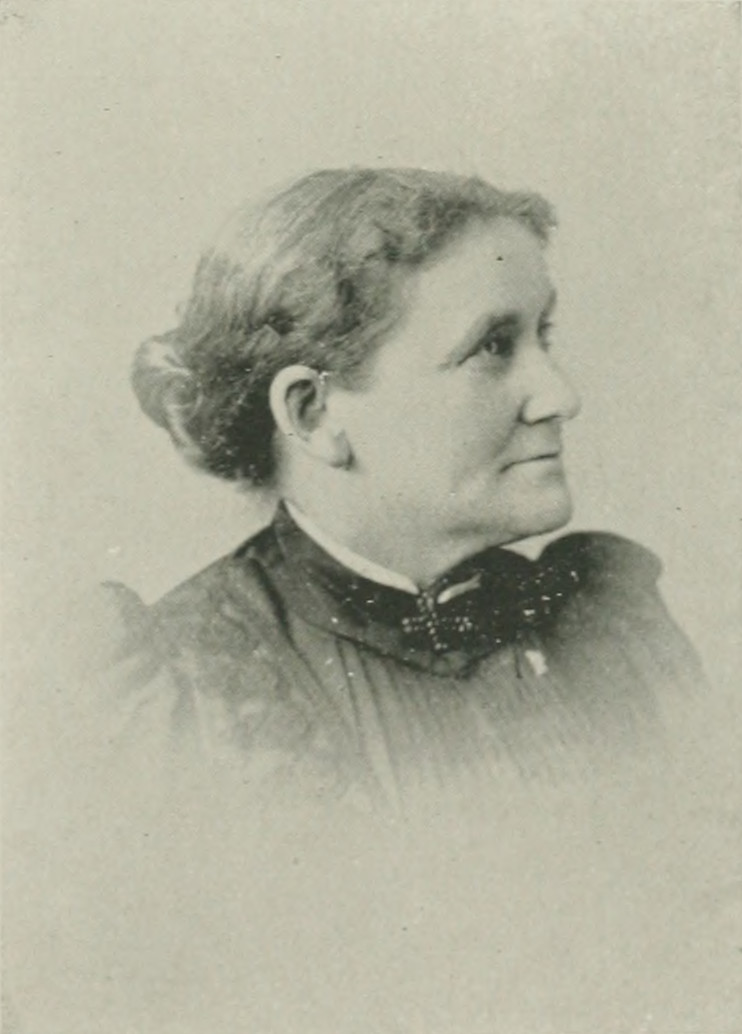
- Photo in A Woman of the Century
- Born: Cordelia Throop; November 17, 1833; Hamilton, New York, U.S.
- Died: April 29, 1900 (aged 66); Mount Pleasant, Iowa, U.S.
- Resting place: Forest Home Cemetery, Mount Pleasant, Iowa
- Education: Hamilton Academy
- Spouse: William Ramey Cole (m. 1856)

Cordelia Throop Cole (née, Throop; November 17, 1833 – April 29, 1900) was a 19th-century American social reformer, who lectured, wrote, and edited on behalf the temperance crusade and social purity movement. She made valuable contributions with her writing to the work of temperance and social purity, and frequently addressed large audiences on these subjects. She took a most conspicuous part in the temperance crusade of her state, riding many miles on her lecture trips, and sometimes holding three or four meetings at different locations within a day. In 1885, she was made the Iowa superintendent of the "White Shield and White Cross" work of the Woman's Christian Temperance Union (WCTU). She was one of the managing editors of the Dial of Progress of Mount Pleasant.

== Early life and education ==
Cordelia Throop was born in the town of Hamilton, New York, November 17, 1833. Her parents were George A. and Deborah (Goldsmith) Throop. Her mother died in March 1836, when Cordelia was two years of age. Her father died when she was young, leaving Cordelia and a brother, James, two years younger than herself. She was then taken in charge by her grandparents, Richard and Ruth Goldsmith.

She received her education in what was then Hamilton Academy (now Colgate University). Having religious aspirations, she had decided to go as a missionary to India when her school days were over, but this was subsequently abandoned, by reason of marked change in religious belief. Just before graduation, she accepted an offer to live with an aunt and an uncle in Galesburg, Illinois, and fill a position as a teacher in that locale.

== Career ==
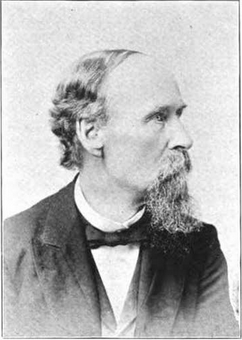
William Ramey Cole

She was for four years principal in a private seminary for young people in Keokuk, Iowa, under the management of R. M. Reynolds, and accepted later a similar position in the North Illinois Institute at Henry, Illinois. Here, in 1856, she married William Ramey Cole. In 1863, Mr. and Mrs. Cole, with their three young boys, went to Cambridge, Massachusetts, where Mr. Cole took a course in Harvard Divinity School, was ordained as a Unitarian minister, and went to Mount Pleasant, Iowa.

From 1876 to 1884, she was secretary of the Iowa Unitarian Association. She could do this work from the home, being otherwise devoted to family life and the education of her children, E. C, Ralph G., H. A., Clara, Ollieand Arthur; lost one daughter.

An important part of her work at this time was the development of the post office mission, which became a firmly-established branch of Unitarian work. She was often called to fill vacancies in the pulpit of the denomination, and on two occasions gave the charge at ordination services. In 1885, she was made state superintendent of the Iowa WCTU department of the "White Shield and the White Cross." In this work, she attended conferences, formed religious clubs, and road many miles to meet an appointment, sometimes holding three or four meetings at different locations within twenty-four hours. Cole delivered hundreds of addresses in Iowa and other states. She was at one time assistant to Frances Willard, but in 1889, on the division among the workers, growing out of the political affiliations of the large body, she resigned. After the Non-Partisan National Woman's Christian Temperance Union organized, she accepted the position of national superintendent, still maintaining her allegiance to the Iowa work. In 1896, she was general secretary of the Iowa Prohibitory Amendment League, a state body which had its headquarters at Mount Pleasant.

Cole also became involved in the WCTU's social purity movement in the 1880s and 1890s. She made hundreds of public addresses. She served as vice-president for Iowa of the American Purity Alliance. Her lectures to women audiences were a marked feature of her work, and her published leaflets, Helps in Mother Work and A Manual for Social Purity Workers, were considered admirable. With her husband, she edited the Champion of Progress, a state paper, published at Mount Pleasant.

Cole was interested in public affairs and literature. She led the first Reading Clubs of Mount Pleasant, and was a co-founder of the Ladies Library Association.

== Death ==
She died at Mount Pleasant, April 29, 1900, and was buried at Forest Home Cemetery, in Mount Pleasant.

== Selected works ==
=== Leaflets ===
- Helps in Mother Work
- A Manual for Social Purity Workers
