= Florence M. Rice =

American community activist (1919–2020)

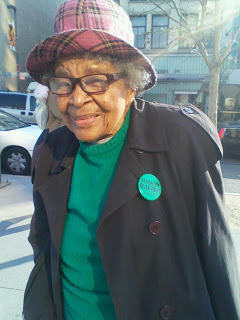
- Born: March 22, 1919; Buffalo, New York, U.S.
- Died: March 19, 2020 (aged 100); New York, U.S.
- Occupations: Consumer rights and Labor activist

Florence M. Rice (March 22, 1919 – March 19, 2020) was an American Harlem-based consumer activist and educator, particularly known for her work in advocating for the rights of minority consumers and her efforts in addressing issues related to economic justice. She was the founder of the Harlem Consumer Education Council, was nicknamed the "Ralph Nader of Harlem", and the "mother of the Harlem Consumer Movement".

== Early life ==
Florence M. Rice was born in Buffalo, New York, on March 22, 1919. Florence's family immigrated to the United States from the West Indies before she was born. She spent many years in the Colored Orphan Asylum, one of the first charitable institutions dedicated to the needs of African-American children. Florence M. Rice was the founder of the Harlem Consumer Education Council, Inc. in the 1960s. It is a private, non-profit, consumer advocacy organization, established to address issues of poverty, neglect, and exploitation confronting poor and low-income citizens in New York City's Harlem community.

Rice was an early champion for abortion rights for women. She spoke out openly about her life in the 1930s, as a young woman working at a laundry mat in Harlem, and having an illegal abortion. Rice became a prominent consumer advocate in the 1960s and 1970s. She founded the Harlem Consumer Education Council in 1967, which aimed to educate and protect minority consumers in Harlem and other underserved communities. In 1969, she joined other outspoken women in talking openly about their illegal abortion experiences. Her work focused on issues such as deceptive advertising, predatory lending, and unfair business practices that disproportionately affected African Americans and other minorities.

== Career ==
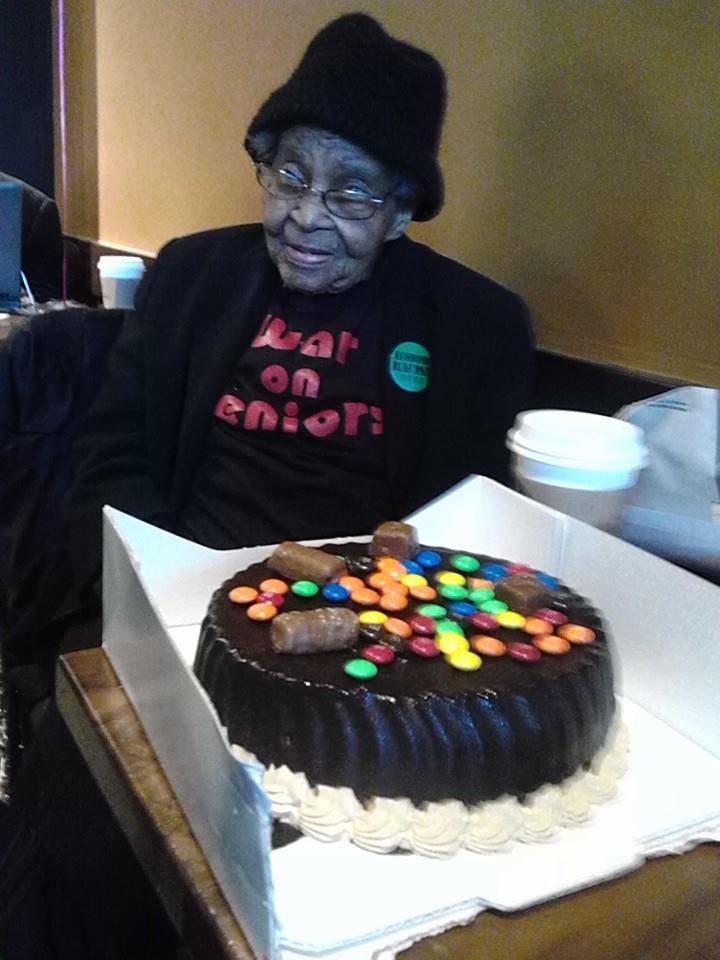
Florence M. Rice's 96th birthday celebration in Harlem.

After completing the eighth grade, Florence Rice went to work as a domestic seamstress. She became a member of the International Ladies Garment Workers Union. In 1962, she participated in a congressional hearing held by Adam Clayton Powell Jr., which probed discriminatory union policies and practices towards African Americans and Latinos. She testified regarding the situation in the International Ladies' Garment Workers' Union. It is noted that after the congressional hearings, Rice was blacklisted and marginalized by the garment industry, which prompted her to start the Harlem Consumer Education Council in the 1960s. Rice was a member of ILGWU Local 155, and it is documented in the book Race Traitor, by Noel Ignatiev and John Garvey, that she said she was told that if she testified at the Congressional Committee Hearings before the Ad Hoc Subcommittee on the Investigation of the Garment Industry, she would "never work again in the garment industry".

The Harlem Consumer Education Council waged boycotts and picket lines against many Harlem grocery stories that would not hire African Americans. Rice also challenged corporations that discriminated against African Americans. One of her biggest victories was against the New York State Public Service Commission, which was forced to stop charging low-income residents pre-installation fees.

Rice organized Harlem housewives to check store prices and products. They picketed supermarkets and once closed a paint store in Harlem for false advertising that they would give free cans of paint. Her early experiences documented in an article by Caroline Bird in New York Magazine, titled "Black Womanpower", on March 10, 1969.

Rice was known for her educational efforts, conducting workshops, seminars, and public speaking engagements to raise awareness about consumer rights and economic issues. She was a powerful voice in advocating for financial literacy and economic empowerment in minority communities.

Florence M. Rice is a board director member for the Consumer Federation of America.

In the early days of the women's movement, Rice was a long-time friend and activist associate of Florynce Kennedy. Correspondence between them can be found in Harvard University's Arthur and Elizabeth Schlesinger Library on the History of Women in America. (Papers of Florynce Kennedy).

=== 1970s ===
In the 1970s, Rice was appointed Special Consultant to the Consumer Advisory Council of the Federal Reserve Board. She has taught consumer education at Malcolm-King Harlem College.

During the 1970s, Rice was appointed Special Consultant to the Consumer Advisory Council of the Federal Reserve Board.

In 1975, she was an Official Member of the United States Delegation to the World Congress of the International Women's Year in Berlin.

In 1976, she was a representative to the United Nations Congress of Non-governmental Organizations.

=== 1980s ===
In the 1988 presidential election, Rice was one of former U.S. Senator Eugene McCarthy's vice-presidential running mates only in Michigan, New Jersey, and Pennsylvania. She received a total of 25,109 votes.

=== 1990s ===
In the 1990, Rice was the initiator for the creation of the Bell Atlantic Technology Center in Harlem. The center's focus was getting the latest technology in the hands of students, senior citizens, and the community.

In 1998 the outspoken Rice and other community activists in New York City challenged Reverend Calvin Butts' endorsement of George Pataki for governor.

In 1999, she, along with community activists and Con Edison workers, protested outside of Con Edison annual shareholders' meeting at Madison Square Garden protesting the shutting down of customer service office in Harlem.

=== 2000s–2020s ===
In the 2000s, Rice again confronted social justice issues, when her apartment was gutted. She stated that her apartment was gutted under the guise of renovating it, and trying to force her out of her apartment. It was destroyed.

On November 26, 2004, in New York, a bill was put in place, and a proclamation given to Rice. The bill was named in her honor. Her battle with landlords set off many demonstrations and brought awareness to unwarranted evictions of elderly citizens. "With this bill, landlords will no longer be allowed to evict our senior citizens without recourse," Barron told a group of supporters gathered at the steps of City Hall. "Landlords now must go through the Housing Preservation and Development Department before any action can be taken." "This law is named in tribute to Florence Rice who has been unfazed by the most daunting challenges from Con-Ed and New York Telephone," reads the proclamation given to Rice, said Paul Washington, Barron's chief of staff.

In 2014, she launched the War on Seniors Campaign. This campaign lasted six months, when every year from April to October efforts were made to address issues that relate to senior citizens.

Rice hosted a weekly show 30 Minutes with Florence Rice on Manhattan Neighborhood Network.

Even in her later years, Rice remained active in her advocacy work, continuing to inspire new generations of activists and community leaders. She died in 2020, leaving behind a legacy of significant contributions to consumer rights and civil rights in the United States. Rice died in New York on March 19, 2020, three days shy of her 101st birthday.

=== Awards ===
- Florence Rice is the recipient of the Lane Bryant Award for volunteer Service, The Sojourner Truth Award
- The Ophelia DeVore Award for Community Service
- The National Urban League Frederick Douglass Award
- The Consolidated Edison Better Business Award
- The Josephine Shaw Lowell Award
- The New York Consumer Assembly Prestigious Special Award
- The Harold C. Burton Republican Club's 1977 Woman of the Year Award
- On June 29, 2006, Ms Florence Rice was interviewed and became a part of The HistoryMakers.
