= John Stauffer (professor) =

American professor

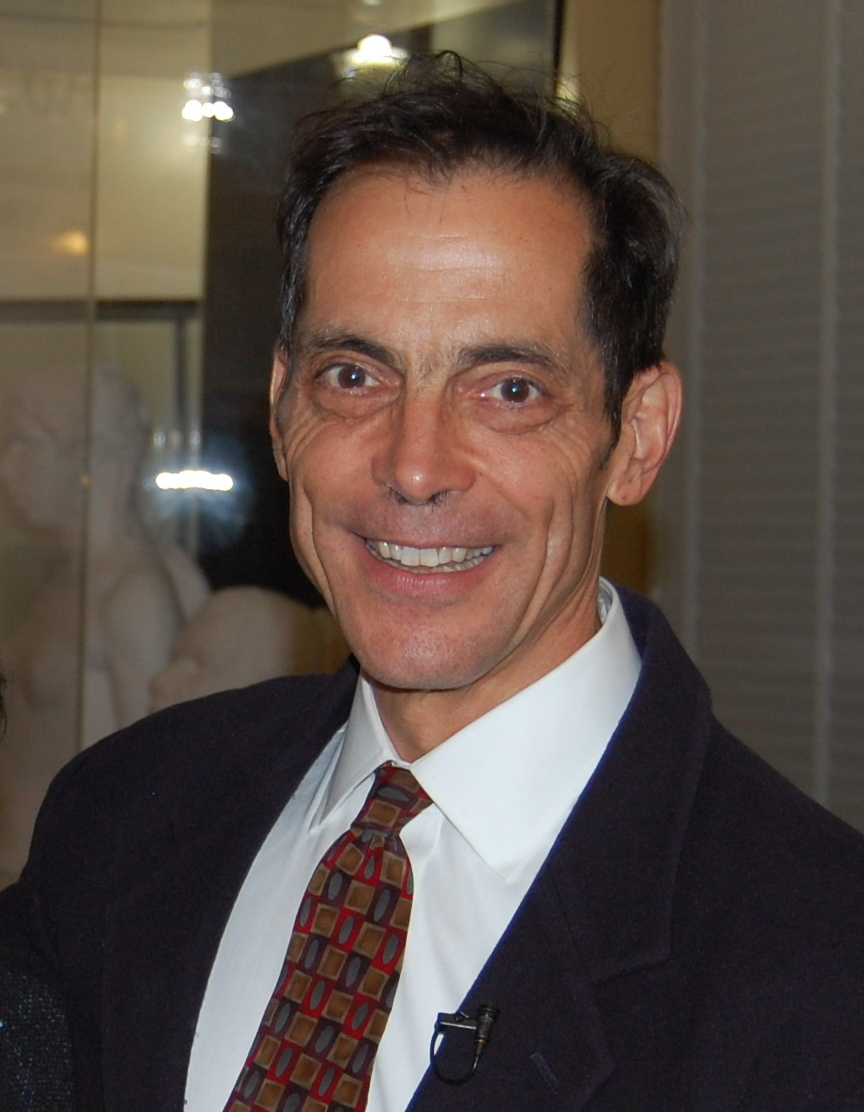
- Stauffer in 2014
- Education: Yale University
- Occupations: Author, Professor, Social historian
- Scientific career
- Fields: English, American Studies, African American Studies
- Workplaces: Harvard University

John Stauffer is an American social historian, and Professor of English, American Studies, and African American Studies at Harvard University. He writes and lectures on the Civil War era, antislavery, social protest movements, and photography.

== Education and career ==
Stauffer received his Ph.D. in American Studies from Yale University in 1999, began teaching at Harvard University that year, and was tenured in 2004. He was the Chair of History and Literature and Professor of English and African and African American Studies in 2013, Chair of the History of American Civilization and Professor of English and African and African American Studies from 2006 to 2012, and Professor of English, History of American Civilization, and African and African American Studies from 2004 to 2006. He lives in Cambridge, Massachusetts with his wife, Deborah Cunningham, and their two children, Erik and Nicholas.

He is the author and editor of eleven books, including two books that were briefly national bestsellers: GIANTS: The Parallel Lives of Frederick Douglass and Abraham Lincoln (2008), which won the Iowa Author Award and a Boston Authors Club Award and has been translated into Mandarin, Arabic, and Korean; and The State of Jones (2009), co-authored with Washington Post columnist Sally Jenkins. His first book, The Black Hearts of Men: Radical Abolitionists and the Transformation of Race (2002), won the Frederick Douglass Prize and Avery Craven Book Prize and was the Lincoln Prize runner-up.

His most recent books are The Battle Hymn of the Republic: A Biography of the Song that Marches On (2013), co-authored with Benjamin Soskis, which was a Lincoln Prize finalist and a Best Book of 2013 from Civil War Memory and from Russell Moore; and Southern Landscape, with photographs by Sally Mann (2014). Stauffer's essays and reviews have appeared in Time, The Wall Street Journal, The New York Times, The Washington Post, Huffington Post, The New Republic, Raritan, and numerous scholarly journals and books. He has lectured in Europe and Asia for the State Department's International Information Programs. In 2009, Harvard University named him the Walter Channing Cabot Fellow for "achievements and scholarly eminence in the fields of literature, history, or art."

Stauffer appeared in the PBS documentary The Abolitionists and was an advisor for the film. He was also a consultant for the PBS documentaries The African American Express: Many Rivers to Cross (2013) and God in America (2010). He was also a consultant to the 2012–2014 exhibition WAR/PHOTOGRAPHY and contributed an essay to the exhibition catalogue.

== Awards ==
- 2013: Lincoln Prize finalist for The Battle Hymn of the Republic
- 2013: Best Books of 2013 for The Battle Hymn of the Republic: Civil War Memory and Moore to the Point
- 2010: Bancroft Prize Juror (one of three), Columbia University
- 2009–10: Walter Channing Cabot Fellow, Harvard University, for “achievements and scholarly eminence in the fields of literature, history or art.”
- 2009: Purdue University, College of Liberal Arts, Distinguished Alumni Award
- 2009: Iowa Author Award (for GIANTS)
- 2009: Boston Authors Club Award: “Highly Recommended” (3rd Place) (for GIANTS)
- 2008: Association of American University Presses (AAUP) “must have” selection for Public and Secondary School Libraries (for The Problem of Evil, with Steven Mintz)
- 2007: Joseph R. Levenson Memorial Teaching Prize Nomination
- 2005: Everett Mendelsohn Excellence in Mentoring Award
- 2005: Nineteenth-Century Studies Association, runner-up for the best essay (Meteor of War: The John Brown Story, “Introduction,” with Zoe Trodd).
- 2003: Avery O. Craven Award for the most original book on the coming of the Civil War, the Civil War, or the era of Reconstruction, from the Organization of American Historians (for The Black Hearts of Men)
- 2003: Lincoln Prize, Second Place Winner, for the best book on Lincoln or theCivil War era, from the Gettysburg Institute (for The Black Hearts of Men)
- 2003: Magill’s Literary Annual award, for The Black Hearts of Men
- 2002: Frederick Douglass Book Prize, Co-Winner, for the best book on slavery, resistance, or abolition, from the Gilder Lehrman Institute (for The Black Hearts of Men)
- 2002: Jan Thaddeus Teaching Prize, History and Literature, Harvard University
- 2000: Dixon Ryan Fox Prize finalist, for the best book-length manuscript on New York State, New York State Historical Association, 2000
- 1999: Ralph Henry Gabriel Prize recipient for the best dissertation in American Studies, American Studies Association
- 1997–98: Teaching Prize Fellowship Nomination, Yale University

== Publications ==
=== Books ===
- Frederick Douglass, The Heroic Slave: A Cultural and Critical Edition, co-edited with Robert S. Levine and John R. McKivigan (New Haven: Yale University Press, 2015).
- Picturing Frederick Douglass: An Illustrated Biography of the Nineteenth Century's Most Photographed American, co-authored with Zoe Trodd and Celeste-Marie Bernier (New York and London: Liveright Publishing Corporation, revised edition, 2015).
- Southern Landscape, photographs by Sally Mann, "Introduction and Reflections" by John Stauffer (Brewster, Mass.: 21st Editions, 2013)
- The Battle Hymn of the Republic: A Biography of the Song That Marches On, co-authored with Benjamin Soskis (New York: Oxford University Press, June 2013).
  - Lincoln Prize Finalist, 2013, for best book on the Civil War era.
  - Best Books of 2013, Civil War Memory: "Best Union Study".
  - Best Books of 2013, Moore to the Point.
  - Best Books of 2013, Civil War Monitor.
- The Abolitionist Imagination, by Andrew Delbanco with commentaries by John Stauffer, Manisha Sinha, Darryl Pinckney, and Wilfred M. McClay (Cambridge, Mass.: Harvard University Press, 2012).
- The State of Jones, co-authored with Sally Jenkins (New York: Doubleday, 2009).
  - New York Times bestseller (nonfiction).
  - More than 30,000 hardcover copies sold.
  - Nominated for a Pulitzer Prize by Doubleday.
- GIANTS: The Parallel Lives of Frederick Douglass and Abraham Lincoln (New York: TWELVE/Hachette Book Group, 2008).
  - Iowa Author Award 2009.
  - Boston Authors Club 2009 award: "highly recommended".
  - Progressive Book Club featured selection.
  - History Book Club featured selection.
  - Boston Globe bestseller (nonfiction).
  - Amazon.com bestseller.
  - Reviewed in more than 100 newspapers and magazines.
  - More than 30,000 hardcover copies sold.
  - Korean, Mandarin, and Arabic translations.
- Prophets Of Protest: Reconsidering the History of American Abolitionism, edited by Timothy Patrick McCarthy and John Stauffer (New York: The New Press, 2006).
- The Works of James McCune Smith: Black Intellectual and Abolitionist, edited by John Stauffer (New York: Oxford University Press, 2006).
- The Black Hearts of Men: Radical Abolitionists and the Transformation of Race (Cambridge: Harvard University Press, 2002).
  - Co-Winner of the Frederick Douglass Book Prize.
  - Winner of the Avery Craven Book Award.
  - Lincoln Prize 2nd Place Winner.
  - Magill’s Literary Annual award for "best serious literature" in 2002.

=== Articles and book reviews ===
- Book Review: The Problem of Slavery in the Age of Emancipation, by David Brion Davis. The Wall Street Journal, January 31, 2014
- Book Review: Another America, by James Ciment, The Wall Street Journal, December 20, 2013
- Gordon, Rachel, "Author Interview with John Stauffer and Benjamin Soskis", Religion in American History, August 28, 2013
- "How the 'Battle Hymn of the Republic' Became America’s hymn", The Christian Century, July 31, 2013
- "Were Hawthorne's Politics 'Disgraceful'?" The New York Review of Books, July 11, 2013
- "Hooker’s Defeat", The Washington Post, April 29, 2013
- "What Every American Should Know About Frederick Douglass, Abolitionist Prophet", HuffPost, January 8, 2013, updated December 6, 2017
- "The Anniversary of the Gettysburg Address", Religion & Politics, November 19, 2012
- "Outlaws Together", The Wall Street Journal, February 24, 2012
- "Civility, Civil Society, and Civil Wars", Civility and American Democracy: A National Forum, sponsored by the NEH, February 2012
- "John Brown Marches On", co-authored with Benjamin Soskis, The New York Times, July 17, 2011
- "Briefly Out of Bondage", The Wall Street Journal, January 6, 2011
- "Fear and Doubt in Cleveland", The New York Times, December 22, 2010
- "The Great Northern Migration", The Wall Street Journal, September 4–5, 2010
- "In a Fury Over Freedom", The Wall Street Journal, March 26, 2010
- "A Pragmatic Precedent" (with Henry Louis Gates Jr.), The New York Times, January 19, 2009.
- "What Obama Can Learn from Lincoln’s Inaugural", The Huffington Post, January 11, 2009.
- Letter to the Editor, on Frederick Douglass and Ralph Waldo Emerson, New York Times Book Review, September 21, 2008, p. 6.
- "Across the Great Divide: The Friendship Between Lincoln and Frederick Douglass required from both a change of heart", Time Magazine, July 4, 2005, pp. 58–65.
- "12 Years Between Life and Death", American Literary History, 26:2 (Summer 2014), pp. 317–325
- "Fear and Doubt in Cleveland", The New York Times, Disunion: 106 Articles from The New York Times Opinionator, ed. Ted Widmer (New York: Black Dog & Leventhal Publishers, 2013), pp. 22–26.
- "The 'Terrible Reality' of the First Living-Room Wars", WAR/PHOTOGRAPHY: Images of Armed Conflict and Its Aftermath, by Anne Wilkes Tucker and Will Michels (Houston and New Haven: Museum of Fine Arts, Houston and Yale University Press, 2012), pp. 80–93.
  - Venues include Museum of Fine Arts, Houston (November 11, 2012 – February 3, 2013); the Annenberg Space for Photography, Los Angeles (March 23–June 2, 2013); The Corcoran Gallery of Art, Washington, D.C. (June 29–September 29, 2013); and the Brooklyn Museum, New York (November 8, 2013 – February 2, 2014).
