= Colored Orphan Asylum =

Institution in New York City

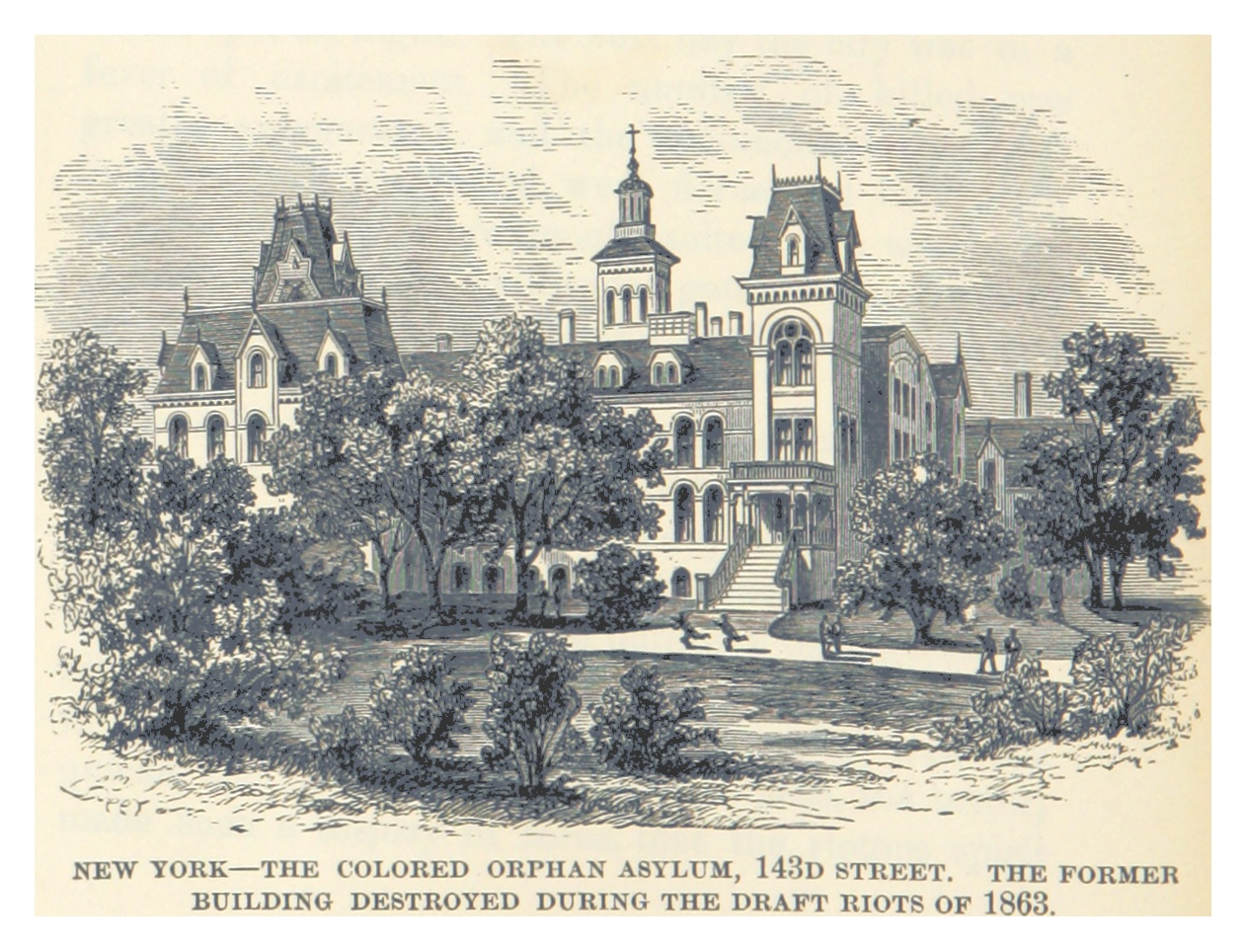
- Colored Orphan Asylum in 1882, after its reconstruction
- Successor: Riverdale Children's Association
- Established: 1836; 190 years ago
- Founders: Anna Shotwell and Mary Murray
- Founded at: Manhattan
- Defunct: 1946; 80 years ago
- Type: Orphanage
- Location(s): Midtown Manhattan (1836–1867); Upper Manhattan (1867–1907); Riverdale, Bronx (1907–1946)
- Region served: New York City
- Key people: James McCune Smith
- Affiliations: Hampton Institute

The Association for the Benefit of Colored Orphans (renamed the Colored Orphan Asylum in 1844) was founded by a group of New York-based Quakers in 1836. This was among the first orphanages in that to provided housing, training, and employment specifically for African-American orphans.

It housed on average four hundred children annually and was mostly managed by women. Its first location was on Fifth Avenue between 42nd and 43rd Streets in Midtown Manhattan, a four-story building with two wings. The Colored Orphan Asylum was burned down by Irish mobs on July 13, 1863 during the first day of the New York Draft Riots. It was rebuilt by Quakers in 1867 in Upper Manhattan and in 1907 moved to Riverdale in the Bronx.

== History ==
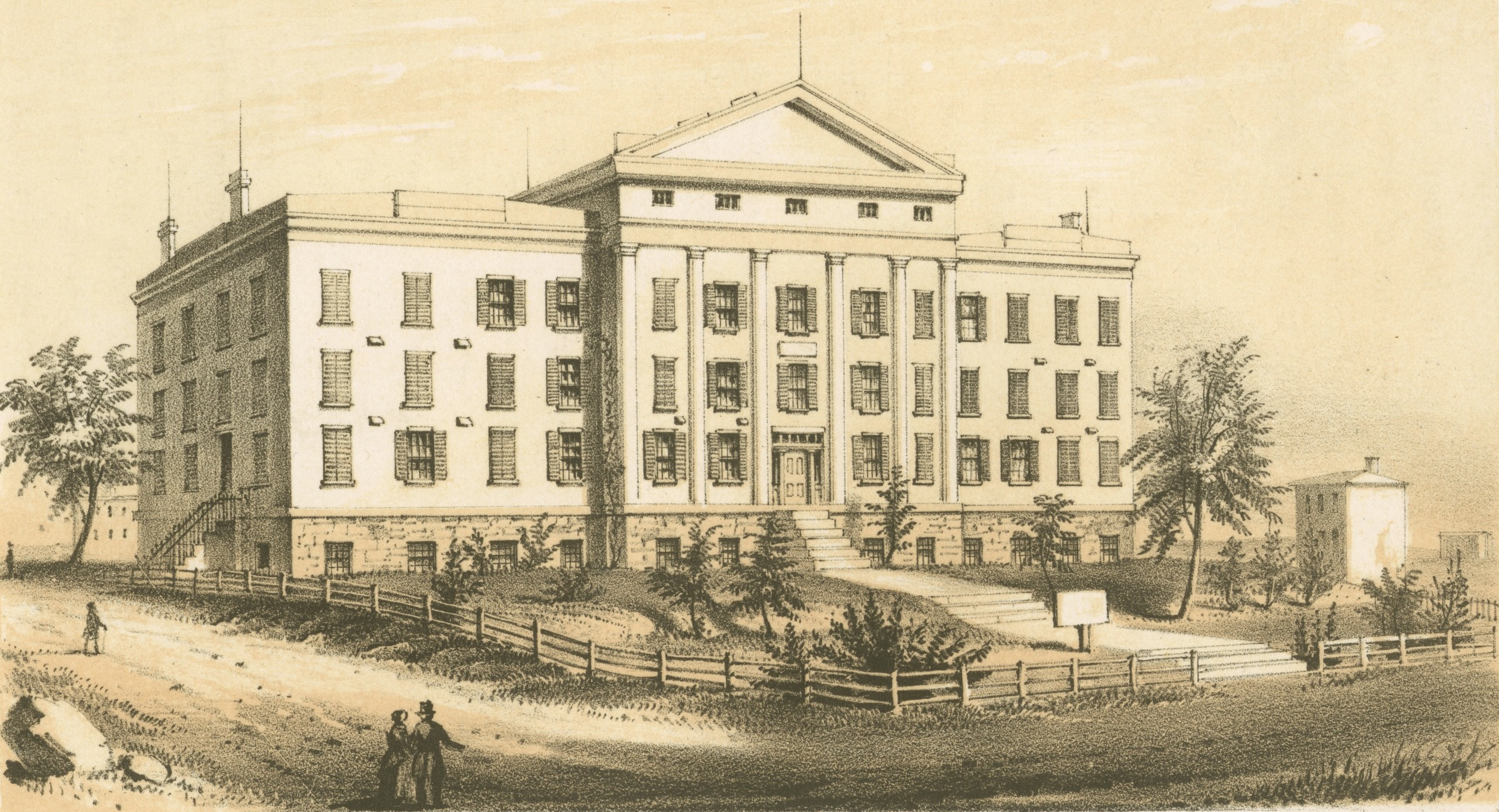
Fist building of the Colored Orphan Asylum in Midtown Manhattan in 1850

The Colored Orphan Asylum was one of the first of its kind in the United States that took in Black children whose parents had died, or were not able to take care of them. By 1830, census records show that approximately 7% of New York's population was Black. Prior to the Colored Orphan Asylum's founding, Black children were primarily excluded from services from most children's institutions, leaving many of them to harsh conditions in local poorhouses.

The orphanage initially offered schooling only for infants, feeling that their wards would not advance far in society due to being Black and orphans. Older children were bound by indentured servitude in which they were contracted to families, both Black and White, to learn a trade or skill until age 21. The families, in turn, paid a small fee to the Colored Orphan Asylum for the services which were placed in the bank for when the child left the institution.In the late 1800s, schooling was increased until grade six and sent several students to the Hampton Institute for further study. In 1918 schooling was increased until grade eight and the indenture system evolved into a loose foster care system in which the child was to be incorporated into the family and continue their studies. In 1846 Dr. James McCune Smith, the country's first licensed African American medical doctor, became the orphanage's medical director. The orphanage moved several times within Manhattan. The 1890 building was designed by T. Henry Randall.

== 1863 riots ==
=== Behind the drafts ===
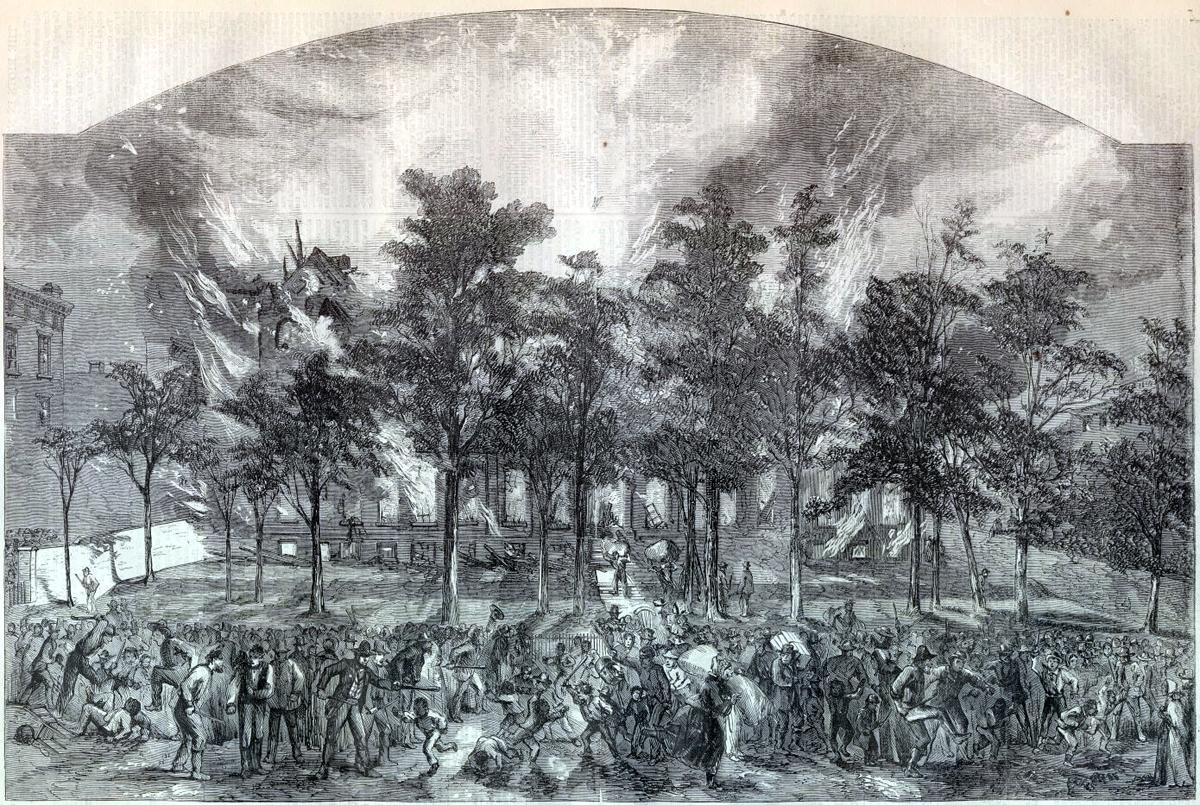
Burning in 1863

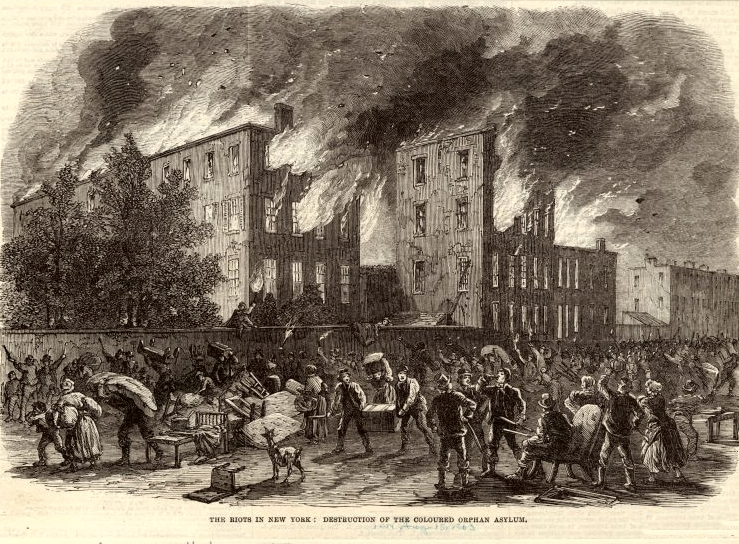
Looting in 1863

In March 1863, conscription in the United States became stricter, and the federal government used a lottery system to choose citizens for the draft. Those chosen could hire a substitute or pay the government, but most working-class men could not afford substitution, while black men were ineligible for the draft. (Note: For nine years, from 1857 to 1866 most Black people in the US were not considered citizens, and so were immune to the draft, although they could (and some did) volunteer. In 1857, the Supreme Court had ruled in Dred Scott that those descended from Africans brought to the US as slaves could not be citizens. This was superseded by the Civil Rights Act of 1866.) Working-class white males, furious about the federal draft laws, which allowed richer whites to pay for substitutes, and did not draft blacks at all, rioted and attacked federal buildings and black neighborhoods.

=== The attack ===
The Colored Orphan Asylum was ransacked and burned down by Irish mobs on July 13, 1863, at about 4:00 pm on the first day of the New York Draft Riots, Monday. It was a pinpoint of the attacks as the orphanage was viewed as a "symbol of white charity of Blacks and of Black upward mobility." However, the few police present were able to secure the orphanage for long enough to allow the orphans to escape before the building was looted and burned down, all 233 orphans were accounted for. The children were taken out by the backdoor of the home and escorted to Twentieth Precinct station house by the Superintendent of the asylum, William E. Davis, where they were received by Sergeant Petty, and housed for three nights. On the Thursday they were taken to by Captain James Todd on Steamboat No. 1. to Blackwell Island (now Roosevelt Island) where the City Hospital was. The loss of building and contents was estimated at $80,000.

=== Contemporary orphanage records ===
==== Minutes of the board meeting ====
The entry for July 25, 1883, describes what had happened: "On the 13th July at 4 PM, an infuriated mob … surrounded the premises of the Asylum and 500 of them entered the house … they deliberately set fire to it … simply because it was the home of unoffending colored orphan children."

==== Admission records ====
The asylum kept records which tracked the admission, current status, and discharge information of each child. One entry, which appeared to be written quickly, says: William H. Judson … admitted Jul. 6, 1863. Left with us just after the riot."

==== Annual report ====
An annual report was released by the Association for the Benefit of Colored Orphan Records covering the year of 1863, published in 1864. The report holds accounts of the events of that day. It includes an account from William E. Davis, the superintendent of the Asylum: "One little girl, as she walked through the dining room, took up a large family bible ... and looking up at the superintendent with a sweet smile ... 'See', said she, 'Mr. Davis, I've got the Bible.' This dear child carried this treasured volume to the station house, and thence to Blackwell's Island." The Bible (now incomplete) is held by the Patricia D. Klingenstein Library as part of the record of Association for the Benefit of Colored Orphans.

== Later buildings ==
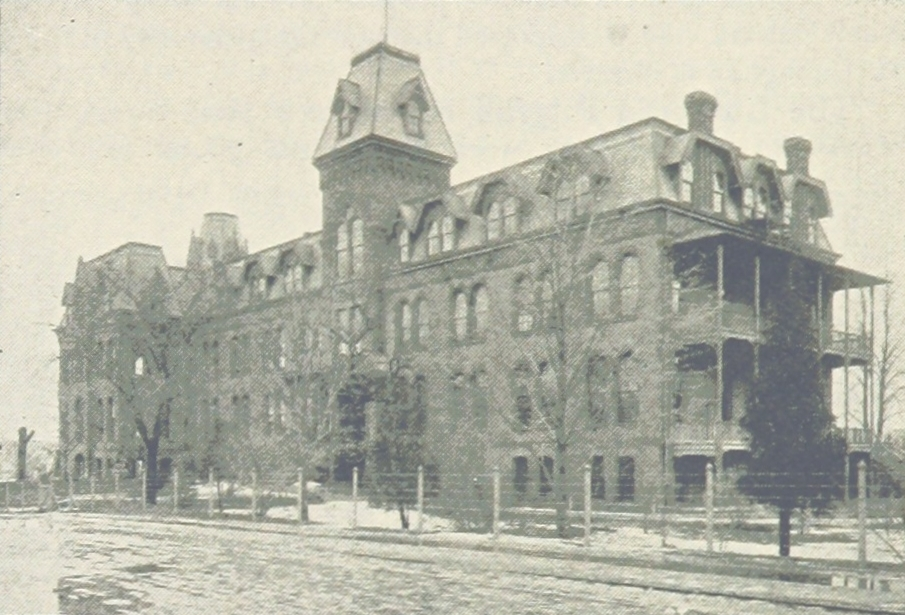
Rebuilt on 143rd Street

=== Rebuild of the orphanage ===
The asylum was rebuilt by the Quakers in 1867 on 143rd Street and Amsterdam Avenue. The operation moved to a new building in 1907, in Riverdale, Bronx. At the new site, the orphanage adopted a new plan to house its wards in cottages, with 25 children and a housemother in each cottage. The new plan was received favorably and encouraged ownership and self-respect in the children.

=== Riverdale Children's Association ===
In 1944, the asylum was renamed the Riverdale Children's Association. The reasoning behind the change was due to controversy over the orphanages condition. Conditions of the orphanage were shared to the press leading to the transition in 1946 to concentrate on foster care and small-group settings.

=== Hebrew Home for the Aged ===
The campus in Riverdale was sold to the Jewish Home for the Aged, a retirement home for the Jewish community, it acquired up to 19 acres in 1951. With the purchase, it allowed accommodation for 150 residents and staffed up to 40 people. In April 1951, the building was renamed the Hebrew Home for the Aged.

=== Harlem Dowling West Side Center for Children and Family Services ===
The association launched a program in 1968 to help families by giving referrals, counselling, and other services to prevent the placement of children in foster care. The service moved to Riverside Drive and 168th Street renaming itself the Westside Center for Family Services. A merger in March 1988 combined the Westside Center with the Harlem-Dowling Children's Services into Harlem Dowling West Side Center for Children and Family Services.

== Legacy ==
The New York Amsterdam News published an article, in 2011, honoring the alumni of the Harlem Dowling "Colored Orphan" Asylum to recognize its history and legacy. The article highlights the 12th Annual Adolescent Awards Luncheon, held in celebration of the 175th anniversary of the Harlem Dowling West Side Center for Children and Family Services. The luncheon includes an awards ceremony honoring Harlem Dowling students for academic excellence, along with performances from youth participants. Alumni in attendance ranged in age from 80 to 92. One, Fritz Harvey, said "Going to the orphanage was the best thing that ever happened to me." Although the organization no longer runs an orphanage, it continues its mission of supporting children and families.

== Notable staff ==
- James McCune Smith (1813-1865), doctor, apothecary, abolitionist and author. Physician at the asylum for nearly 20 years, starting in 1946.
- Cornelia Collins Hussey (1827–1902), philanthropist, suffragist, and writer. A "manager" of the asylum "before she attained her majority".
- Christiana Williams Freeman (1812–1909), seamstress and Underground Railroad activist.

== Notable asylees ==
- James Henry Gooding (1838-1864), journalist, whaler and soldier.
- Williana Burroughs (1882–1945), teacher, communist activist and politician.
- Ella Fitzgerald (1917-1996), jazz singer, composer and songwriter.
- Florence M. Rice (1919–2020), Harlem-based consumer activist and educator.

== See also ==
- Howard Colored Orphan Asylum

== Relevant literature ==
- Seraile, William. Angels of mercy: White women and the history of New York's Colored orphan asylum. Fordham Univ Press, 2013.
- Sappol, Mike. 1990. The Uses of Philanthropy: The Colored Orphan Asylum and Its Clients. Columbia University: MA thesis.
- Riverdale Children's Association, 120th anniversary, 1836–1956. Founded in 1836 as the Association for the Benefit of Colored Orphans by N.Y. Riverdale Children's Association (New York).
- From Cherry Street to Green Pastures: A History of the Colored Orphan Asylum at Riverdale-on-Hudson, 1836–1936 (New York: Riverdale Children's Association, 1936)
