= Cornelia Collins Hussey =

American philanthropist, suffragist and writer (1827–1902)

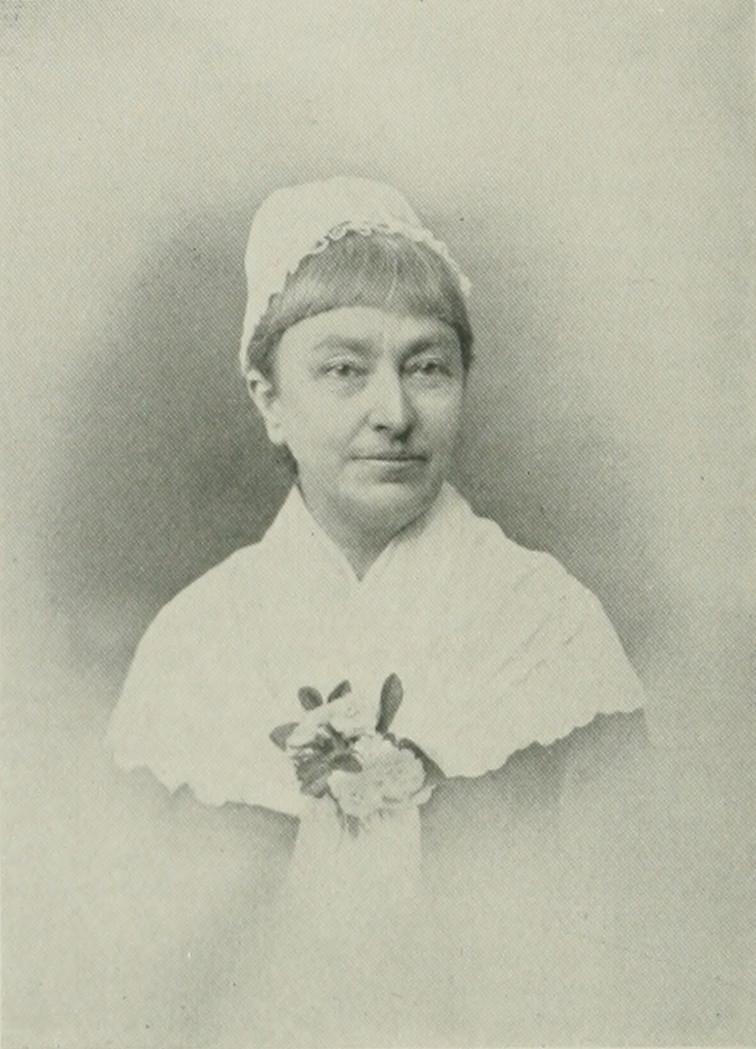
- Photo in A Woman of the Century
- Born: Cornelia Collins; July 7, 1827; Manhattan, New York City, U.S.
- Died: October 13, 1902 (aged 75)
- Resting place: Milton, Ulster County, New York, U.S.
- Occupations: philanthropist; suffragist; writer
- Spouse: William H. Hussey (m. 1851)
- Children: 3
- Relatives: Isaac Collins
- Writing career
- Language: English

Cornelia Collins Hussey (née, Collins; July 7, 1827 – October 13, 1902) was a 19th-century American philanthropist, suffragist, and writer. Her generous financial support had been indispensable to the New Jersey state association.

== Early life ==
Cornelia Collins was born on Broadway, in New York City, at a point where the St. Nicholas Hotel now stands, July 7, 1827. Her father, Stacy Budd Collins, was born in Trenton, New Jersey, his father, Isaac Collins, having published the New Jersey Gazette. She was a descendant of Stephen Grillet and stated:—

"...that when Prince Albert died Queen Victoria had the life of Uncle Stephen Grillet read to her frequently and referred to his visits to the Emperor of Russia, and it was a power of consolation in her sorrow. The reader was her daughter, the Princess Alice, mother of the present Czar’s wife. She interested the Czar in peace."

She was a member of the Society of Friends, to which sect her family have belonged for several generations. In early years, she was in sympathy with the anti-slavery movement, and before reaching her majority, became a manager of the Colored Orphan Asylum in her native city.

== Career ==
On April 16, 1851, in New York, she married William H. Hussey, of New Bedford, Massachusetts. They have had three children, Dr. Mary H. Hussey (b. 1853), the devotee of woman suffrage, Frederick Hussey (b. 1856), and George Benjamin Hussey (b. 1863), a professor in the Western Maryland College.

In 1853, she became acquainted with Dr. Elizabeth Blackwell, who had just settled in medical practice in New York. Dr. Blackwell became Hussey's medical adviser. In that year, and for the first time in the world's history, poor women could consult a regularly graduated physician of their own sex at the dispensary that Blackwell established. and some years afterwards, in cooperation with her and several other men and women, among whom was Cyrus West Field, she formed a body of trustees for the New York Infirmary for Women and Children (now, Lower Manhattan Hospital). The purpose of that society was to give poor women medical treatment at the hands of other women. Also, the Woman's Medical College was the outcome. From that hospital was developed in the course of time a medical college for women. Later, Hussey's only daughter studied her profession, first in the college and then in the infirmary. In that hospital, she endowed a child's bed in the memory of her father.

The family moved to Orange, New Jersey. As her children grew up, Hussey took an active interest in the woman suffrage movement, and became a member of the executive committee of the American Woman Suffrage Association. Subsequently, on the request of Susan B. Anthony, she was made vice-president for New Jersey of the National Woman Suffrage Association. She retained those positions during a number of years. In 1876, efforts were made in several large cities to permit the licensing of the social evil, and Hussey, always interested in efforts for social purity, was chosen secretary of the committee formed to oppose such legislation.

When that work had been brought to a successful termination, Hussey became interested in the claim of Anna Ella Carroll for a government pension, on account of services rendered during the civil war. Hussey raised US$4,500 for Carroll who planned the Tennessee Campaign, that is said to have brought the war to a close. She afterwards aided in the support of Carroll. Through her efforts, considerable sums of money were raised by private subscription, and articles were published in some of the leading magazines on the work of Carroll. For at least two decades, Hussey contributed numerous articles to the Woman's Journal and various other reform periodicals, as well as to the papers of her State.

She was one of the fourteen original members of the Woman's Club of Orange, and a trustee of the New York Infirmary for Women and Children. She was a life member of the New Jersey Legal Aid Association and contributed the money to start it. She was one of the managers of the Colored Orphan Asylum in New York with President Roosevelt's mother, when it was unpopular to befriend African Americans. She was one of the founders of the American Purity Alliance and served as secretary and vice-president. She entertained Lucy Stone, Susan B. Anthony, Anna Howard Shaw, Carrie Chapman Catt, Amanda Deyo, and others. She contributed to the East Orange Flower Mission. Hussey was an honorary member of the National Woman Suffrage Association, a cause she had been devoted to for 33 years. She left them US$10,000. She represented the organization in New Jersey as vice president. She contributed liberally to most of the charities in Orange.

In her private park, she entertained the “Little Mothers” from New York, the Whittier House kindergarten and other poor children. She entertained meetings of women physicians and lawyers, as well as woman suffrage meetings, and a meeting of the Society of New England Women, and Peace meetings to aid the Universal Peace Union. Hussey was a member of the Orange Political Study Club. She was a pronounced anti-slavery woman when William Lloyd Garrison was mobbed. She was attending a meeting when she was in terror for fear they would kill him.

She early took a life membership to the Universal Peace Union for peace. They had built for her a cottage in the Peace Grove at Mystic, Connecticut, which was named for herself and husband, “The William and Cornelia.” She then gave them US$2,500.

== Death and legacy ==
She had a very slight stroke of paralysis two years before her death, and again a few weeks before her death. On the evening of October 12, 1902, she was stricken with paralysis, and died on Monday morning, October 13, 1902. She was buried at Milton-on-the Hudson.

At the Thirty-sixth Annual Convention of the National American Suffrage Association, Catt spoke of Hussey and her generosity, saying:—

"Often and often she sent a hundred dollars to our treasury with a note: 'I have just sold a piece of real estate and I want to give a part of the proceeds to the suffrage cause.'" Miss Blackwell added to the tribute: "A quiet woman of Quaker blood, never seeking office or prominence, she came to the relief of our distressed officers on innumerable occasions. She once told me that there were many who could write and speak for equal suffrage but that the Lord seemed to have given her only one talent, that of making money, and she meant to use it for the cause. She was a great believer in preaching the gospel of reform through the printed page and she and her daughter, Dr. Mary D. Hussey, who was like-minded with her, have sent out probably more equal suffrage literature than any other two women in the United States. She placed the Woman's Journal in a great number of college reading-rooms and sent it far and wide. During the thirty-three years that the paper has been published—and published always at a financial loss—she has been one of its most steadfast and generous friends."

Hussey left a bequest of US$10,000 to the National American Woman Suffrage Association.
