= Pauline Waddington Holme =

American suffragist (1848–1940)

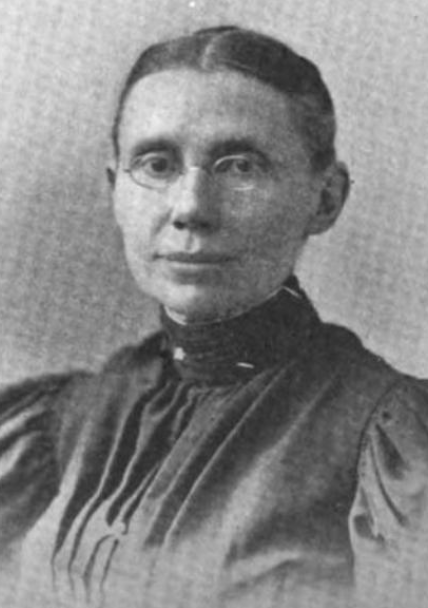
- Pauline Waddington Holmes, from an 1895 publication
- Born: November 12, 1848; Elsinboro Township, New Jersey
- Died: June 14, 1940 (aged 91); Baltimore, Maryland
- Occupation: Suffragist
- Children: 3, including Hilda P. Holme

Pauline Waddington Holme (November 12, 1848 – June 14, 1940) was an American temperance worker and suffragist. She was president of the Woman's Temperance Union of Baltimore, and vice-president of the Maryland Woman Suffrage Association.

== Early life ==
Pauline Waddington was born in Elsinboro, New Jersey, the daughter of Joshua Waddington and Ann P. Vanneman Waddington. Her family were Quakers. She attended Vassar College, and graduated in 1869, in Vassar's first graduating class.

== Career ==
Holme was president of the Woman's Temperance Union of Baltimore. She served on the executive council of the American Purity Alliance. In 1895, she spoke on "the purification of the press" at the National Purity Congress; her committee's efforts involved writing letters to editors, with "an appeal for the exclusion of detailed and sensational reports of the evil doings of the day, and all immoral or questionable advertisements from our newspapers" . In 1900, Holme was elected vice-president of the Maryland Woman Suffrage Association. She was a delegate to the National Congress of Mothers in 1897. She was active in the Baltimore Yearly Meeting of the Society of Friends, and served on the congregation's committees, including those on philanthropic labor, schools, and Indian affairs.

A poem by Holme, "Speaking Evil", appeared in an 1893 collection of works by women writers, published in connection with the World's Columbian Exposition.

== Personal life ==
Waddington married dairyman Richard Henry Holme in 1883; they had three children together, including Quaker relief worker and book collector Hilda P. Holme. Her husband died in 1921, and two of her children died in an automobile accident in 1924. She died in 1940, aged 91 years, in Baltimore. She was the last surviving member of Vassar's first graduating class.
