= James McCune Smith =

American physician (1813–1870)

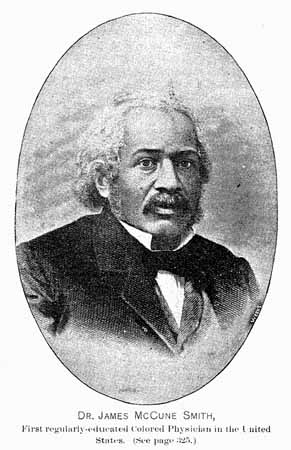
- Born: April 18, 1813; Manhattan, New York, U.S.
- Died: November 17, 1865 (aged 52); Long Island, New York, U.S.
- Education: African Free School; Glasgow University (M.D.)
- Spouse: Malvina Barnett
- Scientific career
- Fields: Internal medicine
- Workplaces: Colored Orphan Asylum; Wilberforce University

James McCune Smith (April 18, 1813 – November 17, 1865) was an American medical doctor, apothecary, abolitionist and author. He was the first African American to earn a medical degree. His M.D. was awarded by the University of Glasgow in Glasgow, Scotland, where a building has been dedicated to him. After his return to the United States, he also became the first African American to run a pharmacy in the nation.

In addition to practicing as a physician for nearly 20 years at the Colored Orphan Asylum in Manhattan, Smith was a public intellectual: he contributed articles to medical journals, participated in learned societies, and wrote numerous essays and articles drawing from his medical and statistical training. He used his training in medicine and statistics to refute common misconceptions about race, intelligence, medicine, and society in general. He was invited as a founding member of the New York Statistics Society in 1852, which promoted a then new science. Later he was elected as a member in 1854 of the recently founded American Geographic Society. He was never admitted to the American Medical Association or local medical associations, very likely as a result of the systemic racism that Smith confronted throughout his medical career. In 2018, Smith received a posthumous fellowship from the New York Academy of Medicine.

He has been most well known for his leadership as an abolitionist: a member of the American Anti-Slavery Society, with Frederick Douglass he helped start the National Council of Colored People in 1853, the first permanent national organization for blacks. Douglass called Smith "the single most important influence on his life." Smith was one of the Committee of Thirteen, who organized in 1850 in Manhattan to resist the newly passed Fugitive Slave Law by aiding refugee slaves through the Underground Railroad. Other leading abolitionist activists were among his friends and colleagues. From the 1840s, Smith lectured on race and abolitionism and wrote numerous articles to refute racist ideas about black capacities.

Both Smith and his wife were of mixed African and European descent. As he became economically successful, Smith built a house in a mostly white neighborhood; in the 1860 census he and his family were classified as white, along with their neighbors. (In the census of 1850, while living in a predominately African-American neighborhood, they had been classified as mulatto.) Smith served for nearly 20 years as the physician at the Colored Orphan Asylum in New York. After it was burned down in July 1863 by a mob in draft riots in Manhattan, in which nearly 100 blacks were killed, Smith moved his family and practice to Brooklyn for their safety. Many other blacks left Manhattan for Brooklyn at the same time. The parents stressed education for their children. In the 1870 census, his widow and children continued to be classified as white.

== Early life and education ==
Smith was born into slavery in 1813 in Manhattan and was set free on July 4, 1827, at the age of 14, by the Emancipation Act of New York. That was the date when New York officially freed its remaining slaves. His mother Lavinia was born enslaved. He later described her as a "self-emancipated woman". She was born into slavery in South Carolina and had been transported to New York as an enslaved woman.

He grew up only with his mother. As an adult, McCune Smith alluded to white ancestry through his mother's family, saying he had kin in the South, some of whom were slaveholders and others slaves.

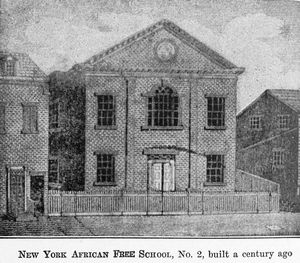
Lithograph of the African Free School that Smith attended

Smith attended the African Free School (AFS) #2 on Mulberry Street in Manhattan, where he was described as an "exceptionally bright student". He was selected to deliver an oratory to the Marquis de Lafayette, the French war hero who visited the school on September 10, 1824, during his tour of the country. Smith was among numerous boys from the school who went on to have brilliant careers, some of whom he worked with as adults in the abolitionist cause.

In the course of his studies, Smith was tutored by Rev. Peter Williams Jr., a graduate of the African Free School who had been ordained in 1826 as the second African-American priest in the Episcopal Church. Upon graduation, he applied to Columbia University and Geneva Medical College in New York State, but was denied admission due to racial discrimination. Williams encouraged Smith to attend the University of Glasgow in Scotland. He and abolitionist benefactors of the AFS provided Smith with money for his trip overseas and his education. Smith kept a journal of his sea voyage that expressed his sense of mission. After arriving in Liverpool and walking along the waterfront, he thought: "I am free!"

Through abolitionist connections, he was welcomed there by members of the London Agency Anti-Slavery Society. According to the historian Thomas M. Morgan, Smith enjoyed the relative racial tolerance in Scotland and England, which judicially abolished slavery in the 1770s. (New York abolished all slavery in 1827.) He studied at the University of Glasgow and obtained a bachelor's degree in 1835, a master's degree in 1836, and a medical degree in 1837. He completed an internship in Paris.

Smith knew he would face discrimination upon his return. When he tried to book a trip back to the United States after completing his studies, the ship captain refused passage because of Smith's race. His passage was secured by an intervention from John Murray, a prominent Glasgow abolitionist who wrote to the captain directly. When Smith did return to Manhattan, he was met with a hero's welcome by his former classmates and teachers who applauded his determination to fight for civil rights on American soil.

== Marriage and family ==
After establishing himself upon his return to New York City, in the early 1840s Smith married Malvina Barnett, a free woman of color who had graduated from the Rutgers Female Institute. The couple had eleven children; five survived to adulthood (the name of one child is unknown):

- Frederick Douglass Smith (d. 1854)
- Peter Williams Smith (d. 1854)
- Mary S. Smith
- James Ward Smith (born 1845) became a teacher; he married and had an independent household by 1870
- Henry M. Smith (1847 – d. before 1859)
- Amy G. Smith (c. 1848–1849 – d. December 1849)
- Mary (also called Maude) Smith, born c. 1855––56; never married; became a teacher and was living with her widowed brother Donald in 1900 in Queens. (Note: In the 1900 census, her birth was reported as September 1842, but this is not consistent with her age in the 1860 and 1870 censuses, and she did not appear in the 1850 census.)
- Donald Smith (born 1858) became a lawyer, married and was a widower by 1900, living in Queens. His household included his older sister Maude and two siblings of his late wife: his widowed brother-in-law Edward, a physician born in England, and sister-in-law Emma Callaghan, an unmarried teacher.
- John Murray Smith, (born February 1860), named after his father's Scottish friend, John Murray worked in Florida in an orange grove in the 1880s, per the Florida 1885 census. He married in 1888, and their three children were born in Florida. By 1900, he returned to Brooklyn with his family, and worked there as a printer. In 2019, a descendent rediscovered his maternal ancestry through various genealogical records. His son was Jay Murray Smith, who married a Rose (or Rosa) Larm from New York.
- Guy Beaumont Smith, born 1862, first worked as a seaman. By 1900, he was married with several children and worked as a salesman. His youngest daughter was named Antoinette.

In 1850, the senior Smiths' household included four older women: Lavinia Smith, age 67 (his mother: b. c.1783 – d. bet.1860-1870), born in South Carolina and listed first as head of household; Sarah Williams, 57 (widow of Peter Williams Jr.); Amelia Jones, 47; and Mary Hewlitt, 53, who were likely relatives or friends. By then Smith and his wife Malvina had three children: James, Henry, and Amy. Each member of the household was classified as mulatto (or of mixed ancestry). All but Lavinia Smith were born in New York. They lived in a mixed neighborhood in the Fifth Ward; in the census, nearly all other neighbors on the page were classified as white; many were immigrants from England, Ireland, and France.

By 1860, Smith was doing very well; he had moved to Leonard Street within the Fifth Ward and had a mansion built by white workmen. His total real property was worth $25,000. His household included a live-in servant, Catherine Grelis from Ireland. Listed as a separate household at his address were Sara D. Williams, 57, and Mary Hertell (should be Hewlitt, as above), 50. (These were likely the same Sara and Mary as in the 1850 census, although their ages did not change.) No one on this census page had a racial designation. By the conventions of the time, this means that they were classified as white by the census enumerator; totals of white persons only are given at the bottom of the page.

After the draft riots in Manhattan in 1863, Smith and his family were among prominent African Americans who left Manhattan and moved to Brooklyn, then still separate cities. He no longer felt safe in their old neighborhood.

In the 1870 census, Malvina (now a widow) and their four children were living in Ward 15, Brooklyn. All were classified as white. Their son James W. Smith, who had married a white woman, was living in a separate household and working as a teacher; he was also classified as white. The Smith children still at home were Maud, 15; Donald, 12; John, 10; and Guy, 8; all were attending school. These five Smith children survived to adulthood: James, Maud, Donald, John and Guy. The men married white spouses, but Maud never married. All were classified as white from 1860 onward.

They worked as teachers, a lawyer, and business people. Smith's unique achievements as a pioneering African-American physician were rediscovered by twentieth-century historians. They were relearned by his descendants in the twenty-first century, who identified as white and did not know about him with the passage of generations. A three-times-great-granddaughter took a history class and found his name in her grandmother's family Bible. In 2010, several Smith descendants commissioned a new tombstone for his grave in Brooklyn. They gathered to honor him and their African-American ancestry.

== Career ==
=== Medicine ===
McCune Smith received his medical doctorate from Glasgow University in 1837. The university's medical school was one of the leading programmes in Europe. After his graduation, he was awarded a prestigious gynacological residency at Glasgow's Lock hospital for women. Based on his experience in the hospital, he published two articles in the London Medical Gazette. They are the first scientific articles known to have been published by an African American in a scientific journal. The articles exposed the unethical use of an experimental drug upon non-consenting female patients.

When Smith returned to Manhattan in 1837 with his degrees, he was greeted as a hero by the black community. He said at a gathering, "I have striven to obtain education, at every sacrifice and every hazard, and to apply such education to the good of our common country." He was the first university-trained African-American physician in the United States. During his practice of 25 years, he was also the first Black to have articles published in American medical journals, but he was never admitted to the American Medical Association or to local ones.

He established his practice in Lower Manhattan in general surgery and medicine, treating both black and white patients. He started a school in the evenings, teaching children. He established what has been called the first black-owned and operated pharmacy in the United States, located at 93 West Broadway (near present-day Foley Square). His friends and activists gathered in the back room of the pharmacy to discuss issues related to their work in abolitionism.

In 1846, Smith was appointed as the only physician of the Colored Orphan Asylum (also known as the Free Negro Orphan Asylum), at Forty-fourth Street and Fifth Avenue. (Before that time, the directors had depended on pro bono services of physicians.) He worked there for nearly 20 years. The asylum was founded in 1836 by Anna and Hannah Shotwell and Mary Murray, Quaker philanthropists in New York. Trying to protect the children, Smith regularly gave vaccinations for smallpox. Leading causes of death were infectious diseases: measles (for which there was no vaccine), smallpox, and tuberculosis (for which there was no antibiotic at the time). In addition to caring for orphans, the home sometimes boarded children temporarily when their parents were unable to support them, as jobs were scarce for free blacks in New York. Waves of immigration from Ireland and Germany in the 1840s and 1850s meant that many new immigrants were competing for work.

Smith was always working for the asylum. In July 1852, he presented the trustees with 5,000 acres of land provided by his friend Gerrit Smith, a wealthy white abolitionist. The land was to be held in trust and later sold for benefit of the orphans.

=== Abolitionist movement ===
While in Scotland, Smith joined the Glasgow Emancipation Society and met people in the Scottish and English abolitionist movement. In 1833, Great Britain abolished slavery in the British Empire (slavery in England had been abolished in 1107, but this was not finally confirmed in law until the Somerset v Stewart case in 1772. Scotland has a separate legal system and a similar case to Somerset confirmed the invalidity of slavery under Scottish law in 1778.) When Smith returned to New York, he quickly joined the American Anti-Slavery Society and worked for the cause in the United States. He worked effectively with both Black and white abolitionists, for instance maintaining a friendship and correspondence with Gerrit Smith that spanned the years from 1846 to 1865.

Publishing lectures quickly brought him to the attention of the national abolitionist movement. His "Destiny of the People of Color", "Freedom and Slavery for Africans", and "A lecture on the Haitian Revolution; with a note on Toussaint L'Ouverture", established him as a new force in the field. He directed the Colored People's Educational Movement (to the memory of Abraham Lincoln). In 1850, as a member of the Committee of Thirteen, Smith was one of the key organizers of resistance in Manhattan to the newly passed Fugitive Slave Act that required states to aid federal law enforcement in capturing escaped slaves. As did similar groups in Boston, his committee aided fugitive slaves to escape capture and helped connect them to people of the Underground Railroad and other escape routes.

During the mid-1850s, Smith worked with Frederick Douglass to establish the National Council of Colored People, one of the first permanent Black national organizations, beginning with a three-day convention in Rochester, New York. At the convention in Rochester, he and Douglass emphasized the importance of education for their race and urged the founding of more schools for Black youth. Smith wanted choices available for both industrial and classical education. Douglass valued his rational approach and said that Smith was "the single most important influence on his life". Smith tempered the more radical people in the abolitionist movement and insisted on arguing from facts and analysis. He wrote a regular column in Douglass's paper, published under the pseudonym "Communipaw".

Opposing the emigration of American free blacks to other countries, Smith believed that native-born Americans had the right to live in the United States and a claim by their labor and birth to their land. He gathered supporters to go to Albany to testify to the state legislature against proposed plans to support the American Colonization Society that had supported sending free Blacks to the colony of Liberia in Africa. He contributed money to revive the Weekly Anglo-African in 1861, as an anti-emigrationist newspaper.

In the mid-1850s, Smith joined James W.C. Pennington and other black leaders in establishing the Legal Rights Association (LRA) in Manhattan. A pioneering minority-rights association, the LRA waged a nearly ten-year campaign against segregated public transportation in the city. This organization successfully defeated segregation in New York and served as a model for later rights organizations, including the National Equal Rights League and the National Association for the Advancement of Colored People (NAACP), founded in the early twentieth century.

=== Draft Riots ===
In July 1863, during the draft riots in Manhattan, Irish rioters attacked Blacks throughout the city and burned down the orphan asylum. The children were saved by the staff, police, firemen and Union troops in the city. During its nearly 30 years, the orphan asylum had admitted 1310 children, and typically, had approximately 200 in residence at a time.

After the riots, Smith moved his family and business out of Manhattan to Brooklyn, as did other prominent Blacks. Numerous buildings had been destroyed in their old neighborhoods, and estimates were that some 100 Blacks were killed in the rioting. No longer feeling safe in the lower Fourth Ward, the Smiths moved to Williamsburg, Brooklyn.

=== Professional associations and writings ===
Smith was a prolific writer and essayist. The historian John Stauffer of Harvard University says: "He was one of the leaders within the movement to abolish slavery, and he was one of the most original and innovative writers of his time."

In 1839, he followed Samuel Cornish as editor of The Colored American, a New York weekly newspaper owned by Philip Alexander Bell. Among his notable writings was a debate with John Hughes, the Roman Catholic Archbishop of New York, who was known as a racist and anti-abolitionist.

In 1840, Smith wrote the earliest known case report by a Black physician, entitled "Case of Ptyalism with fatal termination" that his associate Dr. John Watson read at a meeting of the New York Medical and Surgical Society. In 1844, Smith published an article entitled "On the Influence of Opium upon the Catamenial Functions" in the New York Journal of Medicine, the earliest known contribution to the medical literature by a Black physician.

He drew from his medical training to discredit popular misconceptions about differences among the races. In 1843, he gave a lecture series entitled Comparative Anatomy and Physiology of the Races to demonstrate the failings of phrenology, which was a so-called "scientific" practice of the time that was applied in a way to draw racist conclusions and attribute negative characteristics to ethnic Africans. He rejected the practice of homeopathy, an alternative to the scientific medicine being taught in universities. Although he had a successful medical career, Smith was never admitted to the American Medical Association or local associations because of racial discrimination.

In Glasgow, he was trained in the emerging science of statistics. He published numerous articles applying his statistical training. For example, he used statistics to refute the arguments of slave owners, who wrote that Blacks were inferior and that slaves were better off than were free Blacks or white urban laborers. To do this, he drew up statistical tables of data derived from the census.

When John C. Calhoun, then U.S. Secretary of State claimed that freedom negatively affected Black Americans and that the 1840 U.S. Census showed that Blacks in the North had high rates of insanity and mortality, Smith responded with a masterful paper. In "A Dissertation on the Influence of Climate on Longevity" (1846), published in Hunt's Merchants' Magazine, Smith analyzed the census both to refute Calhoun's conclusions and to show the correct way to analyze data. He showed that Blacks in the North lived longer than slaves, attended church more, and were achieving scholastically at a rate similar to whites. Based on Smith's findings, John Quincy Adams, acting in his capacity in the House of Representatives, called for an investigation of the census results. However, Calhoun responded by appointing a pro-slavery crony who determined that the census was flawless, and the 1840 census was never corrected.

In 1847, the founding year of the New York Academy of Medicine (NYAM), Smith was nominated for resident fellowship by two founding members of the academy. Because of his race, Smith's nomination posed a challenge for the fledgling, but rapidly growing academy and its committee on admissions, who wished to avoid "agitation of the question". After discussions, correspondence, and procedural postponements throughout 1847, the committee on admissions eventually neither accepted nor rejected Smith, but instead implemented a rule to permit Smith to be regarded as "not nominated", a unique designation that effectively rejected his fellowship.

As Smith started publishing, his work was quickly accepted by newer scientific organizations: in 1852 Smith was invited to be a founding member of the New York Statistics Institute. In 1854 he was elected as a member by the American Geographical Society (founded in New York in 1851 by top scientists as well as wealthy amateurs interested in exploration). The Society recognized him by giving him an award for one of his articles. He joined the New-York Historical Society.

Among numerous other works supporting abolitionism and dealing with issues related to race, Smith was known for his introduction to Frederick Douglass's second autobiography, My Bondage and My Freedom (1855). It expressed the new independence in African-American accounts of slavery, compared to earlier works that had to seek approval for authentication from white abolitionists, as readers rejected some harsh accounts of conditions under slavery.

Smith wrote: "The worst of our institutions, in its worst aspect, cannot keep down energy, truthfulness, and earnest struggle for the right".

In addition, during the 1850s Smith gained prominence with African-American readers and abolitionist readers of all ethnicities for his regularly published (often weekly) columns in Frederick Douglass Paper. Smith's commentaries on African-American culture, local and national politics, literature, and styles of dress made him one of the earliest Black public intellectuals to gain popularity in the U.S.

In 1859, Smith published an article using scientific findings and analysis to refute the former president Thomas Jefferson's theories of race, as expressed in his well-known Notes on the State of Virginia (1785). Dr. Vanessa Northington Gamble, a medical physician and historian at George Washington University, in 2010 noted: "As early as 1859, Dr. McCune Smith said that race was not biological but was a social category." He commented on the positive ways that ethnic Africans would influence U.S. culture and society, in music, dance, food, and other elements. His collected essays, speeches, and letters have been published as The Works of James McCune Smith: Black Intellectual and Abolitionist (2006), edited by John Stauffer.

=== Later years and death ===
In 1863, Smith was appointed as professor of anthropology at Wilberforce University, the first African American-owned and operated college in the United States. Smith was too ill to take the position. He died two years later, on November 17, 1865, at the age of 52, from congestive heart failure. This was nineteen days before ratification of the Thirteenth Amendment to the United States Constitution that abolished slavery. He was buried at Cypress Hills Cemetery in Brooklyn. Smith was survived by his widow, Malvina, and five children.

To escape racial discrimination and have more opportunities, his children passed into white society: the four surviving sons married white spouses; his unmarried daughter lived with a brother. They worked as teachers, a lawyer, and as business people. Smith's unique achievements as a pioneering African-American physician were rediscovered by twentieth-century historians. They were relearned by his descendants in the twenty-first century, who identified as white and did not know about him, when a great-great-great-granddaughter took a history class and found his name in her grandmother's family bible. In 2010, several Smith descendants commissioned a new tombstone for his grave in Brooklyn and gathered to honor him and their African-American ancestry.

=== Honors and legacy ===
In November 2018, the New York Academy of Medicine (NYAM) posthumously inducted Smith as a fellow of the academy, 171 years after his nomination and 153 years after his death. At the 2018 Discourse and Awards ceremony, NYAM President Judith Salerno presented a replica certificate of fellowship to Professor Joanne Edey-Rhodes, who accepted on behalf of Smith's descendants. In 2019, the academy also formally unveiled a portrait of Smith, commissioned by Academy Fellow Dr. Daniel Laroche and painted by artist Junior Jacques. It now is on display at the academy.

The University of Glasgow, Smith's alma mater, has named its new Learning Hub building the James McCune Smith Learning Hub and it opened to students early in 2021. The university has also established a scholarship and an annual lecture named after Smith.

== Smith's life featured on Scottish Television "People's History" show ==
In its second series of the Scottish Television series "People's History", there was a "special episode" entitled "Slave Trade and Abolition". This was presented by Sir Geoff Palmer and focused primarily on Smith. It included an interview with Smith's great grand-daughter Antoinette Martignoni, in which she explained how the family discovered their famous ancestor

Some of the episode featured Glasgow University Archives where Professor Simon Newman displaying handwritten and printed information relating to Smith, including the official university record from session 1833-34 showing that Smith was placed third in the Logic Class (First Division). Also during his interview for the show, Professor Newman called Smith a "brilliant student".

== Works ==
- Smith, James McCune (1841). A Lecture on the Haytien Revolutions; with a sketch of the character of Toussaint L'Ouverture. Delivered at the Stuyvesant Institute... February 26, 1841. New York: Managers of the Colored Orphan Asylum. OCLC 16788188.
- Smith, James McCune (1843). The Destiny of the People of Color, a lecture, delivered before the Philomathean Society and Hamilton Lyceum, in January, 1841. New York. OCLC 27872624. Archived from the original on October 28, 2022.
- Smith, James McCune (1846). "A Dissertation on the Influence of Climate on Longevity". The merchants' magazine and commercial review. OCLC 34227767.
- Smith, James McCune (1855). My bondage and my freedom... By Frederick Douglass. With an introduction [of 15 pages] By James M'Cune Smith. New York and Auburn: Miller, Orton & Mulligan.
- Smith, James McCune (1860). Ira Aldridge. New York: Arno Press; The New York Times. OCLC 35129946.
- Smith, James McCune (1865). A memorial discourse; by Henry Highland Garnet, delivered in the hall of the House of Representatives, Washington City, D.C. on Sabbath, February 12, 1865. With an introduction [of 52 pages], by James McCune Smith, M.D. Philadelphia: Joseph M. Wilson.
- Smith, James McCune (2006). Stauffer, John (ed.). The Works of James McCune Smith: Black Intellectual and Abolitionist. New York: Oxford University Press. ISBN 978-0-19-530961-4.
