= Hilda P. Holme =

American relief worker

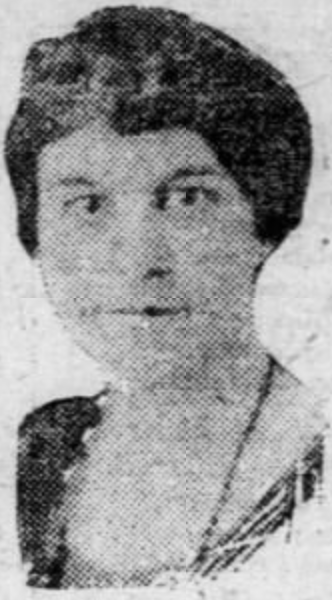
- Hilda P. Holme, from a 1922 newspaper
- Born: October 1, 1888; Salem, New Jersey, U.S.
- Died: March 6, 1960 (aged 71); Lutherville, Maryland, U.S.
- Occupations: Relief worker, book collector
- Parent(s): Pauline Waddington Holme and Richard Henry Holme

Hilda Pauline Holme (October 1, 1888 – March 6, 1960) was an American Quaker relief worker in Europe after World War I, and a book collector.

== Early life ==
Hilda P. Holme was born in Salem, New Jersey, the daughter of Richard Henry Holme and Pauline Waddington Holme. Her parents were Quakers; her father was a dairyman, and her mother was a noted temperance activist and suffragist. As a teenager, Holme served on a schools committee at the Baltimore Yearly Meeting of Friends, along with her mother and older sister. In 1910, following her mother and older sister, she graduated from Vassar College, with further studies at Johns Hopkins University.

== Career ==
Holme worked in France and Poland doing refugee relief and agricultural reconstruction work with the American Friends Service Committee during and after World War I. She spoke to American women's clubs when she was home in Baltimore about her work, sometimes sharing examples of typical Polish peasant clothing. Some of the photographs she took while doing this work are in the Friends Historical Library at Swarthmore College.

Holme collected hundreds of books, prints and illustrations in her travels, including books illustrated by Gustave Doré, John Everett Millais, and Dante Gabriel Rossetti. She also organized a donation of over 900 children's books to the Warsaw Public Library in 1946. She donated her collection of books to the Enoch Pratt Free Library in 1954.

== Personal life ==
Holme's older siblings both died in an automobile accident in 1924. She died in 1960, aged 71 years, at a nursing home in Lutherville, Maryland. Her collection of European folk costumes was donated to the International Center at the West Baltimore branch of the YWCA, and displayed there in 1965 and 1975. Her book collections became the Hilda Holme Book Illustration Collection at the Enoch Pratt Free Library, and more than 100 of the illustrations are available through Digital Maryland.
