= Elizabeth Powell Bond =

Educator and social activist

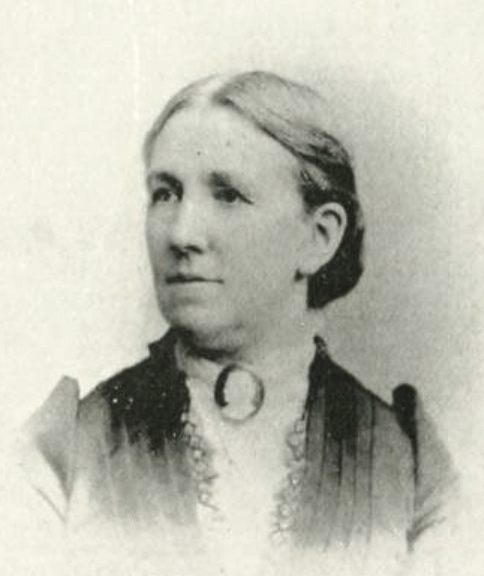
- Born: January 25, 1841; Clinton, Dutchess County, New York, United States
- Died: March 29, 1926 (aged 85); Jeanes Home in Germantown, Philadelphia, Pennsylvania, United States
- Education: State Normal School
- Occupations: first Dean of Women at Swarthmore College, author
- Spouse: Henry Herrick Bond
- Children: 2
- Parents: Townsend Powell; Catherine Macy Powell

Elizabeth Powell Bond (January 25, 1841 – March 29, 1926) was an educator and social activist who was the first Dean of Women at Swarthmore College.

== Family and education ==
Elizabeth Powell was born in 1841 in Clinton, New York, to a Quaker couple, Catherine Macy Powell and Townsend Powell. Her father was a farmer, and when she was four, the family moved to a farm in Ghent. By the age of 15, she was serving as an assistant teacher at a Friends’ School in the county. She graduated at the age of seventeen from the State Normal School in Albany. Her brother married educator and activist Anna Rice Powell in 1861.

Like many Quakers, she held strong views against slavery and was a suffragist, peace activist, and temperance reformer. At the age of 16, she was speaking out at local meetings of anti-slavery campaigners. She spent some time in the household of the abolitionist William Lloyd Garrison before her marriage.

In 1872, she married Henry Herrick Bond, a lawyer from Northampton, Massachusetts. They had two sons, Edwin (born 1874), and Herrick, (born 1878, died in infancy). Henry Herrick Bond died in 1881.

== Career in education ==
Bond began her career by teaching for two years in New York public schools. In the early 1860s, she ran a boarding school for three years out of her parents’ house, with the student body including both African-American and Catholic children.

In 1865, after training with the physical culture advocate Diocletian Lewis, Bond became the first instructor in gymnastics at Vassar College. In the early 1870s, she briefly headed up the Free Congregational Sunday school in Florence, Massachusetts, returning in 1885 to become the resident minister for a year. She also worked for a time as editor (with her husband) of the Northampton Journal.

In 1886, Swarthmore College appointed Elizabeth Powell Bond to the post of Matron of the College. In 1890, she was named Dean, a position she kept until her retirement in 1906, when she was named Dean Emeritus. She was succeeded by Henrietta Meeteer as Dean. She played an important role in the development of coeducation at the college.

Bond died in Germantown, Pennsylvania, in 1926.

== Legacy ==
An avid gardener, Bond was honored by Swarthmore with a rose garden created in her honor. A room at the college also bears her name.

Her papers, including correspondence, diaries, business papers, pictures, and memorabilia, are held by Swarthmore College. Her correspondents included Louisa May Alcott, Hannah Clothier Hull, William Lloyd Garrison, and many others.
